= Myth II: Soulblighter =

1998 video game

- Developer: Bungie
- Publishers: NA: Bungie; EU: GT Interactive; WW: Loki Software (Linux)
- Producer: Tuncer Deniz
- Programmer: Jason Regier
- Artist: Mark Bernal
- Writers: Robert McLees; Tuncer Deniz; Bob Settles; Jason Jones
- Composers: Martin O'Donnell; Michael Salvatori; Paul Heitsch
- Series: Myth
- Platforms: Windows; Mac OS; Linux
- Release: NA: December 28, 1998; EU: February 12, 1999
- Genre: Real-time tactics
- Modes: Single-player, multiplayer

Myth II: Soulblighter is a 1998 real-time tactics video game developed by Bungie for Windows and Mac OS. Published by Bungie in North America and by GT Interactive in Europe, the game was also ported to Linux by Loki Entertainment. It is the second game in the Myth series, and a sequel to Myth: The Fallen Lords. In 1999, an expansion pack, Myth II: Chimera, was released. Developed by the Badlands mapmaking group, in association with Bungie, Chimera is set ten years after Soulblighter. Originally released as a free download, Chimera was later published by Bungie as part of the Total Codex bundle, incorporating it into the official Myth canon. In 2001, a third Myth game was released, Myth III: The Wolf Age, set one thousand years prior to The Fallen Lords, and developed by MumboJumbo.

Set sixty years after The Fallen Lords, the game tells the story of the resurgence of Soulblighter, a supporting antagonist in the first game, and one of the titular Fallen Lords. Determined to defeat the forces of Light who vanquished his master, Balor, and conquer the free cities of the world, Soulblighter resurrects the Myrkridia, a race of flesh eating monsters not seen in over a thousand years. Standing against Soulblighter is Alric, the main protagonist in the first game, and now King of The Province, who must rally humanity to fight a war they never expected. Chimera is set ten years after Soulblighter, and tells the story of three veterans of the campaign against Soulblighter, who band together to fight a mysterious sorceress.

Soulblighter was a critical success, with reviewers feeling it improved on virtually every aspect of The Fallen Lords. They cited better, more detailed graphics, enhanced sound effects, more varied gameplay, better AI, more intricate and varied level design, and a more user-friendly interface and control scheme. Critics were also impressed with the improvements made to online multiplayer mode, and praised the variety of options available to players. Critics also lauded the mapmaking tools included with the game, which allowed users to create their own maps for both multiplayer gaming and single-player campaigns. The game also sold very well, considerably outselling the original, which had been Bungie's best selling game up to that point.

The Myth series as a whole, and Soulblighter in particular, supported an active online community for over a decade after the official servers went offline. The first formally organized group of volunteer-programmers was MythDevelopers, who were given access to the game's source code by Bungie. The most recently active Myth development group is Project Magma, an offshoot of MythDevelopers. These groups have worked to provide ongoing technical support for the games, update them to newer operating systems, fix bugs, release unofficial patches, create mods, and maintain online servers for multiplayer gaming.

== Gameplay ==
Myth II: Soulblighter is a real-time tactics game; unlike real-time strategy games, the player does not have to engage in resource micromanagement or economic macromanagement, does not have to construct a base or buildings, and does not have to gradually build up their army by acquiring resources and researching new technologies. Instead, each level begins with the player's army already assembled and ready for combat. During the game, the player controls forces of various sizes made up of a number of different units, each possessing their own strengths and weaknesses. In single-player mode, only Light units are playable, but in online multiplayer mode, the player can control both Light and Dark units.

Screenshot of gameplay in Soulblighter, showing the selection of a single unit. The player has selected a bowman named Hadrian (the unit surrounded by a yellow rectangle). The image also shows unselected warriors, who are currently attacking enemy units. At the top of the screen is the Status Bar. The mini-map of the battlefield is just below on the right. At the bottom of the screen is the Control Bar.

Basic gameplay involves the player selecting and commanding units. To select an individual unit, the player clicks on that unit. Once selected, the unit is surrounded by a yellow rectangle, beside which is a health meter, which diminishes as the unit takes damage. Units capable of utilising magic also have a mana meter in addition to their health meter. As they use magic, this meter diminishes, and then slowly regenerates over time. Units do not regenerate health, however, and there is no way to construct new units (although in some single-player missions, reinforcements are automatically received at predetermined points). To select all nearby units of a given type, the player double-clicks on any individual unit of that type. To select multiple units of different types, the player can either "shift click" (hold down the shift key and click on each individual unit) or use "band-selection" (click and hold the mouse button on a piece of ground, then drag the cursor across the screen. This causes a yellow box to appear, which grows and shrinks as it follows the cursor's movement. When the player releases the button, any units within the box are selected). The player can instantly select all units on screen, irrespective of type, by pressing the enter key. The player can also assign manually selected unit groupings to a specific key on the keyboard, and when that key is pressed, it instantly selects the desired group of units.

Once one or more units have been selected, the player can click on the ground to make them walk to the selected spot, or click on an enemy to make them attack. Units with projectile weapons, such as archers and dwarves can also be ordered to attack a specific spot on the ground, rather than an enemy. It is also important that the player have their units facing in the right direction. This is accomplished by pressing the left or the right arrow key or moving the mouse to rotate the direction of the units as they move to the selected location. Facing the correct direction is especially important when using formations, of which there are nine available. After selecting a group of units, the player must press the corresponding formation button on the keyboard, and then click on the ground where they want the units to form. The player can also order all selected units to scatter and to retreat. All formations, as well as commands such as stopping, guarding, scattering, retreating, and reversing direction, are also available via a single click in the Control Bar at the bottom of the screen.

When a single unit is selected, information about that unit appears in the "Status Bar" at the top of the HUD; the unit's name, a brief biography, how many kills he has, how many battles he has survived, and (if he is capable of carrying items) his inventory. When multiple units are selected, the names, types, and quantity of units will appear, but there will be no biography or information on their kills or previous battles. The HUD also features a transparent overhead mini-map, which displays information about the current battlefield; the player's field of vision is indicated by a yellow trapezoid, enemy units appear as red dots, friendly non-playable units as blue dots, and the player's army as green dots. The player can click anywhere on the mini-map to instantly jump to that location. The mini-map does not initially display the entire battlefield; the player must explore the area for it to become fully mapped. The player can also order troops to move to any location on the mapped area of the battlefield by right-clicking on that area in the mini-map.

The player has full control over the camera throughout the game, and can move it backwards and forwards, left and right, orbit left and right (keeps the camera focused on a single spot while making a 360 degree circle around that spot), rotate left and right (the camera remains in the same spot but the player's point of view moves from side to side), and zoom in and out. All movements can be carried out via the keyboard and mouse. Using the mouse to move backwards, forwards, left and right is accomplished by moving the cursor to the top, bottom, left or right of the screen, respectively. The player can also select preferences to allow them to control rotation and orbiting via the mouse, by moving the cursor to the top and bottom corners of the screen, respectively. Zooming can be controlled by either the keyboard or mouse wheel.

Like in the original game, selecting and commanding units forms the basic gameplay of Soulblighter. The battles are more complex than simply commanding units to attack the enemy, with strategy and awareness of the conditions of the battlefield, and even the weather, also playing important roles. For example, due to the game's physics engine, objects react with one another, with units, and with the terrain. This can manifest itself simply in a severed head bouncing off one of the player's units and changing direction, but it can also have more serious consequences. For example, a dwarf could throw a molotov cocktail at an enemy on a hillside and miss, with the projectile rolling back down the hill towards the player's own units. Projectiles in general, both those used by the player and the enemy, have no guarantee of hitting anything; they are merely propelled in the direction instructed by the physics engine. Arrows, for example, may miss their intended target due to a small degree of simulated aiming error that becomes more significant at long range, or the target may move out of the way, or behind a tree or building. If archers are firing at enemies who are engaged in melee combat, they may also hit the player's own units instead of the enemy, causing the same amount of damage. This is also true of dwarfs' molotov cocktails. As such, friendly fire is an important aspect of the game. The weather is also something the player must always bear in mind. For example, rain or snow can put out explosive-based attacks. It is also much easier for projectile units to hit enemies below them rather than above them, and as such, positioning of the player's units is an important aspect of the game.

=== Single-player ===
In the single-player campaign, the player starts each mission with a group of soldiers, and must use that group to accomplish a specific goal or set of goals. These goals can involve killing a certain number of enemies, defending a location, reaching a certain point on the map, or destroying a specific object or enemy. The focus of the single-player campaign is on a smaller force defeating a much larger enemy force; in every mission, the Light units are outnumbered by enemies, often vastly, and so the player must use the terrain, employ the specific skills of their individual units, and gradually decrease the enemy force, or attempt to avoid it altogether. Units in the single-player campaign acquire experience with each kill. Experience increases attack rate, accuracy, and defence, and any unit that survives a battle will carry over to the next battle with their accumulated experience (assuming the next battle features units of that type).

=== Multiplayer ===
When it was released, Soulblighter could be used for multiplayer gaming on bungie.net, or via a LAN on PC or AppleTalk on Mac. In multiplayer, the player starts with an army, and can customize it by trading units with other players, using point values that approximate the value of the units being traded.

Multiplayer games include "Assassin" (each team has a "target unit", with the winner being the team who kills the opponents' target first), "Choke the Chicken" (identical to Assassin, except the target unit assigned to each team is a non-playable chicken), "Balls On Parade" (each team has a ball; the object is to capture as many of the opponents' balls as possible, with winner being the team in possession of the most balls at the end of the game), "Captures" (a number of balls are on the battlefield, with the winner being the player who is in possession of the most balls at the end of the match), "Flag Rally" (a number of flags are on the battlefield, with the winner being the first player to touch them all), "Hunting" (each team must kill as much wildlife as possible; each animal has a point value, and the winner is the team with the most points at the end of the game), "Last Man On The Hill" (a hill on the map is marked with a flag; whichever player owns the hill when time runs out is the winner), "Scavenger Hunt" (a number of balls are on the battlefield, with the winner being the first player to touch them all), "Stampede!" (each team starts with a herd of animals and a number of flags; the object is to shepherd the herd to the enemy flags, with each successfully herded animal earning the team one point. The winner is the team with the most points at the end of the game), "Steal The Bacon" (somewhere on the battlefield is a ball; the object is to get the ball and keep it away from the opponents, with the winner being the last team to touch the ball), "Territories" (a number of flags are on the battlefield, with the winner being the team to capture and hold the most flags), "Body Count" (team deathmatch), and "King Of The Hill" (a hill on the map is marked with a flag, with the hill captured when one or more of a team's units move within a certain range of the flag and eliminate any enemy units in the same area; the winner is the team who controls the hill for the longest amount of time).

== Plot ==
It is sixty years since the Great War, when Connacht, the hero who saved the world from the Myrkridia one thousand years previously, returned in the guise of Balor, and with his lieutenants, the Fallen Lords, attempted to destroy humanity. Alric, the only surviving Avatara, is now king of The Province, ruling from Madrigal. It is an age of peace and prosperity, with the Dark existing only in stories, although the fate of Soulblighter, Balor's chief lieutenant, remains unknown. The game opens with Alric experiencing a nightmare remembering the carnage of the War. He awakens to find a crow with red eyes at his window, watching him.

The game then cuts to a cluster of villages near Forest Heart. As with the first game, the story is told through the journal entries of a soldier in The Legion, which is now led by Crüniac, who the soldiers think is more interested in politics than military matters, and spends its time on what the men perceive as trivial errands. Their latest assignment has them investigate reports of grave robbing, however, they are shocked to find the village of Willow Creek besieged by undead Ghasts. They clear the village, and learn the grave robbing leads to the keep of Baron Kildaer. They head to the keep and see hundreds of Thrall moving towards Tallow. Crüniac sends a runner to warn the villagers, while The Legion attack the keep. Crüniac proves a more skilled military tactician than his men believed, masterminding an attack which results in Kildaer's death. Soon thereafter, the runner returns with news that every village in the vicinity has been destroyed, and an undead army is amassing nearby. Crüniac sets fire to the Keep, and The Legion flee into the Clouspine Mountains.

Their rearguard is attacked, and Crüniac mortally wounded. With his dying words, he reveals the undead are led by Soulblighter. The rest of The Legion make it to a World Knot and teleport to Madrigal, where they inform Alric of Soulblighter's return. Alric fears he is trying to find "The Summoner", who, it is foretold, will resurrect the Myrkridia. News soon arrives that Soulblighter has sacked several cities as he moves towards Madrigal, and that Shiver, a Fallen Lord killed during the Great War, has been resurrected. Alric is soon forced to abandon Madrigal, fighting his way through a Myrkridian assault led by Shiver.

The Legion head to Tandem, where Alric plans to hold the fortress at White Falls, on the river Meander, thus preventing Shiver from moving north. Meanwhile, he decides to find The Deceiver, a Fallen Lord who was openly antagonistic towards the others during the Great War. He was thought killed, but his actual fate remains unknown. Alric sends a small detachment to The Deceiver's last known location, and they learn he was trapped in the Dramas River when it froze solid around him, forcing him to use what little sorcery he had left to keep himself alive, unable to break free. The detachment locate and release him, and he advises them to head north to enlist the aid of the Trow, allies of his in ancient times. The Legion do so, and the Trow agree to join the fight against Soulblighter.

The detachment, The Deceiver and the Trow head south and meet with the rest of The Legion, learning Tandem has fallen. However, Alric has ordered The Legion to recapture Muirthemne, formerly Llancarfan, capital of the Cath Bruig Empire. His plan is to find the Ibis Crown in the city's haunted catacombs, and reclaim the title of Emperor, rallying humanity behind him. A small group of volunteers enter the crypts of the city and find the Crown, with Alric declared the new Emperor, and the journeymen resuming their position as the Emperor's Royal Guard; the Heron Guard.

Meanwhile, The Deceiver and a detachment travel to Forest Heart to locate a fragment of the Tain, in which Alric believes The Summoner to be hiding. They successfully find the fragment, enter the Tain, and kill The Summoner, cutting off Soulblighter from the Myrkridia. Acting on his own authority, The Deceiver then attacks Soulblighter's camp, but he and his men are captured. Phelot, a shade in charge of the prison, is in the service of The Deceiver, and frees them. The Deceiver attacks Soulblighter, who turns into a murder of crows to escape. He succeeds, but The Deceiver kills one of the crows, preventing him from fleeing in this manner again. The detachment then meet a scouting party near Silvermines; Alric and The Legion are moving to attack Soulblighter, but have been pinned down by Shiver, whom The Deceiver immediately heads to confront. He hunts her down, and Phelot destroys her army. The Deceiver then kills her, but her death triggers a magical energy backlash that also kills him.

With Shiver dead, Soulblighter is forced back against the Cloudspine. His army is defeated, but he flees into the volcano Tharsis, where he plans to shatter the Cloudspine itself, causing widespread devastation. Alric and The Legion pursue him, and Alric breaks the rock on which he stands, plunging him to his death in the molten lava. With Soulblighter's death, the narrator learns of "The Leveler", an immortal evil spirit. The forces of Light and Dark rule the world successively in thousand-year cycles, with each Age of Light climaxing with the arrival of The Leveler, who ushers in an Age of Darkness. The Leveler inhabits the body of the hero who defeated him in the previous cycle — thus the hero who saves civilization is destined to destroy it - as a result Connacht returned as Balor. Soulblighter was not The Leveler; he tried to force the cycle, and as a result may have broken it. Whether this is the case will not be known for over nine hundred years, when it comes Alric's time to assume the mantle of The Leveler.

=== Myth II: Chimera ===
When Alric restored the Cath Bruig Empire and reformed the Heron Guard, Four Bear Silent Oak chose to remain a journeyman, electing to lead a life of scholarship. Now, ten years later, he is plagued by visions of a mysterious woman, and a foreboding sense of evil. Convinced he must act, he seeks out his old ally, the legendary warrior Fenris, who has isolated himself in the fir'Bolg forest of Ruewood. Fenris agrees to join Four Bear, and they decide to elicit the aid of ne'Ric, a celebrated fir'Bolg. However, they soon learn the Banded Wasps of Ruewood, a normally peaceful race of giant wasps, have suddenly become aggressive.

Fending off an attack by the Banded Wasps, and accompanied by fir'Bolg, a band of human warriors, and several dwarves, they head to the tomb of their former ally, Kyrand the Mage, where Fenris plans to take possession of Kyrand's amulet. There, they encounter the woman from Four Bear's visions; a sorceress named Kyrilla, who also plans to retrieve the amulet. She orders an army of Thrall to prevent Four Bear, Fenris and their men entering, but they defeat the army. Kyrilla disappears, and they enter the tomb, retrieve the amulet, and resume their search for ne'Ric, who is fighting the Banded Wasps elsewhere in Ruewood. As they search, they again encounter Kyrilla, who reveals it is she who is behind the Banded Wasps' attack. They eventually find ne'Ric, and force the Wasps to retreat.

Fenris then receives a letter from Baron Geoffrey Volsung begging him for help, as he believes Kyrilla has put in motion a plot to assassinate him. Fenris, Four Bear, ne'Ric and their men head to meet Volsung on the beachhead at Cavanaugh. Upon arriving, Volsung accuses them of betraying him. Fenris is able to convince him he is incorrect, narrowly avoiding a clash between Volsung's army and their own men. They then help his men repel an attack from an army of undead. Kyrilla appears, revealing she had hoped Volsung and Fenris would kill one another. Awaiting an attack in her castle, she summons the power of her "Lord", begging him to give her the strength to avenge her father's death.

The heroes and their army attack the castle, defeating Kyrilla's undead legions. She confronts them, revealing herself to be Kyrand's daughter. Four Bear gives her Kyrand's amulet, in which are stored his memories, and she realizes her "Lord", the demon Cartuke, was actually the one who killed Kyrand, who sacrificed his own life to wound Cartuke and save the lives of Fenris, Four Bear and ne'Ric. Cartuke had been manipulating Kyrilla in an effort to regain his power, but now she sees the truth, and joins the others. They head to his lair, finding him inside an energy sphere. Killing all of their men, he leaves only Fenris, Four Bear, ne'Ric and Kyrilla. In an effort to distract him, Fenris and Kyrilla attack, and as he turns them to stone, ne'Ric fires a magical arrow which kills him. Four Bear laments that once again, he has failed to save the lives of his friends, but he and ne'Ric take some consolation in the knowledge that Cartuke has finally been defeated.

== Development ==
Bungie conceived of Soulblighter prior to the release of The Fallen Lords in 1997, with the only thing that would prevent them from making it being if The Fallen Lords was a commercial failure. However, when the original game proved a success, becoming Bungie's biggest selling game thus far, the sequel immediately went into development. One of their main goals with the sequel was to include numerous gameplay aspects and game mechanics which they had wanted to feature in The Fallen Lords, but had been unable to implement due to time constraints. Alex Seropian, co-founder of Bungie, explained that "there were still some things at the end of Myth that we wanted to do, but we just ran out of time. Myth was a terrific product, but we knew we could do a lot better". Of the initial planning for Soulblighter, Seropian said:

We had a lot of specific design goals for Myth II. Part of those things are enhancements to the engine as well as the gameplay. There were some things in the gameplay and artificial intelligence that made the original annoyingly difficult, and those were some of the things we wanted to enhance. In addition to that, we decided to touch basically every facet of the game. We wanted to make the music and sound better, the graphics - so we basically retouched every area of the Myth gaming experience.

New to Soulblighter were moving 3D models within the gaming world, something none of Bungie staff had ever created before. For example, the opening level features a fully functional windmill, and a later level features a drawbridge that closes as the level begins, and which the player must then lower so their army can gain access to a castle. Although the original game featured the same kind of 3D polygonal models, none of them moved, and implementing this feature proved to be one of the biggest challenges the team encountered in making the game. Another challenge also involved something not seen in the first game; a level set indoors. For this level, which is set in a large castle, the AI had to be rewritten as two enemy units could be right beside one another but not be able to see each other because of a wall between them. Previously, two units standing beside one another would automatically attack. Writing this new code into the AI scripting language proved especially difficult for the programmers.

The team also approached the cutscenes differently. In The Fallen Lords, the cutscenes had been created by an American animation studio, but had received a mixed response from both the developers and fans of the game, with some feeling they felt cartoony, and were tonally disconnected from the rest of the game. This was something the team wanted to ensure was not repeated in Soulblighter. As Seropian explains:

Myth has a different style to it, almost like a classic kind of look, and we just thought that rendered animation wouldn't look as good with it, so we went with cel animation. Some people liked it, some people didn't, and in the final analysis we decided that it looked a little more cartoon-like than we wanted. For Myth II we decided to go with a Japanese company and have more of an anime style, more of a cutting-edge, rougher-edge look and feel to the animation.

In terms of the game's graphics, as with The Fallen Lords, each level in Soulblighter is constructed on a polygonal mesh. The mesh used is four times finer than in the original, and hence the graphics are more detailed and smoother. Also like the first game, although the game world itself is fully 3D, the characters populating each level are 2D sprites; those in Soulblighter have many more frames of animation than those in The Fallen Lords, and so move much more smoothly. Explaining why the team stuck with using 2D sprites in a 3D terrain, producer Tuncer Deniz states:

It's a performance issue. The reason we went with sprites for the characters is because in Myth you can have one hundred units on the screen at the same time, and if they were all polygonal models, even those with the fastest home computers wouldn't be able to play the game.

=== Delays ===
Originally scheduled for North American release on November 1, 1998, Bungie were unable to have the game ready in time. According to Tuncer Deniz, the initial release date was missed because of "the time frame given to do the game, which was very small as opposed to most major titles. We added so many new things - ultimately that ends up extending the development cycle". The team then set a release date for just prior to Christmas, meaning the game would need to go gold by the first week of December.

By November 13, Bungie were still writing code for individual levels, although lead programmer Jason Regier felt "it seemed there was an end in sight". On November 21, the team held a meeting, discussing whether to continue to aim for the Christmas deadline, or work to incorporate all of the still-evolving gameplay ideas and fix every bug, which would mean almost certainly missing the deadline. Deniz ultimately argued the team should continue to develop the gameplay and fix bugs, but they would also need to accept that not every detail they wanted to add was going to be included. Day later, Diane Donohue (director of operations) and Doug Zartman (director of public relations) sent out one-hundred-and-forty copies of the game to game reviewers across North America. The staff at Bungie had become so stretched trying to finish the game on time that Donohue and Zartman were hand inking the "This Game Is Huge" blurb, and then pressing them onto the boxes themselves.

The team decided to aim for a December 13 finish, which would get the game on shelves between Christmas and the new year. Zartman explained: "It's not as catastrophic as it sounds. The second biggest time to buy games is immediately after Christmas. Gamers are taking back the game they didn't want and getting the game they did want - and they've also got all that holiday money". By December 7, the entire Bungie staff were either playtesting the game or fixing bugs. On December 10, the game went gold, with Zartman sending out an email to gaming websites:

Bungie Software tiredly but happily announces that Myth II: Soulblighter, sequel to 1997's seminal 3D strategy title Myth: The Fallen Lords, has gone to replication. As you read this, a plant somewhere in Atlanta is replicating and boxing hundreds of thousands of copies and preparing to ship them to the far corners of North America. Elsewhere in the world, GT Interactive, Pacific Software Publishing and other publishing partners are doing the same ... this sequel has been turned in a mere seven months.

The game made it to store shelves on December 28.

=== Uninstall bug ===
The day the game was shipped to stores, Bungie's head-office was contacted by their Japanese publisher, who informed them a woman working on the Asian translation of the game had discovered a major bug in the Windows version. She had installed the game in the root directory of her hard drive, and then used the uninstall program to uninstall it. The game was successfully uninstalled, but much of the contents of her hard drive were also erased. Jason Jones attempted to replicate the problem, quickly discovering what was wrong, and figuring out how to correct the faulty code. Roughly 200,000 copies of the game were already in transit to major retail stores across North America. Jones, Alex Seropian, Doug Zartman, Diane Donohue, and David Joost (sales and marketing director) quickly convened a meeting to decide what to do. The team essentially had two choices. On the one hand, they could say nothing, and quietly fix the bug in a patch that would be immediately made available for download on their website. In favor of this course of action, it was argued that installing a game to the root directory of a hard drive was an unusual thing to do, something there was little chance of anyone repeating, and so it was unlikely anyone would ever encounter the bug. The other option was to publicly announce the problem and recall the game. This is what they did. According to Jones:

The thing that made the decision easy was that if we were to ship the game anyway and try to fix the problem later, some people were gonna get screwed. And that was wrong. It might not have been very many people - maybe one or two. But it would have bothered us the rest of our lives. Maybe not - maybe just two years. We'd be sitting around today: "Damn, wonder when the next person's gonna call?" It was so clear that there was one decision that led down the road of eternal damnation. The other was to spend a lot of money and do the right thing - and never make the same mistake again.

Bungie recalled every shipped unit of the game, a decision which cost them $800,000 in expenses and fines from retailers for missing their release deadline. Meanwhile, Donohue called the Bungie factory in Atlanta and told the production managers to immediately stop printing copies of the game, and hold any shipments that hadn't already gone out, while Joost began calling the stores that were still awaiting shipments, telling them to refuse any orders that arrived. As the units that were in transit began to arrive back at the factory, each individual one had to be repackaged by hand. Joost explains:

You open the carton, then the box for each individual unit, take out the jewel case, unwrap the shrink wrap, take out the old CD and destroy it, put in the new CD, re-shrink-wrap the jewel case, repack it in the box, put on a new UPC label that would electronically read this as version 1.1, and put a red sticker on the box saying that this is the new updated version 1.1.

By December 30, v1.1 was on the way to stores. Bungie also issued a statement on their website telling players who had managed to get a copy of v1.0 to uninstall the game by manually dragging the game's folder to the recycle bin. They also made the v1.1 patch available for download. The gaming press lauded Bungie's handling of the situation, praising their decision to take the financial hit and recall the game.

=== "Fear" and "Loathing" ===
Screenshot from Blue & Grey, an American Civil War era total conversion, created by the community using the Fear and Loathing tools

With the release of Soulblighter, Bungie included two programming tools called "Fear" and "Loathing", which allowed players to create new units and maps. Both The Fallen Lords and Soulblighter had been created using four tools developed by Bungie themselves; "Tag Editor" edited the constants stored in the cross-platform data files; "Extractor" handled the 2D sprites and the sequencing of their animations; "Loathing" acted as the map editor; and "Fear" dealt with the 3D polygonal models such as houses, pillars, and walls. Speaking of Fear and Loathing, The Fallen Lords's producer and programmer Jason Jones explains: "Loathing is basically the map editor for Myth. You import your map into it, you change the heights, and you place your units on the map in Loathing. Fear takes care of all the models; it is used to import the 3D rendered models into Myth".

Loathing was specifically built around the Myth engine and allowed the team to modify the 3D landscape, apply lighting, determine terrain type, script the AI, and position structures, scenery, and enemies. The 3D models were then imported into the game using Fear. Bungie themselves strongly encouraged the creativity of their fan base in using these tools. For example, in April 1999, they issued a press release regarding the World War II total conversion Myth II: Recon, saying that "this kind of plug-in was exactly what the Myth II tools were intended to inspire, and is an excellent sign that Myth mapmakers are taking this game world in fascinating new directions".

=== Technology ===
The Fallen Lords originally supported both software rendering and 3dfx's Glide hardware acceleration. Soon after it was released, Bungie released a v1.1 upgrade patch, which added support for Rendition's Redline, and 3dfx's Voodoo Rush. Soulblighter originally supported software rendering, all 3dfx and Rendition GPUs, and any graphics cards that supported Direct3D for Windows and QuickDraw 3D for Mac. The game also supported 3D audio, specifically Aureal Semiconductor's A3D and Creative Labs' EAX.

=== Later releases ===
In 1999, Bungie re-released Soulblighter for Mac OS and Windows as part of a special edition called Myth: The Total Codex. The bundle included The Fallen Lords, Soulblighter v1.3 (Bungie's last official update of the game), the Soulblighter expansion pack Myth II: Chimera (developed by the Myth mapmaker group Badlands, in association with Bungie themselves), and official Strategies and Secrets guides for both of the main games. Soulblighter was later ported to Linux by Loki Entertainment.

In June 2000, Take-Two Interactive, who had purchased 19.9% of Bungie's shares in 1999, acquired the Oni and Myth intellectual properties after Bungie was purchased outright by Microsoft. Take-Two's first Myth release was Green Berets: Powered by Myth II in July 2001. Set in the Vietnam War, Green Berets is a total conversion of the Soulblighter engine, and includes a copy of Soulblighter, as well as the Fear and Loathing tools. Developed by mapmakers from within the Myth community, in association with TalonSoft, Green Berets also features eight new multiplayer maps, and the option to use Green Berets units while playing the Soulblighter single-player campaign. Take-Two's second release was Myth II: Worlds in October. Worlds includes a copy of Soulblighter, the Soulblighter Strategies and Secrets guide in PDF form, and two disks of fan-created single-player campaigns, multiplayer maps, and gameplay mods.

== Community ==
Although the official Bungie.net Myth servers closed in February 2002, the Myth series continued to have an active online fanbase for over a decade, particularly Soulblighter. After Bungie released the Total Codex bundle in 1999, which contained The Fallen Lords v1.3, Soulblighter v1.3 and the Soulblighter expansion pack, Myth II: Chimera, they ceased working to develop the game's source code, as Microsoft, who purchased the company in 2000, wanted them to concentrate on Halo. As such, they were approached by a group of programmers, artists and coders known as MythDevelopers, who asked for access to the code so as to continue its development. With the blessing of Take-Two, Bungie released their entire archive of Myth-related materials to MythDevelopers, including the source code, artwork, all creative files, and documentation. MythDevelopers were also granted access to the source code for Myth III: The Wolf Age, which was developed by MumboJumbo in 2001. Bungie also open sourced their Myth metaserver source code in 2002.

MythDevelopers used this material to improve and further develop the games. Although their initial focus was on the bug-ridden release version of The Wolf Age, they also worked to update the first two games to newer operating systems on both Mac and PC, fix bugs, and create unofficial patches to enhance both the games themselves and the mapmaking tools. They also developed their own library, dubbed the Myth Core Library, which provided networking, input routines, and other low-level functions. This enabled MythDevelopers to avoid the necessity of licensing any external libraries, and instead allowed them to develop everything in-house. This was part of their deal with Take-Two, as they couldn't incorporate anything into the games which they would be unable to give Take-Two the rights to should the company ever ask for the source code back; all modifications remained the intellectual property of Take-Two, who were free to use them in a future commercial version of Myth, if they ever wanted to re-release an upgraded version of one or more of the games, or incorporate the modifications into the development of a new Myth game.

MythDevelopers disbanded in December 2003, with Project Magma becoming the main development group for The Fallen Lords and Soulblighter, and FlyingFlip Studios for The Wolf Age. From 2003 to 2018, Magma released several major patches for Soulblighter, each of which featured fixes for bugs, graphical problems, gameplay problems, and interface issues, as well as improve the Fear and Loathing tools and the online multiplayer mode.

== Reception ==
Reception

Aggregate score
Aggregator	Score
Metacritic	88/100

Review scores
Publication	Score
GameRevolution	A−
GameSpot	9.3/10
IGN	8.9/10
Next Generation	4/5 (PC and Mac)
PC Gamer (US)	88%
PC Zone	8.5/10
Macworld	4.5/5

Soulblighter received "generally favorable reviews". It holds an aggregate score of 88 out of 100 on Metacritic, based on twelve reviews.

GameSpot's Michael E. Ryan scored the game 9.3 out of 10, calling it "about as good as a computer game can possibly be". He felt it improved on the original in every way, specifically citing the graphics, gameplay, and multiplayer mode. He also praised the mapmaking tools. He concluded: "Bungie basically improved all the good features in Myth; added a number of gameplay, multiplayer, and graphical enhancements; and then threw in some slick and powerful editing tools to boot. The end result is one of the best games to be released this year".

Game Revolution's Calvin Hubble rated the game an A−, calling it "both one of the best sequels to hit the scene and one of the finest titles on the RTS market". He too felt it improved on the original, writing: "Bungie did an excellent job at reading the faults of the original by making change where change was needed and leaving the successful areas alone". He praised the level design and gameplay variety, citing "some of the most creative and immersive environments in the industry". He also lauded the graphics and multiplayer mode, concluding "Myth II offers the best real-time strategy experience in the industry. It has everything that made Myth one of the best games of last year, plus a free set of steak knives ... Myth II is simply one of the best sequels ever designed".

IGN's Tal Blevins scored it 8.9 out of 10, praising Bungie for seeking fan feedback from The Fallen Lords, and implementing the most requested changes. He was especially impressed with the graphics, writing as "watching a line of troops wade across a stream, their reflections bobbing in the river's current is simply spectacular". He concluded by "highly recommending this game to anyone, even those who have never played an RTS game before ... Myth II breathes enough new life back into this series to qualify as an incredibly fun game with tons of replayability".

PC Zone's Paul Mallinson scored it 8.5 out of 10. He praised the improved controls, and the enhancements made to the game engine, concluding: "If you liked the original Myth, you'll love this. Graphically, Soulblighter is much better, and there's not much wrong with the gameplay. There's a fine single-player game to get your teeth into, and an easily workable multiplayer alternative to back it up. There's even a campaign editor which enables you to make your own missions. Add all these things together and you have to conclude that Myth II: Soulblighter is undoubtedly an excellent package".

CNET Gamecenter named Myth II the best Macintosh game of 1999. It was a finalist for Computer Games Strategy Plus's 1998 "Real-Time Strategy Game of the Year" award, which ultimately went to StarCraft.

Next Generation reviewed the PC and Mac versions of the game, rating them four stars out of five, and stated that "Myth II: Soulblighter's charm lies in a bundle of improvements and high production values that make the parts greater than the whole. While it may not have reached WarCraft or C&C status yet, the series is deservedly a growing legend in its own time".

=== Sales ===
Soulblighter considerably outsold The Fallen Lords, which had been Bungie's best selling game up to that point. In North America, pre-orders for the game reached 140,000 units. When v1.1 was released on January 7, day one sales equaled the number of units the original sold worldwide in total; 350,000. In the United States alone, it sold 87,175 copies by April 2000.
