= Myth: The Fallen Lords =

1997 video game

- Developer: Bungie
- Publishers: NA: Bungie; EU: Eidos Interactive
- Producer: Jason Jones
- Programmers: Jason Jones; Ryan Martell; Jason Regier; Alex Rosenberg
- Artists: Mark Bernal; Robert McLees; Frank Pusateri
- Writers: Jason Jones; Robert McLees; Doug Zartman
- Composers: Martin O'Donnell; Michael Salvatori; Paul Heitsch
- Series: Myth
- Platforms: Windows; Mac OS
- Release: NA: November 7, 1997; EU: February 2, 1998
- Genre: Real-time tactics
- Modes: Single-player, multiplayer

Myth: The Fallen Lords is a 1997 real-time tactics video game developed by Bungie for Windows and Mac OS. Released in November 1997 in North America and in February 1998 in Europe, the game was published by Bungie in North America and by Eidos Interactive in Europe. At the time, Bungie was known primarily as developers of Mac games, and The Fallen Lords was the first game Bungie had developed and released simultaneously for both PC and Mac. It is the first game in the Myth series, which also includes a sequel, Myth II: Soulblighter, set sixty years after the events of the first game, also developed by Bungie, and a prequel, Myth III: The Wolf Age, set one thousand years prior to the events depicted in The Fallen Lords, and developed by MumboJumbo.

The game tells the story of the battle between the forces of the "Light" and those of the "Dark" for control of an unnamed mythical land. The Dark are led by Balor and a group of lieutenants (the titular Fallen Lords), whilst the Light are led by "The Nine"; powerful sorcerers known as "Avatara", chief amongst whom is Alric. The game begins in the seventeenth year of the war in the West, some fifty years since the rise of Balor, with the forces of Light on the brink of defeat; almost the entire land is under the dominion of the Dark, with only one major city and a few smaller towns remaining under the control of the Light. The plot follows the activities of "The Legion", an elite unit in the army of the Light, as they attempt to turn back the tide and defeat Balor.

The Fallen Lords received positive reviews from critics. Reviewers praised its plot, graphics, gameplay, level design, online multiplayer mode, and differentiation from traditional real-time strategy games. The most often criticized aspects were the difficulty of the single-player campaign, which many reviewers felt was far too high, even on the lowest setting, and some awkwardness in controlling units. The game went on to win multiple awards, including "Strategy Game of the Year" from both PC Gamer and Computer Gaming World, and "Game of the Year" from both Computer Games Strategy Plus and Macworld. It was also a commercial success, selling over 350,000 units worldwide across both systems, earning back roughly seven times its budget. At the time, it was Bungie's most successful game, and served to bring them to the attention of PC gamers and, more specifically, Microsoft, who would purchase the company in 2000.

The Myth series as a whole, and Soulblighter in particular, supported an active online community for over a decade after the official servers went offline. The first formally organized group of volunteer-programmers was MythDevelopers, who were given access to the game's source code by Bungie. The most recently active Myth development group is Project Magma, an offshoot of MythDevelopers. These groups have worked to provide ongoing technical support for the games, update them to newer operating systems, fix bugs, release unofficial patches, create mods, and maintain online servers for multiplayer gaming.

== Gameplay ==
Myth: The Fallen Lords is a real-time tactics game. Unlike real-time strategy games, the player does not have to engage in resource micromanagement or economic macromanagement, does not have to construct a base or buildings, and does not have to gradually build up their army by acquiring resources and researching new technologies. Instead, each level begins with the player's army already assembled and ready for combat. During the game, the player controls forces of various sizes made up of a number of different units, each possessing their own strengths and weaknesses. In single-player mode, only Light units are playable, but in online multiplayer mode, the player can control both Light and Dark units.

Screenshot of gameplay in The Fallen Lords, showing the selection of multiple units. The player has selected five Berserks (the five units on the left, each surrounding by a yellow rectangle). The image also shows unselected archers and dwarves, who are currently attacking enemy units. At the top of the screen is the Status Bar. The mini-map of the battlefield is just below on the right.

Basic gameplay involves the player selecting and commanding units. To select an individual unit, the player clicks on that unit. Once selected, the unit is surrounded by a yellow rectangle, beside which is a health meter, which diminishes as the unit takes damage. Units do not regenerate health, and there is no way to construct new units (although in some single-player missions, reinforcements are automatically received at predetermined points). To select all nearby units of a given type, the player double-clicks on any individual unit of that type. To select multiple units of different types, the player can either "shift click" (hold down the shift key and click on each individual unit) or use "band-selection" (click and hold the mouse button on a piece of ground, then drag the cursor across the screen. This causes a yellow box to appear, which grows and shrinks as it follows the cursor's movement. When the player releases the button, any units within the box are selected). The player can instantly select all units on screen, irrespective of type, by pressing the enter key. The player can also assign manually selected unit groupings to a specific key on the keyboard, and when that key is pressed, it instantly selects the desired group of units.

Once one or more units have been selected, the player can click on the ground to make them walk to the selected spot, or click on an enemy to make them attack. Units with projectile weapons, such as archers and dwarves can also be ordered to attack a specific spot on the ground, rather than an enemy. It is also important that the player have their units facing in the right direction. This is accomplished by "gesture clicking"—using the mouse to indicate which way the units will face when they reach their destination. Gesture clicking is especially important when using formations, of which there are nine available. After selecting a group of units, the player must press the corresponding formation button on the keyboard, and then click on the ground where they want the units to form. The player can also order all selected units to scatter and to retreat.

When a single unit is selected, information about that unit appears in the "Status Bar" at the top of the HUD; the unit's name, a brief biography, how many kills he has, how many battles he has survived, and (if he is capable of carrying items) his inventory. When multiple units are selected, the names, types, and quantity of units will appear, but there will be no biography or information on their kills or previous battles. If no units are selected, the Status Bar provides details of the current mission. The HUD also features a transparent overhead mini-map, which displays information about the current battlefield; the player's field of vision is indicated by a yellow trapezoid, enemy units appear as red dots, friendly non-playable units as blue dots, and the player's army as green dots. The player can click anywhere on the mini-map to instantly jump to that location. However, the mini-map does not initially display the entire battlefield; the player must explore the area for it to become fully mapped.

The player has full control over the camera throughout the game, and can move it backwards and forwards, left and right, orbit left and right (keeps the camera focused on a single spot while making a 360 degree circle around that spot), pan left and right (the camera remains in the same spot but the player's point of view moves from side to side), and zoom in and out. All movements can be carried out via the keyboard, although the mouse can also be used to move the camera forwards, backwards, left and right, by moving the cursor to the top, bottom, left or right of the screen, respectively.

Selecting and commanding units only forms the basic gameplay of The Fallen Lords. The battles are more complex than simply commanding units to attack the enemy, with strategy and awareness of the conditions of the battlefield, and even the weather, also playing important roles. For example, due to the game's physics engine, objects react with one another, with units, and with the terrain. This can manifest itself simply in a severed head bouncing off one of the player's units and changing direction, but it can also have more serious consequences. For example, a dwarf could throw a molotov cocktail at an enemy on a hillside and miss, with the projectile rolling back down the hill towards the player's own units. Projectiles in general, both those used by the player and the enemy, have no guarantee of hitting anything; they are merely propelled in the direction instructed by the physics engine. Arrows, for example, may miss their intended target due to a small degree of simulated aiming error that becomes more significant at long range, or the target may move out of the way, or behind a tree or building. If archers are firing at enemies who are engaged in melee combat, they may also hit the player's own units instead of the enemy, causing the same amount of damage. This is also true of dwarves' Molotov cocktails. As such, friendly fire is an important aspect of the game. The weather is also something the player must always bear in mind. For example, rain or snow can put out explosive-based attacks. It is also much easier for projectile units to hit enemies below them rather than above them, and as such, positioning of the player's units is an important aspect of the game.

=== Single-player ===
In the single-player campaign, the player starts each mission with a group of soldiers, and must use that group to accomplish a specific goal or set of goals. These goals can involve killing a certain number of enemies, defending a location, reaching a certain point on the map, escorting a unit safely to a certain area, or destroying a specific object or enemy. The focus of the single-player campaign is on a smaller force defeating a much larger enemy force; in every mission, the Light units are outnumbered by enemies, often vastly, and so the player must use the terrain, employ the specific skills of their individual units, and gradually decrease the enemy force, or attempt to avoid it altogether. Units in the single-player campaign acquire experience with each kill. Experience increases attack rate, accuracy, and defence, and any unit that survives a battle will carry over to the next battle with their accumulated experience (assuming the next battle features units of that type).

=== Multiplayer ===
When it was released, The Fallen Lords could be used for multiplayer gaming on Bungie, TEN, or via a LAN on PC or AppleTalk on Mac. In multiplayer, the player starts with an army, and can customize it by trading units with other players, using point values that approximate the value of the units being traded.

Multiplayer games include "King Of The Hill" (a hill on the map is marked with a flag, with the hill captured when one or more of a team's units move within a certain range of the flag and eliminate any enemy units in the same area; the winner is the team who controls the hill for the longest amount of time), "Steal The Bacon" (somewhere on the battlefield is a ball; the object is to get the ball and keep it away from the opponents, with the winner being the last team to touch the ball), "Balls On Parade" (each team has a ball; the object is to capture as many of the opponents' balls as possible, with winner being the team in possession of the most balls at the end of the game), "Flag Rally" (a number of flags are on the battlefield, with the winner being the first player to touch them all), "Territories" (a number of flags are on the battlefield, with the winner being the team to capture and hold the most flags), "Scavenger Hunt" (a number of balls are on the battlefield, with the winner being the first player to touch them all), "Captures" (a number of balls are on the battlefield, with the winner being the player who is in possession of the most balls at the end of the match), "Body Count" (team deathmatch), and "Last Man On The Hill" (whichever player owns the hill when time runs out is the winner).

== Story ==
=== History ===
In the history of Myth, one particularly celebrated legend is that of Connacht, who, one thousand years ago, saved the world from a race of flesh-eating monsters called the Myrkridia, which had hunted humanity to near extinction over the previous millennium. Coming from the eastern land of Gower at the same time a comet appeared in the western skies, Connacht was the first human to fight the Myrkridia and survive. However, not only did he survive, he defeated them, ultimately imprisoning them in a magical prison known as the Tain, built for him by the Dwarven smiths of Muirthemne. With the Myrkridia gone, Connacht became Emperor of the Cath Bruig, presiding over a prosperous era known as the Age of Light. Many years later, he disappeared from the historical records. It is unknown exactly what happened to him, although one theory suggests he went in search of powerful magical artifacts, fearful of the ramifications if such items should fall into the wrong hands. Whatever the truth about his disappearance, Connacht was never seen again.

In more recent times, fifty years prior to the beginning of the game, Balor, a mysterious and evil being, attacked the eastern Empire with an undead army, sacking Muirthemne. Aided by lieutenants known as "Fallen Lords", Balor turned the farmlands surrounding Muirthemne into a barren desert called The Barrier, whilst the Dwarven cities of Myrgard and Stoneheim were captured by Ghôls. The Dwarven population became refugees, travelling west, into the land known as The Province. Eventually, every human city to the east of the Cloudspine Mountains fell under Balor's control. Thirty-three years later, he headed west. Within two years, Covenant, capital city of The Province, had fallen. Tyr, the last free city of the south, was destroyed five years later, ten years prior to current events, leaving only the free cities of the west to stand against Balor.

=== Plot ===
The game begins seventeen years after Balor crossed the Cloudspine, with the forces of Light losing the war badly. They are led by "The Nine", a group of avatara, chief amongst whom is Alric. The story is told through the journal entries of a soldier in "The Legion", an elite unit in the army. As the game begins, a berserk runs into the camp of The Nine, and gives them an urn. They extract a severed head, which opens its eyes.

The game then cuts to The Legion as they head to the city of Madrigal, headquarters of The Nine, which is under siege by Shiver (one of the Fallen), with the army planning to attack her from behind. The plan works, and after four days, the siege is lifted. Of particular significance is that Rabican (one of The Nine) kills Shiver in a "dream duel". Rabican had been advised by the Head, who claims to be an ancient enemy of Balor, that Shiver's one real weakness was her vanity, and his victory represents the first time one of the Fallen has been defeated. After this a detachment of the Legion is sent to the ruins of Covenant, a major city destroyed in the earlier years of the war, to find the Total Codex. The Total Codex is an ancient book that reputedly has the past, present, and future written within its pages. The Legion successfully retrieves the codex while skirmishing with the Fallen Lord known as the Watcher. During this time Alric, an Avatara of the Nine, is sent east with an army on the advice of the head to recover another magical artifact. The Legion then meet with Maeldun (one of The Nine) in the city of Scales, where they learn Rabican's army is heading to block Seven Gates and Bagrada, two of the passes through the Cloudspine Mountains, so as to prevent The Deceiver (one of the Fallen) crossing west prior to winter. Rabican holds Seven Gates, and The Legion hold Bagrada, but their victory is tempered by the fact that The Watcher (another of the Fallen) remains behind their lines, and Alric and his army are trapped beyond the Cloudspine.

News soon reaches The Nine that Alric's army has been destroyed, and he has been captured by The Deceiver. He was sent to The Barrier to search for a suit of enchanted armor by the Head, who now claims to have been an ally of Connacht, although some are beginning to doubt the veracity of its claims. A small group from The Legion fly over the mountains in a hot air balloon, and rescue Alric. The Legion is then ordered to Silvermines to look for The Watcher's arm, lost when Balor freed him from captivity beneath the Cloudspine, as The Nine believe the arm can be used to fashion a weapon to use against The Watcher. However, The Deceiver is also in Silvermines searching for the arm, as he and The Watcher were enemies before the rise of Balor. The Legion find the arm, but soon thereafter, a volcano erupts, melting the snow on the Cloudspine, and allowing The Deceiver to move west. At the same time, The Watcher attacks Rabican's army, crushing it. The army of The Deceiver, heading west, and the army of The Watcher, pursuing the remnants of Rabican's army east, begin to fight one another, with Maeldun using the distraction to retake the passes.

The following spring, Cu Roi and Murgen (two of The Nine) take four thousand men into occupied eastern territory to try to gain the support of the Forest Giants. They agree to join the Light, but Soulblighter (Balor's chief lieutenant) springs a surprise attack, trapping The Legion within the Tain; an artifact small enough to hold in one's hand, but which contains a pocket universe of limitless capacity. A group of fifty men led by Murgen find the battle standard of the long-dead Myrkridia, and shortly thereafter, Murgen finds a secret exit. He is able to open it, but the rest of the four thousand men are lost, as is Cu Roi, whilst Murgen is killed as he destroys the Tain. Shocked at their escape, Soulblighter flees, but news soon arrives that Maeldun has lost Bagrada, and The Deceiver has crossed west. Also, when the remainder of The Nine tried to destroy the Head, which they have come to believe has been betraying them, they were prevented from doing so by the army, with two of The Nine killed in the ensuing conflict. Meanwhile, Alric joins The Legion.

Rather than returning west, Alric leads The Legion north, moving towards Balor's fortress in Rhi'anon, capital city of the Trow, an ancient race of giants thought extinct until they joined the war against the Light. Believing they can do nothing to save any of the remaining free cities from The Deceiver, Alric hopes to achieve a more important victory; during his captivity in The Barrier, he learned that to ensure the obedience of the Fallen Lords, Balor bound them to his will, and is channeling his power to them. Thus, if he were destroyed, they would lose their power, ending the war. Leaving a garrison of men behind to delay the pursuing Soulblighter, Alric plans to attack The Watcher using arrows tipped with bone from his arm. The plan works; The Watcher is killed, scattering his army and clearing the way ahead, whilst Soulblighter breaks off his pursuit.

At the same time as a comet appears in the western skies, Alric orders the majority of the surviving members of the Legion, twenty-two hundred men, to launch a frontal attack on Balor's fortress in a suicide mission designed to cause a distraction, as he takes the remaining one-hundred men through a World Knot (a teleportation device) to a spot behind the fortress. As they near the fortress, Alric tells the stunned soldiers that Balor is in fact Connacht, and with this in mind, he intends to raise the Myrkridian battle standard found in the Tain, hoping to enrage Balor into making a tactical error. The plan works; furious at the sight of the flag, Balor leaves the fortress, and Alric immobilizes him with an Eblis Stone. The Legion kills him, and take his head to a bottomless pit known as "The Great Devoid", as only by throwing his head into the Devoid can he be destroyed. The thirty remaining members of The Legion are ambushed by Soulblighter as they approach the Devoid, but they fight their way through, and fling the head into the pit. Soulblighter turns into a murder of crows and flees, moments before a massive explosion erupts from within the Devoid. With Balor's destruction, the remaining Fallen are rendered powerless, and their armies collapse, bringing to an end the war between the Light and the Dark.

== Development ==
=== Origins ===
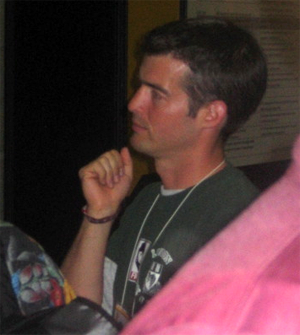
Jason Jones conceived of The Fallen Lords as an alternative to Bungie developing another first-person shooter.

The Fallen Lords was originally conceived by Jason Jones as Bungie were nearing the end of development of Marathon 2: Durandal in late 1995. They had planned to do another first-person shooter as their next game. However, the initial screenshots of id Software's Quake had just been released, and when Jones saw them, he felt Bungie's new game was shaping up as too similar. As such, he approached his colleagues with the question: "What do you think about having this world with 100 guys fighting 100 other guys in 3D?" Bungie had worked on several 3D action games for Mac OS, and Jones' idea was to bring that experience to a real-time strategy game rather than another first-person game. The team agreed with Jones that their new shooter could end up as being very similar to Quake, and, after working on the project for two months, changed it to a strategy game.

Dubbed "The Giant Bloody War Game", the team's initial inspirations for Myth were films such as Mel Gibson's Braveheart, "with its close-up portrayal of bloody melees between large forces," and literature such as Glen Cook's The Black Company series, "in which gruesome tales of battle contrast with engaging and intriguing characters." Speaking of the influence of Cook, Doug Zartman, Bungie's director of public relations and one of the game's writers, claimed:

One of the things we liked was that Cook presents this pretty amoral world. One side is sort of the good guys, because the narrator is on that side, but they're not on a moral high ground over their opponents. It's not a simple good–evil dichotomy. We're dealing with a sophisticated world here, with politics and treachery and betrayal from both sides—as much conflict from within the ranks as from the enemy.

Similarly, programmer Jason Regier explained they wanted to set the game in "a dark, amoral world where opposing sides are equally brutal and their unity is torn by power struggles within the ranks. We dreamed of gameplay that combined the realism and excitement of action games with the cunning and planning required by strategy games." Zartman further stated: "we wanted to capture the feeling that you get watching large groups of people clashing on the open field. We wanted to recreate the blood-letting and grisly reality of large-scale battles." Although Myth is, by definition, a real-time strategy game, he was also eager to differentiate the game from other RTS games:

We tried real hard to come up with a term that was different from 'real-time.' We're calling it a "multimetric tactical game." 'Multimetric'—I made that word up—because it's not an isometric game in the conventional sense. There are many angles a player can have and many views the camera can take. And we're calling it 'tactical' because there are no elements of the game that focus on resources or management. It's strictly a tactical game.

Once they had decided on the basic game mechanics, their first task was to draw up a list of elements they wished to avoid; specifically, RTS clichés, obvious references to J. R. R. Tolkien's Middle-earth, allusions to the Arthurian legend, or any kind of narrative involving "little boys coming of age and saving the world." On the other hand, elements they did wish to incorporate included "ideas that contributed to the visual realism of the game," such as a 3D landscape, polygonal buildings, reflective water, particle-based weather, battlefields littered with severed limbs, and explosions that damaged the terrain permanently. They were also determined to include a robust online multiplayer mode and allow hundreds of troops to appear on a battlefield at once.

=== Cross-platform ===
Work on the game began in January 1996, with four programmers, two artists, and a product manager. Originally, the game was to have no music whatsoever, but composer Martin O'Donnell, who had recently been hired by Bungie, convinced the developers this was a bad idea, and he, Michael Salvatori and Paul Heitsch were commissioned to compose a soundtrack and work on the sound effects.

A major early decision was to develop and release the game simultaneously on both Mac OS and Microsoft Windows, which would be a first for the company. Up to this point in their history, their only venture into PC gaming had been a port of Marathon 2: Durandal. Bungie had not been happy with the port, and were determined that The Fallen Lords be a genuine cross-platform release. This meant designing the game from the ground up to be cross-platform compatible, rather than developing it for one operating system and then porting it to another. As such, 90% of the game's source code was platform independent, with 5% written for PC subroutines and 5% for Mac-specific functionality. All of the game's data, from cutscenes to the number of warriors who are left-handed, was stored in platform-independent data files called "tags", which are automatically byte-swapped when necessary and accessed via a cross-platform file manager.

As the team was more familiar with developing for Mac OS, the initial coding was done on a Mac using CodeWarrior. When PC builds were required, the team switched to Windows, using Visual C++. Ultimately, the entire game was written in C. To ensure the game looked identical on both PCs and Macs, the team created and implemented their own dialog manager and font manager, which allowed them to use custom graphics for all interface items. The font manager supported antialiased, two-byte fonts, and a variety of text-parsing formats, allowing international localizations to be completed relatively easily.

=== Programming ===
Although The Fallen Lords employs a fully 3D terrain, with 3D polygonal buildings, the characters are 2D sprites. To bring the 3D environment and the 2D characters together and construct each level, the team developed four separate programming tools; "Tag Editor" edited the constants stored in the cross-platform data files; "Extractor" handled the 2D sprites and the sequencing of their animations; "Loathing" acted as the map editor; and "Fear" dealt with the 3D polygonal models such as houses, pillars, and walls. Jason Jones explained:

Myth lies on top of a flexible file system, and every one of those little bits that goes into Myth is called a Tag. The Tag Editor lets you edit everything from the physics of the game, to the color of the units, how they move, and how they attack. There's another tool that we use to import graphics called the Extractor, and there's a third tool called Loathing. Loathing is basically the map editor for Myth. You import your map into it, you change the heights, and you place your units on the map in Loathing. The fourth tool that complements Loathing is called Fear. Fear takes care of all the models; it is used to import the 3D rendered models into Myth.

Loathing was specifically built around the Myth engine and allowed the team to modify the 3D landscape, apply lighting, determine terrain type, script the AI, and position structures, scenery, and enemies. The artists used PowerAnimator on an SGI Indigo 2 to create polygonal models and render all the characters. The 3D models were imported into the game using Fear, while the 2D sprites were cleaned up in Adobe Photoshop and imported and animated using Extractor. To create the texture maps for the terrain, the artists used Photoshop to draw the equivalent of an aerial photo, and then applied it to the 3D landscape using Loathing. Initially, the developers had planned on using fractal-generated landscapes, but they felt the randomness of such landscapes would make it difficult to design interesting levels, and so all maps were instead constructed by hand.

Implementing pathfinding was a particularly difficult challenge. The terrain in the game is a 3D polygonal mesh constructed of square cells, each of which is tessellated into two triangles. Certain cells have an associated terrain type which indicates their impassability, and may contain any solid object. The team originally planned to use the A* algorithm, but soon realized this would create problems in terms of the realism they desired. As impassable obstacles can lie anywhere on the map, and as the square cells are quite large, the obstacles are not guaranteed to be aligned at their center. Furthermore, even if an obstacle did occupy exactly one cell, the A* algorithm would make a unit walk up to the obstacle, turn, and continue around it. The developers instead wanted their units to move to avoid obstacles ahead of time, as they approached them, such as smoothly weaving through a forest instead of continually heading straight for a tree, only to stop and suddenly walk around it. As such, they wrote their own pathfinding algorithm. As the terrain in the game never changes, paths could be calculated once and remembered. Then, the team factored in arbitrarily placed obstacles and periodically refined their pathfinding using a vector-based scheme. If the planned path caused the unit to hit an obstacle, the path was altered, with the AI choosing whether deviating to the left or the right was the shorter option. Their system worked for 90% of cases, but in testing, the developers discovered several scenarios where their pathfinding algorithm didn't work especially well. However, by the time they made this discovery, it was too late to implement the changes that would have been necessary to fully correct it. As such, their assessment of the pathfinding in the final version of the game was that "it works pretty well and provides the effect we sought, but there's definitely room for improvement."

Speaking of the game's physics engine, Jason Jones said:

if you want to have an archer hit a target that's at a higher elevation and moving, you have absolutely no alternative but to solve the equation. It's not real, but it's about as real as you get, and if the arrow doesn't fly through the air right, or doesn't bounce off a tree like the gamer is expecting it to, they'll notice. There's just no good way to cheat with the physics.

By November 1996, Bungie had a demo with rudimentary gameplay in place. In an effort to create media buzz, they took the demo to several gaming magazines. Speaking in 2000, Doug Zartman explained that the physics engine was a major factor in the game even at that early stage:

There wasn't much gameplay in what we showed them—two small groups on opposite sides of a small map rushing at each other, becoming a bloody knot at the middle where they all collided and blew each other up. And the AI was crude. But the reviewers could see that it had strategic combat on real 3D terrain—something no other game at the time had, something that radically changed how the game was played; an archer could fire farther from the top of the hill than from in the valley. It was easy to demonstrate to the press that an archer on high ground was going to defeat an archer down in the valley.

=== Release ===
Writing in 1998, programmer Jason Regier stated of the game:

It doesn't take fifty people to create a major cross-platform software title. Period. Bungie Software has barely half that number of employees in the entire company, and we not only develop all our games, but publish and distribute them as well. Macintosh and PC versions of Myth, all our internal tools, and our online service were essentially developed by only six people, and everything shipped on time with no major glitches. There's no big quality assurance department here at Bungie; the public did our testing for us, and we listened to them as seriously as if they were coworkers on the project. We didn't hire any game designers, writers, or level designers to come up with our game concept and story line. Myth truly is the combined vision of our team, and each of us feels that it was our game. We came to work each day excited about the project, and we're damn proud of what we managed to create.

One of Regier's few disappointments was that during the early stages of promotion, Bungie advertised a scripting language that would allow players to modify elements of the game. As he explains: "We had hoped that user scripts could be written for extensible artificial intelligence, as well as custom formations, net game rules, and map behaviors." The team selected Java as the basis for the scripting language. Early versions of the game allowed some simple scripts to work for presentation purposes, such as instructing a unit to search the battlefield for the heads of the enemy and collect them in a pile. The programmer responsible for the scripting language left Bungie midway through production, and they were left with a number of features to implement and no library of user-friendly interfaces with the game code. Given its incomplete state at such a late stage of development, there was little choice but to drop this functionality.

=== Technology ===
The Fallen Lords originally supported both software rendering and 3dfx's Glide 3D acceleration. Shortly after the game was released, Bungie issued a v1.1 upgrade patch, which reduced the difficulty of the single-player campaign and added support for Rendition's Redline, and 3dfx's Voodoo Rush. Jason Regier wrote of working with 3D graphic accelerators:

When the project started, 3D acceleration hardware was only just starting to become popular. Nevertheless, we tried to keep hardware acceleration in mind when designing our rendering pipeline. When the opportunity arose to add hardware acceleration, the implementation worked beautifully. We worked closely with people from 3dfx and Rendition and added support for their chipsets in about a week. It's amazing how much these accelerators add to the smoothness of the terrain, the fluidity of camera movement, and the realism of the units and effects.

=== Total Codex bundle ===
In 1999, Bungie re-released The Fallen Lords for Mac OS and Windows as part of a special edition called Myth: The Total Codex. The bundle included The Fallen Lords v1.3 (Bungie's last upgrade of the game), Myth II: Soulblighter, the Soulblighter expansion pack Myth II: Chimera, and official Strategies and Secrets guides for both of the main games.

== Community ==
Although the official Bungie Myth servers closed in February 2002, the Myth series continues to have an active online fanbase. After Bungie released the Total Codex bundle in 1999, which contained The Fallen Lords v1.3, Soulblighter v1.3 and the Soulblighter expansion pack, Myth II: Chimera, they ceased working to develop the game's source code, as Microsoft, who purchased the company in 2000, wanted them to concentrate on Halo. As such, they were approached by a group of programmers, artists and coders known as MythDevelopers, who asked for access to the code so as to continue its development. With the blessing of Take-Two Interactive, who had acquired the rights to the Myth intellectual property in 2000, Bungie released their entire archive of Myth-related materials to MythDevelopers, including the source code and all artwork featured in the game. MythDevelopers were also granted access to the source code for Myth III: The Wolf Age, which was developed by MumboJumbo in 2001. Bungie also open sourced their Myth metaserver source code in 2002.

MythDevelopers used this material to improve and further develop the games. Although their initial focus was on the bug-ridden release version of The Wolf Age, they also worked to update the first two games to newer operating systems on both Mac and PC, fix bugs, and create unofficial patches to enhance both the games themselves and the mapmaking tools which Bungie had released with Soulblighter.

MythDevelopers disbanded in December 2003, with Project Magma becoming the main development group for The Fallen Lords and Soulblighter, and FlyingFlip Studios for The Wolf Age.

=== Servers ===
Prior to disbanding, MythDevelopers created and operated PlayMyth.net, the most popular online Myth server after the official servers were taken offline. Although built using the Soulblighter server, PlayMyth could also run both The Fallen Lords and The Wolf Age, which was developed by MumboJumbo using a network gameplay system designed to run on GameSpy rather than Bungie.net. PlayMyth went offline in October 2007 after it was repeatedly hacked, with the most popular servers becoming MariusNet.com and GateofStorms.net.

MariusNet had been online since just prior to Bungie.net's Myth servers going offline, and was officially approved by Bungie. The original impetus behind the project was as a temporary replacement for Myth players in case the original servers were shut down, which had been rumored for some time. The Bungie servers had not supported The Fallen Lords since November 2001, and the community believed the servers would soon close for Soulblighter as well. When The Fallen Lords servers closed in November, the only way to play a multiplayer game was via a LAN or AppleTalk, and MariusNet was created as a Bungie.net "emulator", which, like PlayMyth, supported all three Myth games, and thus gave players a way to play The Fallen Lords online. At the time, Bungie had not open sourced the metaserver source code, so creating a network for The Fallen Lords was accomplished via reverse engineering. Dave Carlile, the main programmer of the server, explained:

We started with some information about the Myth 2 network protocol, and hoped Myth 1 was the same or very similar. [Todd Snyder] then used a packet sniffer to look at the data being sent back and forth between the Myth 2 client and the server in order to learn more. We initially made a partial Myth 2 server to get the basics down, then spent hundreds of hours figuring out the differences in packet structure in Myth 1. For a few of the more difficult pieces we used a disassembler to take apart the client code, and also a debugger to trace through the code.

MariusNet closed in 2014 when the server company shut down, and the hardware was damaged whilst being moved to its new location. GateofStorms, which was created by Project Magma, and only supports Soulblighter v1.8 (released by Magma in 2013), remains active, and continues to host individual games and tournaments.

== Reception ==
Reception

Aggregate score
Aggregator	Score
Metacritic	91/100

Review scores
Publication	Score
GameRevolution	B+
GameSpot	8.9/10
Next Generation	4/5
PC Gamer (US)	90%
PC Zone	8/10

Awards
Publication	Award
PC Gamer	Real-time strategy Game of the Year (1997)
Computer Gaming World	Strategy Game of the Year (1997)
Computer Games Strategy Plus	Game of the Year (1997)
Macworld	Game of the Year (1997)

The Fallen Lords received universal acclaim upon release, and holds an aggregate score of 91 out of 100 on Metacritic, based on nine reviews. The game was seen as a defining title in the emerging real-time strategy genre, helping to solidify the elements of the genre both with gamers and in the gaming press. It also served to bring Bungie to the attention of PC gamers, and Microsoft, who would purchase the company in 2000 so that Bungie's new game, Halo, could be developed as a launch title for Microsoft's debut video game console, the Xbox.

GameSpot's Michael E. Ryan said the initial release had "an absurd level of difficulty, a poorly implemented unit-facing command, and a handful of nitpicky flaws.", which were all dealt with in the v1.1 update. He praised the plot, the different styles of gameplay, the level design, and the range of available units. He was also impressed with the graphics. He concluded "When you combine the excellent multiplayer support, the great graphics, and the dramatic gameplay improvements offered by the 1.1 patch, you get a truly remarkable real-time strategy game."

PC Zone's Jamie Cunnigham praised the interface, the range of units, the level design, multiplayer mode, and the use of the camera during battles. He also made note of the 3D physics and use of shadows. However, he was critical of the difficulty, writing "Myth is let down by what can only be described as an overwhelming frustration whenever you play it for any length of time. So much attention has been paid to the technology that some of the fun element has suffered."

Game Revolution's Calvin Hubble called it "one of the most impressive looking strategy games to hit the market." He also lauded the online multiplayer mode. However, he was critical of the difficulty level, finding the game too hard on even its easiest setting. He concluded "After beating the first couple of levels, the enjoyment could quickly turn to nausea as try after try fails to pass one single level. The graphics and realism are breathtaking, if only the single player game wasn't so difficult."

Next Generation reviewed the PC version of the game, and stated that "With a large and complex control scheme, Myth's learning curve starts higher than anything else on the market. Yet, for the kind of players who paint their own miniatures and build sets, it's a challenge of fabled proportions."

GamePro commented that the game "simply does everything right", particularly mentioning the extensive gore, the ability to save and replay battles at varying speeds and from different angles, the crisp sound effects, and the networked multiplayer contests. They remarked that the game is immediately accessible, with only the camera requiring any time to learn, and gave it a perfect 5.0 out of 5 in all four categories (graphics, sound, control, and fun factor), concluding that "today's bloated real-time strategy market could use a swift kick, and Myth: The Fallen Lords is one big-ass boot."

=== Sales and awards ===
According to Alex Seropian, co-founder of Bungie, The Fallen Lords cost roughly $2 million to develop and market, by far Bungie's most expensive game up to that time. As a result, they needed it to be financially successful, especially given that it was their first original PC game. The game did prove a commercial success, selling over 350,000 units worldwide, yielding a $14 million profit, and becoming Bungie's most successful game thus far. In the United States, the game sold 40,617 copies during 1997. By 2000, the game had over 100,000 people registered with online accounts at Bungie.net. The success of the game also helped Bungie rank #101 in Inc.'s 1998 list of the 500 fastest growing private corporations in North America. Primarily due to the success of The Fallen Lords, Bungie's profits had increased by 2,228% from 1993 to 1997.

The game also won numerous awards, including "Real-Time Strategy Game of the Year" from PC Gamer, "Strategy Game of the Year" from Computer Gaming World, and "Game of the Year" from both Computer Games Strategy Plus and Macworld. Online Game Review named it one of the fifty greatest games ever made. In 2012, The Fallen Lords was listed on Time's All-TIME 100 greatest video games list.

In 1998, PC Gamer declared it the 19th-best computer game ever released, and the editors called it "a breath of fresh air" and "a modern classic". In 2003, The Fallen Lords was inducted into GameSpot's list of the greatest games of all time.
