= Myth III: The Wolf Age =

2001 video game

- Developer: MumboJumbo
- Publishers: Take-Two Interactive; Gathering of Developers (PC); MacSoft (Mac)
- Producer: Scott Campbell
- Designer: Scott Campbell
- Programmer: Andrew Meggs
- Artist: Jay Kootar
- Composer: Zak Belica
- Series: Myth
- Platforms: Windows, Mac OS
- Release: Windows: NA: October 31, 2001; EU: November 2, 2001; Mac OS: NA: January 7, 2002
- Genre: Real-time tactics
- Modes: Single-player, multiplayer

Myth III: The Wolf Age is a 2001 real-time tactics video game developed by MumboJumbo and co-published by Take-Two Interactive and Gathering of Developers for Windows and by Take-Two and MacSoft for Mac OS. The Wolf Age is the third game in the Myth series, following 1997's Myth: The Fallen Lords and 1998's Myth II: Soulblighter, both of which were developed by Bungie. In 1999, Take-Two purchased 19.9% of Bungie's shares, but when Microsoft bought Bungie outright in 2000, the rights for Oni and the Myth series were transferred to Take-Two, who hired the startup company MumboJumbo to develop Myth III.

The Wolf Age is a prequel to the two previous games, and is set one-thousand years prior to the events depicted in The Fallen Lords. It tells the story of Connacht's attempts to rid the land of the flesh eating monsters known as the Myrkridia, and defeat the immortal evil spirit "The Leveler", who has inhabited the body of the hero who defeated him in a previous age, Tireces. Now known as Moagim, The Leveler is determined to wipe out humanity. The plot of the game serves as an origin story for many of the main antagonists from The Fallen Lords and Soulblighter, and depicts the original forms and relationships of characters such as Balor, Soulblighter, Shiver, The Deceiver, The Watcher, and "The Head".

The game received generally positive reviews, although it was considered inferior to the two previous games. Critics praised the storyline, graphics, single-player campaign and general gameplay. Major points of criticism included the many bugs in the Windows version, awkward controls, and a poor online multiplayer mode. Many critics found the game was rushed to release, with several speculating that MumboJumbo had not been given enough time to complete it satisfactorily. Shortly after the game was released, the entire development team was let go by MumboJumbo, and no further technical support or patches were provided by either MumboJumbo or Take-Two.

The Myth series as a whole, and Soulblighter in particular, supported an active online community for over a decade after the official servers went offline. The first formally organized group of volunteer-programmers was MythDevelopers, who were granted access to the game's source code by Take-Two. MythDevelopers initially formed with the purpose of fixing the bug-ridden Windows version of The Wolf Age when it became apparent there would be no official support for the game. The most recently active Myth development group is Project Magma, an offshoot of MythDevelopers. These groups have worked to provide ongoing support for the games, update them to newer operating systems, fix bugs, release unofficial patches, create mods, and maintain online servers for multiplayer gaming.

== Gameplay ==
Myth III: The Wolf Age is a real-time tactics game, and as such, unlike the gameplay in real-time strategy games, the player does not have to engage in resource micromanagement or economic macromanagement, does not have to construct a base or buildings, and does not have to gradually build up their army by acquiring resources and researching new technologies. Instead, each level begins with the player's army already assembled and ready for combat. During the game, the player controls forces of various sizes made up of a number of different units, each possessing their own strengths and weaknesses. In single-player mode, only Light units are playable, but in online multiplayer mode, the player can control both Light and Dark units.

Basic gameplay involves the player selecting and commanding units. To select an individual unit, the player clicks on that unit. Once selected, the unit is surrounded by a yellow rectangle, beside which is a health meter, which diminishes as the unit takes damage. Units capable of utilising magic also have a mana meter in addition to their health meter. As they use magic, this meter diminishes, and then slowly regenerates over time. Units do not regenerate health, however, and there is no way to construct new units (although in some single-player missions, reinforcements are automatically received at predetermined points). To select all nearby units of a given type, the player double-clicks on any individual unit of that type. To select multiple units of different types, the player can either "shift click" (hold down the shift key and click on each individual unit) or use "band-selection" (click and hold the mouse button on a piece of ground, then drag the cursor across the screen. This causes a yellow box to appear, which grows and shrinks as it follows the cursor's movement. When the player releases the button, any units within the box are selected). The player can instantly select all units on screen, irrespective of type, by pressing the enter key. The player can also assign manually selected unit groupings to a specific key on the keyboard, and when that key is pressed, it instantly selects the desired group of units. The HUD also includes a "Unit Grouping Bar" which allows the player to click on the corresponding number rather than using the keyboard to select their group.

Once one or more units have been selected, the player can click on the ground to make them walk to the selected spot, or click on an enemy to make them attack. Units with projectile weapons, such as archers and dwarves can also be ordered to attack a specific spot on the ground, rather than an enemy. It is also important that the player have their units facing in the right direction. This is accomplished by pressing the left or the right arrow key or moving the mouse to rotate the direction of the units as they move to the selected location. Facing the correct direction is especially important when using formations, of which there are ten available. After selecting a group of units, the player must press the corresponding formation button on the keyboard, and then click on the ground where they want the units to form. The player can also order all selected units to scatter and to retreat. All formations, as well as commands such as stopping, guarding, scattering, retreating, reversing direction, and certain multiplayer only commands, are also available via a single click in the Control Bar at the bottom of the screen.

When a single unit is selected, information about that unit appears in the "Status Bar" at the top of the HUD; the unit's name, a brief biography, how many kills he has, how many battles he has survived, and (if he is capable of carrying items) his inventory. When multiple units are selected, the names, types, and quantity of units will appear, but there will be no biography or information on their kills or previous battles. If no units are selected, the Status Bar provides details of the current mission. The HUD also features a transparent overhead mini-map, which displays information about the current battlefield; the player's field of vision is indicated by a yellow trapezoid, enemy units appear as red dots, friendly non-playable units as blue dots, and the player's army as green dots. The player can click anywhere on the mini-map to instantly jump to that location. The mini-map does not initially display the entire battlefield; the player must explore the area for it to become fully mapped.

The player has full control over the camera throughout the game, and can move it backwards and forwards, left and right, orbit left and right (keeps the camera focused on a single spot while making a 360 degree circle around that spot), rotate left and right (the camera remains in the same spot but the player's point of view moves from side to side), and zoom in and out. All movements can be carried out via the keyboard and mouse. Using the mouse to move backwards, forwards, left and right is accomplished by moving the cursor to the top, bottom, left or right of the screen, respectively. The player can also select preferences to allow them to control rotation and orbiting via the mouse, by moving the cursor to the top and bottom corners of the screen, respectively. Zooming can be controlled by either the keyboard or mouse wheel.

As in the first two games, selecting and commanding units forms the basic gameplay of The Wolf Age. The battles are more complex than simply commanding units to attack the enemy, with strategy and awareness of the conditions of the battlefield, and even the weather, also playing important roles. For example, due to the game's physics engine, objects react with one another, with units, and with the terrain. This can manifest itself simply in a severed head bouncing off one of the player's units and changing direction, although it can also have more serious consequences. For example, a dwarf could throw a molotov cocktail at an enemy on a hillside and miss, with the projectile rolling back down the hill towards the player's own units. Projectiles in general, both those used by the player and the enemy, have no guarantee of hitting anything; they are merely propelled in the direction instructed by the physics engine. Arrows, for example, may miss their intended target due to a small degree of simulated aiming error that becomes more significant at long range, or the target may move out of the way, or behind a tree or building. If archers are firing at enemies who are engaged in melee combat, they may also hit the player's own units instead of the enemy, causing the same amount of damage. This is also true of dwarfs' molotov cocktails. As such, friendly fire is an important aspect of the game. The weather is also something the player must always bear in mind. For example, rain or snow can put out explosive-based attacks, and strong wind can cause archers problems in hitting their targets. It is also much easier for projectile units to hit enemies below them rather than above them, and as such, positioning of the player's units is an important aspect of the game.

=== Single-player ===
In the single-player campaign, the player starts each mission with a group of soldiers, and must use that group to accomplish a specific goal or set of goals. These goals can involve killing a certain number of enemies, defending a location, reaching a certain point on the map, or destroying a specific object or enemy. The focus of the single-player campaign is on a smaller force defeating a much larger enemy force; in every mission, the Light units are outnumbered by enemies, often vastly, and so the player must use the terrain, employ the specific skills of their individual units, and gradually decrease the enemy force, or attempt to avoid it altogether. Units in the single-player campaign acquire experience with each kill. Experience increases attack rate, accuracy, and defence, and any unit that survives a battle will carry over to the next battle with their accumulated experience (assuming the next battle features units of that type). New to the single-player campaign in The Wolf Age is a "morale boost" for normal units when fighting alongside "Champion" units; any normal unit who is engaged in combat whilst in the close proximity of a Champion unit will gain experience at a faster rate than normal.

=== Multiplayer ===
When it was released, The Wolf Age could be used for multiplayer gaming on GameSpy, or via a LAN on PC or AppleTalk on Mac. In multiplayer, the player starts with an army, and can customize it by trading units with other players, using point values that approximate the value of the units being traded.

Multiplayer games include "Body Count" (team deathmatch), "Steal The Bacon" (somewhere on the battlefield is a ball; the object is to get the ball and keep it away from the opponents, with the winner being the last team to touch the ball), "Last Man On The Hill" (a hill on the map is marked with a flag; whichever player owns the hill when time runs out is the winner), "Scavenger Hunt" (a number of balls are on the battlefield, with the winner being the first player to touch them all), "Flag Rally" (a number of flags are on the battlefield, with the winner being the first player to touch them all), "Capture the flag" (each team begins the game with one flag, with the winner being the first team to capture the other team's flag), "Balls On Parade" (each team has a ball; with the winner being the first team to capture the other team's ball), "Territories" (a number of flags are on the battlefield, with the winner being the team to capture and hold the most flags), "Captures" (a number of balls are on the battlefield, with the winner being the team who is in possession of the most balls at the end of the match), "King Of The Hill" (a hill on the map is marked with a flag, with the hill captured when one or more of a team's units move within a certain range of the flag and eliminate any enemy units in the same area; the winner is the team who controls the hill for the longest amount of time), "Stampede!" (each team starts with a herd of animals and a number of flags; the object is to shepherd the herd to the enemy flags, with each successfully herded animal earning the team one point. The winner is the team with the most points at the end of the game), "Assassin" (each team has a "target unit", with the winner being the team who kills the opponents' target first), "Hunting" (each team must kill as much wildlife as possible; each animal has a point value, and the winner is the team with the most points at the end of the game), and "Assault" (the game begins with one team defending a flag, and the other team attacking. After a set period of time, the teams switch. The assaulting team scores a point if they touch the flag, the defending team score a point if they prevent the flag being touched. The winner is the team with the most points after both teams have attacked and defended).

== Story ==
=== History ===
Many thousands of years since humanity first evolved in the world of Myth, scholars looking back through its history began to notice a pattern; civilisation would rise, only to be torn down, before again rising. More specifically, they noticed that every thousand years, a powerful being bent only on destruction would conquer humanity, ushering in an age of darkness. This age of darkness would itself last a thousand years, until a hero emerged to lead humanity into an age of light. For a thousand years, humanity would prosper, only to be conquered once again, leading to another thousand years of darkness, and so on. The commencement of each thousand-year cycle is marked by the appearance of a comet in the western skies, "The Apparitor". Believing each evil being to be the same entity in different guises, scholars called him "The Leveler". They noted that each time The Leveler returned, he was more powerful than before, and feared that eventually he would be unstoppable. When Sorangath assumed the mantle of The Leveler, many felt this was the final phase of the cycle. However, Sorangath was defeated by Tireces, and once again, humanity prospered.

After Sorangath's defeat came the Age of Reason, during which a warlord named Clovis of the Bruig united most of humanity under one banner; the Cath Bruig Empire. In the capital city of Llancarfan, the archmage Mazzarin founded a school for sorcerers, the most skilled of whom became known as Avatara. During this period, the Avatara occasionally came into conflict with a powerful necromancer known as Bahl'al, who appeared briefly throughout human history, before vanishing again for centuries. This tendency earned him the name "The Watcher".

A thousand years after the death of Sorangath, The Apparitor appeared, heralding the return of The Leveler. Inhabiting the long dead body of Tireces, and assuming all his knowledge, The Leveler became known as Moagim. Despite this, humanity had grown strong, and Moagim knew defeat was imminent. Using black magic, he opened a door into another realm, and found a race of fearless monsters known as Myrkridia. Shortly thereafter, he was captured by the Avatara, and drawn and quartered, but he had already brought the Myrkridia into the world. Humanity were unprepared for such a vicious foe, and was hunted to near extinction. Only Llancarfan remained of the Cath Bruig Empire. In the mountainous lands of Gower, refugees from other parts of the world banded together for survival. One thousand years since the Myrkridia appeared, they remain undefeated in battle, and their numbers continue to grow. Meanwhile, a necromancer calling himself Moagim Reborn has emerged. In the western skies, The Apparitor heralds the coming of a new hero.

=== Plot ===
The game begins one-thousand years prior to The Fallen Lords. Only two human strongholds remain; Gower and Llancarfan. Unable to penetrate Llancarfan, the Myrkridia have instead focused on Gower, reaching the largest township, Yürsgrad. The town is successfully defended by a group under the command of Connacht, a man raised in the wild after the Myrkrida destroyed his village and killed his family, and who has spent his life studying them and learning their weaknesses. Over the next four years, the various clans unite behind Connacht, who goes on the offensive, pushing the Myrkridia back into the Dire Marsh.

Word of Connacht's deeds reach Llancarfan, and he is summoned to meet Emperor Leitrim, who wishes him to join the fight against Moagim Reborn. On the way, he saves the life of Damas, captain of the Emperor's Royal Guard, and the two become friends. In Llancarfan, Leitrim asks Connacht to teach the men how to defeat the Myrkridia, and Connacht agrees, much to the consternation of Leitrim's advisor, the archmage Mjarin, who takes an instant dislike to him. The training is conducted under the watch of Myrdred, a young Avatara. After several months, the soldiers are tasked with finding and killing a Myrkridian Pack-Mage. They do so, finding a book in the Pack-Mage's den revealing Moagim is planning to launch an attack on Llancarfan. However, the book also notes the location of his camp, and Connacht launches a preemptive strike. The army walk into a trap; Moagim has enlisted the aid of Bahl'al, who unleashes an army of undead, and the Trow, ancient giants nearly unstoppable in combat, who also bring with them their Oghre slaves.

The army is decimated, leaving a demoralized Connacht planning to return to Gower, but is prevented by Damas and Myrdred, who suggests they find Mazzarin. Legend claims Bahl'al killed Mazzarin centuries ago, but Myrdred believes him to be still living. The trio set out to find him, accompanied by Ravanna, a Myrmidon warrior. Entering his crypt, Mazzarin is initially uninterested in helping them. Impressed by Connacht, he transfers his knowledge of the Total Codex, a book that tells of future events, into Connacht's mind. In Llancarfan, Connacht speaks to the dwarven Smiths of Muirthemne about creating a magical device that could imprison infinite enemies. Forgemaster Traval says they can make it, but they need their tome of building from Myrgard, which is currently under siege by Ghôls. Connacht leads an army to lift the siege, annihilating the Ghôls. The Dwarves form an alliance with humanity, and give Connacht the tome. In Llancarfan, the Smiths build Connacht a Tain; a small magical device containing a pocket universe of limitless capacity, capable of sweeping an infinite number of enemies inside it. With the Tain in hand, Connacht and a small contingent of men head to the Dire Marsh, and wipe out the Myrkirida.

Moagim then attacks Llancarfen with an army of undead and Trow. The army is repelled, but it is agreed that with the Trow by his side, Moagim could return and breach the city. As such, Connacht proposes they be removed from the war; Myrdred has learned the Oghre are not enslaved by physical means, but by a "Dream of Subjugation", and believes if the spell can be broken, the Oghre will rebel, and the Trow will withdraw from the war to deal with the uprising. Myrdred leads a small force to the Trow Empire, where he is able to free the Oghre, beginning a rebellion against the Trow, who withdraw from the war.

Two years pass. Moagim makes no attempt to attack Llancarfan, but continues to conquer lands outside the city. When news arrives that the Twelve Duns, home of the Myrmidon, has fallen, Ravanna, who is in love with Damas, heads there, saving thousands of refugees, and forging an alliance between the Duns and the city. Meanwhile, Connacht receives word from the Smiths that a device he commissioned from them is ready, the SunHammer. When he reaches the forge, he finds it under attack by the Spider Cult, a group who worship Syrkrosh, a giant spider from another dimension. Finding the Cult has stolen the Tain and the SunHammer, Connacht readies his forces to attack, but before he can do so, the Smiths infiltrate the cultists' temple. They wipe out the Cult, retrieve the artifacts and imprison Syrkrosh within the Tain. When Connacht attacks, he finds a note from Traval explaining Syrkrosh came into the world by way of an accident during the construction of the Tain, so the Smiths felt honor-bound to defeat her, following her inside the Tain to kill her.

Meanwhile, the Trow put down the Oghre rebellion, and vow to attack Llancarfan. On the way to intercept them, Connacht's forces are ambushed by Bahl'al, and although they survive, Connacht knows someone has betrayed them. Eventually, they destroy the Trow Empire, Connacht using the SunHammer to melt their cities and trap them within the molten iron. Upon returning to Llancarfan, Connacht prepares the army to destroy Moagim. Before they leave, however, Leitrim asks Connacht to let him command the attack. Despite his misgivings, and under pressure from Mjarin, Connacht agrees. En route, they are attacked by Bahl'al, but Myrdred, who seems to have grown unnaturally skilled, defeats him in a dream duel. Meanwhile, Moagim heads west, planning to cross the Cloudspine Mountains into The Province. With both sides camped in the Cloudspine, Moagim sneaks into the Llancarfan camp and kills Leitrim. Connacht and Damas then lead an assault into Moagim's camp, with Connacht killing Moagim, and his armies of undead collapsing thereafter.

However, as they return from the battle, Connacht realizes Mjarin is the real Leveler; he resurrected Moagim to cover his own machinations. Connacht also learns Myrdred is in the service of Mjarin. Connacht and his men fight their way to Mjarin, with Connacht killing him. The head, however, refuses to die, and so is buried. Myrdred is banished and renamed The Deceiver, whilst Bahl'al is hunted down, and imprisoned beneath the Cloudspine. Connacht becomes Emperor of Llancarfan, which he renames Muirthemne in honour of the dwarven smiths. Years later, Connacht tells Damas to destroy what artifacts of power he can and hide the indestructible ones, explaining that from his knowledge of the Total Codex, he knows he will become the next Leveler, and does not want to have access to any of these items. Connacht presides over a prosperous era known as the Wolf Age, before disappearing into the east, not to be seen again for a thousand years when he would return as Balor, with Damas and Ravanna again by his side as Soulblighter and Shiver.

== Development ==
=== Franchise ===
In 1999, Bungie, who had developed the first two games in the Myth series (Myth: The Fallen Lords and Myth II: Soulblighter), sold 19.9% of their shares to Take-Two Interactive. In June 2000, Bungie was purchased outright by Microsoft, with Take-Two acquiring the Oni and Myth intellectual properties. The Wolf Age was then announced in January 2001, when Take-Two subsidiary Gathering of Developers revealed MumboJumbo were developing it for Microsoft Windows and Mac OS.

The Wolf Age would be MumboJumbo's first game, but how they came to be working on the title was somewhat unusual. The original successful pitch for the game had been made by Scott Campbell, CEO of Contraband Entertainment, the company which had handled the Mac OS ports of Ritual Entertainment's SiN and Heavy Metal: F.A.K.K.². However, although Take-Two were impressed with Campbell's pitch, which had beat out four other proposals, they were worried about turning the game over to a team who had yet to develop a major in-house title. Ritual had been planning to open an office in Irvine, California near Contraband's headquarters for some time, and as Ritual had a history with Contraband, Take-Two suggested Contraband team up with some more experienced members of Ritual to form a new company - MumboJumbo - which would handle development of Myth III.

Upon GOD's announcement, Alex Seropian, co-founder of Bungie, expressed confidence in MumboJumbo's ability to create a worthy successor to the original games, stating that "MumboJumbo has a real appreciation for what made the first two Myth games great. We're confident that their knowledge and experience will make Myth III a title that satisfies existing Myth fans and brings legions of new gamers into the fold". Also addressing the issue of remaining faithful to the two previous games whilst still introducing new elements to the franchise, MumboJumbo president Mark Dochtermann explained the idea with The Wolf Age was not to reinvent the series' basic gameplay, which the developers felt was still capable of supporting a unique title. At the same time, they were also keen to try out new things: "There's a lot left to explore in the Myth franchise even before we go in a somewhat different route. Although, we are taking a [new] route in terms of adding 3D acceleration, 3D models, and doing stuff with the terrain engine and physics that are still way beyond what the other RTS games are doing right now". Similarly, producer and lead designer Scott Campbell stated:

The Myth games were way ahead of their time, technically. What they were lacking in was graphics. We plan to completely overhaul the graphics engine to incorporate fully 3D units, 16-bit terrain maps with high-resolution detail textures, true 3D flora that deforms with wind and Wight blasts and more! We intend to pay respect to Myth and its fans. We don't care to change the whole appeal of the game just so we can call it ours.

With this in mind, MumboJumbo hired three members of Soulblighter's modding community to work on the game, as they were so familiar with Soulblighter's source code, upon which The Wolf Age was being built, and the Myth franchise in general. Although initially hired to work on the technical aspects of the game, such as level design, the members of the community soon became invaluable to MumboJumbo in terms of writing the storyline. Executive producer Mike Donges explained: "The existing Myth community is still very rabid about the games. We want to make sure that we catered to them, so to do that, we had some people from the Myth mod community. They're our Myth lore experts, so if we try to put in something new, they have the ability to [reject it]".

=== Technology ===
Screenshot of Myth III showing the 3D character models in a 3D terrain. The previous games in the series utilized a 3D terrain, but had used 2D sprites rather than fully 3D units.

Although The Wolf Age was built using Soulblighter's source code, the developers made significant changes to improve the game's visual aesthetics. Mike Donges explains: "We started off with the Myth II engine, but we gutted almost everything out of it except for the AI. And the graphical engine is completely redone". The single biggest change made to the game engine was that everything in The Wolf Age is rendered in OpenGL 3D, including the characters and all environmental objects; unlike the previous games, The Wolf Age did not include a software rendering option. It was the first Myth game to feature fully 3D characters; the previous games had featured a 3D environment, but the characters and some environmental objects were 2D sprites. In The Wolf Age, each 3D character is composed of 512x512 textures, with human sized units made up of between 350 and 450 polygons, whilst the Trow are made up of almost 1000, with the engine capable of supporting up to 10,000 polygons on-screen at any one time. All units have at least thirteen different animations. The characters were animated using Ritual's "Tiki" character-animation system, a skeletal animation system used on Heavy Metal: F.A.K.K.² and later used by Rogue Entertainment for American McGee's Alice.

Of the move to full 3D, Dochtermann points out the 3D engine allows for things not possible in the previous Myth games: "There's some very cool kinematics stuff. So when you have explosions, and when your units move through the world, the trees will respond. And not just blowing them up. You'll see the shock waves from explosions, and you're affecting the environment a lot more. It's a lot more realistic". Speaking of how the move to 3D would help the game improve on the previous Myth games, Campbell said:

Do you remember in Myth II when you take the camera and zoom all the way up on the terrain, how it gets all pixely and kind of ugly? Imagine having the same-size color terrain maps, except instead of having one 8-bit palette map, we're now going to a true 16-bit-color terrain map. And what's more is that we're having high-resolution detail textures overlaid on the color map. So that when you zoom in really close, you'll actually start to see little blades of grass, tiny little rocks, or ripples in mud.

The new game engine also supported real-time shadows and dynamic lighting, as well as being capable of blending six to seven different texture layers, depending on how close the camera is to the action.

Regarding the programming tools used to create the game, MumboJumbo initially began by using Bungie's "Fear" and "Loathing" tools, which had been made available to the public with the release of Soulblighter, although they never intended to use them for very long, with the plan always being to develop their own tool. Speaking a few months into development, Campbell described:

We are planning on doing a merger of the tools later on, something that will be used specifically for Myth III and something that is far more robust and actually cross-platform compatible. We're actually making tools right now that we will be using for Myth III that are not only cross-platform compatible, but will also allow you to do all the neat new things, use all the new scripting commands and the new models and 3D units and stuff that we're using in this game.

This new tool was eventually called "Vengeance". At the E3 event in May 2001, MumboJumbo promised that Vengeance would ship with the game.

=== Music ===
Composer Zak Bellica originally wanted to hire an entire Eastern European orchestra with whom to record the score for the game. The budget limitations made this impossible, as did the decision to make the music less "soaring" and more "primitive". Ultimately, Bellica hired only one musician, cellist Lori Goldston; the rest of the score was created using instruments from sample libraries, which were then played back on a digital sampler. Due to the time constraints, Bellica had to compose the score without any access to footage from the game; all he had to go on was the script, and notes from Scott Campbell. Bellica would compose a piece of music for a specific part of the game and then send it to the developers, who would send it back to him with notes on what they wanted him to change.

=== Release and problems ===
The Wolf Age went gold on October 17, 2001, completing a development cycle of only ten months, a relatively fast time to develop a major video game. Speaking half-way through development, Campbell said about the accelerated development of the game:

The cool thing about using the Myth II engine from day one is that we already had a solution for how we were going to make levels. We had the level designers immediately start cranking out levels. Because we had Tiki, and access to that, our modelers immediately started making 3D Studio Max models. Because we had all of these key components in place starting out, we were able to start asset production, and that's how I think we'll be able to ship a literally one-year project.

Soon before the game's release, PC Gamer's Jim Preston wrote that he was skeptical as to whether the developer had been given enough time to satisfactorily complete the game. The PC version of the game was released to stores on October 31, 2001. On November 16, lead programmer Andrew Meggs posted on Mythvillage.org that the entire Myth III PC team had been laid off by MumboJumbo the same day the game had been released. In a post titled "Some ugly, but honest truths", Meggs wrote:

The basic reason was that there was no next project lined up and funded, nor was there expected to be in the near future, it's expensive to keep a team of salaried people around doing nothing, and MumboJumbo was not a huge business with infinitely deep pockets. There's a tangled web between the MumboJumbo Irvine project team, its parent company United Developers and the game's publisher Take-Two. I wouldn't blame anyone specifically for the collapse - call it everybody's fault if you're the angry sort or nobody's fault if you're charitable.

Meggs explained the team knew there were problems with the Windows version of the game, but, as they had been fired, they were unable to address these problems. He stated they had been working on a patch to fix some of these problems when they were let go, and he was unsure if this patch would be released. He also acknowledged that many of the criticisms regarding bugs in the game would have been addressed by the patch. Speaking of the Mac version, he explained all of the fixes included in the patch for the PC version had been implemented in the Mac release version, but there were now only two people working on the game, and the release date was unknown. Later that same day, Rebecca Heineman, one of the two people still working on the Mac version, posted to the forums: "Don't be concerned about the Mac version. Chris Jacobson and I are hard at work fixing the last issues. Expect the game to be released soon". Meggs also addressed MumboJumbo's failure to release Vengeance with the game:

Vengeance is still missing a number of key functions that are only present in a specially modified version of Loathing. Somebody is working on that from home. Hopefully there'll be a release in the very immediate future with the goal of just getting the features it has right now out to the public, and then a final release when it's got all the features it's going to get. The Myth community has shown a great ability to create quality tools in the past and I would love to see the full source code to our tools made available as a foundation for continued work by the community, but that may not be possible due to legal constraints.

The same day Meggs made his post, November 16, MumboJumbo closed their offices in Irvine, with a view to consolidate their resources in their Dallas headquarters. Three days later, MumboJumbo denied the Myth III team had been laid off, saying all staff members had been invited to work in the Dallas office. They also announced the patch Meggs had spoken of would be released within the week. On December 19, Mark Dochtermann promised the patch would be released before Christmas, along with Vengeance, saying they had delayed release of the patch for the PC version so as to coincide its release with the Mac version of the game. Although the Mac version was ultimately released in January 2002, the patch was never officially released by MumboJumbo for either version of the game.

== Community ==
When it became apparent that The Wolf Age would receive little to no technical support or official patches from either MumboJumbo or Take-Two, a group of programmers, artists and coders banded together under the name MythDevelopers, and approached Take-Two to ask for access to the game's source code so as to continue its development. To the surprise of many in the industry, Take-Two not only granted MythDevelopers access to The Wolf Age's code, they also authorized Bungie to make available the source code for the first two games.

Although MythDevelopers worked to update The Fallen Lords and Soulblighter to newer operating systems on both Mac and PC, fix bugs, and create unofficial patches to enhance both the games themselves and the mapmaking tools, their initial focus was on the bug-ridden release versions of The Wolf Age, which had problems running on both Windows XP and OS X. Upon getting the code for The Wolf Age, they discovered they "couldn't even build a usable app. We had to rewrite the Mac input routines before we could even make an app". They were also given access to the source code for "BurgerLib", a proprietary development library created by Rebecca Heineman, lead developer on the Mac version of the game. Additionally, they developed their own library, dubbed the Myth Core Library, which provided networking, input routines, and other low-level functions. This enabled MythDevelopers to avoid the necessity of licensing any external libraries, and instead allowed them to develop everything in-house. This was part of their deal with Take-Two, as they couldn't incorporate anything into the games which they would be unable to give Take-Two the rights to should the company ever ask for the source code back; all modifications remained the intellectual property of Take-Two, who were free to use them in a future commercial version of Myth, if they ever wanted to re-release an upgraded version of one or more of the games, or incorporate the modifications into the development of a new Myth game.

In April 2003, MythDevelopers released a v1.1 patch for The Wolf Age for both Windows and Mac. Fixing over forty gameplay and stability issues, and addressing numerous bugs, the patch also included new multiplayer maps and gameplay modes. MythDevelopers disbanded in December 2003, with Project Magma becoming the main development group for The Fallen Lords and Soulblighter, and FlyingFlip Studios for The Wolf Age. The final patch for The Wolf Age was v1.3, released in 2004, which introduced multiple gameplay and stability improvements, as well as bug fixes, and performance enhancements. Released in conjunction with v1.3 was "Ballistic", a mapmaking tool designed to supersede the Vengeance program created by MumboJumbo. Designed for both Mac and PC, Ballistic allowed the user more choices than had Vengeance, was more user-friendly, and was without any of the bugs inherent to Vengeance. FlyingFlip disbanded in 2007.

=== Servers ===
Prior to disbanding, MythDevelopers created and operated PlayMyth.net, the most popular online Myth server after the official servers were taken offline. Although built using the Soulblighter server, PlayMyth could also run both The Fallen Lords and The Wolf Age, which was developed by MumboJumbo using a network gameplay system designed to run on GameSpy rather than Bungie.net. PlayMyth went offline in October 2007 after it was repeatedly hacked, with the most popular servers becoming MariusNet.com and GateofStorms.net.

MariusNet had been online since just prior to Bungie.net's Myth servers going offline, and was officially approved by Bungie. The original impetus behind the project was as a temporary replacement for Myth players in case the original servers were shut down, which had been rumored for some time. The Bungie servers had not supported The Fallen Lords since November 2001, and the community believed the servers would soon close for Soulblighter as well. When The Fallen Lords servers closed in November, the only way to play a multiplayer game was via a LAN or AppleTalk, and MariusNet was created as a Bungie.net "emulator", which, like PlayMyth, supported all three Myth games, and thus gave players a way to play The Wolf Age online. At the time, Bungie had not open sourced the metaserver source code, so creating a network for The Fallen Lords was accomplished via reverse engineering. Dave Carlile, the main programmer of the server, explained:

We started with some information about the Myth 2 network protocol, and hoped Myth was the same or very similar. [Todd Snyder] then used a packet sniffer to look at the data being sent back and forth between the Myth 2 client and the server in order to learn more. We initially made a partial Myth 2 server to get the basics down, then spent hundreds of hours figuring out the differences in packet structure in Myth. For a few of the more difficult pieces we used a disassembler to take apart the client code, and also a debugger to trace through the code.

MariusNet closed in 2014 when the server company shut down, and the hardware was damaged whilst being moved to its new location. GateofStorms, which was created by Project Magma, and only supports Soulblighter v1.8, remains active, and continues to host individual games and tournaments.

== Reception ==
Reception

Aggregate score
Aggregator	Score
Metacritic	76/100

Review scores
Publication	Score
GameSpot	8.4/10
GameSpy	75/100
IGN	8.7/10
PC Gamer (US)	58%
PC Zone	7/10

Although Myth III received generally positive reviews, it was viewed as inferior to both of the previous Myth games. It holds an aggregate score of 76 out of 100 on Metacritic, based on twelve reviews. It was a runner-up for The Electric Playground's 2001 "Best Strategy Game for PC" prize, but lost to Etherlords.

IGN's Dan Adams scored the game 8.7 out of 10, giving it an "Editors' Choice" award. He was impressed with the story and the 3D graphics, and praised MumboJumbo for retaining the core gameplay elements whilst also making improvements. He concluded: "Some unfortunate set backs, whether they were by design or bug dulled the experience a little bit, but not enough to hamper my enjoyment. Fans of the series shouldn't be disappointed by MumboJumbo's effort to follow in the mighty footsteps that Bungie left behind".

GameSpot's Sam Parker scored it 8.4 out of 10: "Myth III's single-player game represents the best the Myth series has to offer". He praised the 3D graphics and the storyline, lauding the decision to make a prequel, but was critical of the absence of many advertised multiplayer features, the absence of Vengeance, and compatibility issues with Windows XP, expressing concern as to whether MumboJumbo and Take-Two would provide the same level of technical support that Bungie had for the first two games. He concluded: "Myth III isn't as well polished a game as its predecessors, but its strong single-player element and solid graphics make it a remarkable game in its own right".

GameSpy's William Abner scored it 75 out of 100, writing that the game "isn't a complete product. It's close. And parts of it are just as fun, if not more so, than the earlier games, but a laundry list of bugs, hardware glitches, and severe multiplayer issues keep the game from reaching its potential". He praised the single-player campaign and the storyline. On negative side, he cited numerous bugs, including no support for Windows 95, despite the box claiming otherwise, and compatibility issues with Windows XP. He was also critical of the absence of Vengeance, despite the box stating it was included, and the fact that multiplayer mode had only five maps and no TCP/IP support. He concluded: "If you need your new Myth fix and can't wait for a patch, then the best option is to buy the game from a store that accepts returns in case the game doesn't like your particular system setup. If you can play it, focus your efforts on the campaign - it's fun, and for the most part works as advertised. Hopefully, by the time you are finished with Connacht's tale, a patch to fix the many multiplayer issues will be ready".

PC Zone's Keith Pullin scored it 7 out 10. He praised the gameplay, the importance of tactics during combat and the graphics, but criticized the repetitiveness of the single-player campaign, concluding: "While this third instalment of the series boasts some commendable touches, it rarely manages to fully explode into rip-roaring RTS action. Myth III seems to coast along without ever really breaking sweat".
