= Myth (video game series) =

- Series logo
- Genre: Real-time tactics
- Developers: Bungie (Myth, Myth II); MumboJumbo (Myth III)
- Publishers: NA: Bungie (Myth, Myth II); EU: Eidos Interactive (Myth); EU: GT Interactive (Myth II); WW: Take-Two Interactive (Myth III)
- Creator: Jason Jones
- Platforms: Windows, Mac OS, Linux
- First release: Myth: The Fallen Lords; November 25, 1997
- Latest release: Myth III: The Wolf Age; November 2, 2001

Myth is a series of real-time tactics video games for Microsoft Windows and Mac OS. There are three main games in the series: Myth: The Fallen Lords (1997), Myth II: Soulblighter (1998), and Myth III: The Wolf Age (2001). The Fallen Lords was developed by Bungie, and published by Bungie in North America and Eidos Interactive in Europe. Soulblighter was also developed by Bungie, and was published by Bungie in North America and GT Interactive in Europe. The Wolf Age was developed by MumboJumbo, and co-published by Take-Two Interactive and Gathering of Developers for Windows and by Take-Two and MacSoft for Mac.

All three games received generally positive reviews. The Fallen Lords was especially lauded, and is credited as a defining title in the fledgling real-time tactics genre. Reviewers praised its plot, graphics, gameplay, level design, online multiplayer mode, and differentiation from traditional real-time strategy games. It went on to win multiple awards from publications such as PC Gamer, Computer Gaming World, Computer Games Strategy Plus, and Macworld. It was also a commercial success, selling over 350,000 units worldwide. Soulblighter was praised for improving on virtually every aspect of The Fallen Lords, with critics citing more detailed graphics, enhanced sound effects, more varied gameplay, better AI, and a more intricate level design. It also sold very well, considerably outselling the original. The Wolf Age was seen as inferior to the two previous games, although it still garnered positive reviews. Reviewers praised the storyline, graphics, and general gameplay. Major points of criticism included the many bugs in the Windows version, and a poorly implemented online multiplayer mode. Some critics felt the game was rushed to release, with several speculating the development team had not been given enough time to complete it satisfactorily.

The Myth series as a whole, and Soulblighter in particular, supported an active online community for over a decade after the official servers went offline. The first formally organized group of volunteer-programmers was MythDevelopers, who initially formed with the purpose of fixing the bug-ridden Windows version of The Wolf Age. MythDevelopers were given access to the source code of both the first games by Bungie and The Wolf Age by Take-Two. The most recently active Myth development group is Project Magma, an offshoot of MythDevelopers. These groups have worked to provide ongoing technical support for the games, update them to newer operating systems, fix bugs, release unofficial patches, create mods, and maintain online servers for multiplayer gaming. As of 2017, the IP is owned by Take-Two Interactive (which owned 20% of Bungie before Microsoft's acquisition), but the trademark registration expired in 2021.

== Games ==
Release timeline
1997	Myth: The Fallen Lords
1998	Myth II: Soulblighter
1999	Myth: The Total Codex
2000
2001	Green Berets: Powered by Myth II
2001	Myth II: Worlds
2001	Myth III: The Wolf Age

- Myth: The Fallen Lords was developed by Bungie for Microsoft Windows and the Classic Mac OS. Published by Bungie in North America and by Eidos Interactive in Europe, it was released in North America for both Windows and Mac on November 25, 1997.
- Myth II: Soulblighter was also developed by Bungie for Microsoft Windows and Mac OS. Published by Bungie in North America and by GT Interactive in Europe, it was released in North America for both Windows and Mac on December 28, 1998. It was later ported to Linux by Loki Entertainment. On November 15, 1999, Bungie released a special edition called Myth: The Total Codex, which included The Fallen Lords, Soulblighter, the Soulblighter expansion pack Myth II: Chimera, and official Strategies and Secrets guides for both of the main games. In 2001, Soulblighter was also re-released twice by Take-Two Interactive. Firstly, included with Green Berets: Powered by Myth II, a fan made total conversion set in the Vietnam War, which was released on July 31, and secondly as Myth II: Worlds, a three-disk set published by Take-Two subsidiary Gathering of Developers, containing Soulblighter and two disks of fan-created single-player campaigns, multiplayer maps, and gameplay mods, which was released on October 2.
- Myth III: The Wolf Age was developed by MumboJumbo for Windows, Classic Mac OS and Mac OS X. Co-published by Take-Two and Gathering of Developers for Windows, and by Take-Two and MacSoft for Mac, the Windows version was released in North America on November 2, 2001.

== Gameplay ==
All three Myth games are real-time tactics games. Unlike in real-time strategy gameplay, the player does not engage in resource micromanagement or economic macromanagement, does not construct a base or buildings, and does not gradually build up their army by acquiring resources and researching new technologies. Instead, each level begins with the player's army already assembled and ready for combat. During the game, the player controls forces of various sizes made up of different units, each possessing their own strengths and weaknesses. In single-player mode, only Light units are playable, but in online multiplayer mode, the player can control both Light and Dark units.

Screenshot of gameplay in The Fallen Lords, showing the selection of multiple units. The player has selected five Berserks (units on the left surrounded by yellow rectangles). The image also shows unselected archers and dwarfs. At the top of the screen is the Status Bar. The mini-map of the battlefield is just below on the right.

Basic gameplay in all three games consists of the player selecting and commanding units. The player clicks a unit to select it. A selected unit is marked by a surrounding yellow rectangle, beside which is a health meter, which diminishes as the unit takes damage. In Soulblighter and The Wolf Age, units capable of using magic also have a mana meter, which diminishes through magic use and slowly regenerates over time. Units do not regenerate health, and there is no way to construct new units (although in some single-player missions, reinforcements are automatically received at predetermined points). When the player double-clicks on any unit, all nearby units of the same type are also selected. To select multiple units of different types, the player can either "shift click" (hold down the shift key while clicking individual units) or use "band-selection" (click and drag the cursor across the screen, selecting all units within the inscribed rectangle). All units on screen, irrespective of type, can be selected by pressing the enter key. The player can also assign manually selected groups of units to a specific key on the keyboard; pressing that key then instantly selects the units in the desired group. In The Wolf Age, the HUD also includes a "Unit Grouping Bar" which allows the player to select their group by clicking on the corresponding number rather than using the keyboard.

Once one or more units have been selected, the player can click on the ground to make them walk to the selected spot, or click on an enemy to make them attack. Units with projectile weapons, such as archers and dwarves can also be ordered to attack a specific spot on the ground, rather than an enemy. It is also important that the player have their units facing in the correct direction. In The Fallen Lords, this is accomplished by "gesture clicking": using the mouse to indicate which way the units will face when they reach their destination. In Soulblighter and The Wolf Age, it can be accomplished by either gesture clicking, or by pressing the left or right arrow key as the units move to the selected location. Facing the correct direction is especially relevant when using formations. After selecting a group of units, the player must press the corresponding formation button on the keyboard, and then click on the ground where they want the units to form. The player can also order all selected units to scatter and to retreat. In Soulblighter and The Wolf Age, all formations—as well as commands such as stopping, guarding, scattering, retreating, and reversing direction—are also available via a single click in the Control Bar at the bottom of the screen.

Screenshot of Soulblighter, showing the selection of a single unit—a bowman named Hadrian, as indicated by the Status Bar at the top of the screen

When a single unit is selected, information about that unit appears in the "Status Bar" at the top of the HUD: the unit's name, biography, number of kills, number of battles survived, and (if he is capable of carrying items) inventory. When multiple units are selected, only the names, types, and quantity of units appear. The HUD also features a transparent overhead mini-map, which displays information about the current battlefield—the player's field of vision is indicated by a yellow trapezoid, enemy units appear as red dots, friendly non-playable units as blue dots, and the player's army as green dots. The player can click anywhere on the mini-map to instantly jump to that location. However, the mini-map does not initially display the entire battlefield; the player must explore the area for it to become fully mapped. In Soulblighter, the player can also order troops to move to any location on the mapped area of the battlefield by right-clicking on that area in the mini-map.

The player has full control over the camera throughout the game, and can move, orbit, pan, and zoom the camera via the keyboard. In The Fallen Lords, the mouse can be used to move the camera forwards, backwards, left, and right by moving the cursor to the top, bottom, left, or right of the screen, respectively. In Soulblighter and The Wolf Age, the player can also select preferences to enable rotation and orbiting via the mouse by moving the cursor to the top and bottom corners of the screen, respectively.

Selecting and commanding units only forms the basic interactions of the Myth games. Battles are more complex than simply commanding units to attack the enemy—strategy, battlefield conditions, and even weather all play important roles. For example, due to the game's physics engine, objects collide with each another and the terrain. This can manifest itself simply in a severed head bouncing off one of the player's units and changing direction, but it can also have more serious consequences, such as friendly fire. For instance, archers firing at enemies engaged in melee combat risk hitting allied units, causing the same amount of damage. Also, projectiles are not guaranteed to hit; they are merely propelled in the direction instructed by the physics engine. Thus, for example, a dwarf could throw a molotov cocktail at an enemy on a hillside and miss, with the projectile rolling back down the hill towards the player's own units. Arrows may miss their intended target due to a small degree of simulated aiming error that becomes more significant at long range, or the target may move out of the way or behind cover.

Weather also influences gameplay. Rain or snow can extinguish explosive-based attacks, and in The Wolf Age, strong wind can cause problems for archers in hitting their targets. It is also much easier for projectile units to hit enemies below them rather than above them, and as such, positioning of the player's units is an important aspect of the game.

=== Single-player ===
In each of the three games' single-player campaigns, the player starts each mission with a group of soldiers and must use that group to accomplish a specific goal or set of goals. These goals can involve killing a certain number of enemies, defending a location, reaching a certain point on the map, escorting a unit safely to a certain area, or destroying a specific object or enemy. The focus of the single-player campaign is on a smaller force defeating a much larger enemy force; in every mission, the Light units are outnumbered by enemies, often vastly, and so the player must use the terrain, employ the specific skills of their individual units, and gradually decrease the enemy force, or attempt to avoid it altogether. Units in the single-player campaign acquire experience with each kill. Experience increases attack rate, accuracy, and defence, and any unit that survives a battle will carry over to the next battle with their accumulated experience (assuming the next battle features units of that type). In the single-player campaign in The Wolf Age, players can avail of a "morale boost" for normal units when fighting alongside "Champion" units; any normal unit engaged in combat whilst in close proximity to a Champion unit will gain experience at a faster rate than normal.

=== Multiplayer ===
Upon release, The Fallen Lords and Soulblighter could be used for multiplayer gaming on Bungie.net, or via a LAN on PC or AppleTalk on Mac, whilst The Wolf Age could be played on GameSpy, or via a LAN on PC or AppleTalk on Mac. In multiplayer, the player starts with an army, and can customize it by trading units with other players, using point values that approximate the value of the units being traded.

All three games have similar, but not identical, multiplayer modes. The following modes are common to each of the three games:

- "King of the Hill" – A hill on the map is marked with a flag. The hill becomes "captured" when one or more of a team's units move within a certain range of the flag and eliminate any enemy units in the same area. The winner is the team who controls the hill for the longest amount of time.
- "Steal the Bacon" – Somewhere on the battlefield is a ball; the objective is to get the ball and keep it away from the opponents, with the winner being the last team to touch the ball.
- "Balls on Parade" – Each team has a ball; the objective is to capture as many of the opponents' balls as possible, with winner being the team in possession of the most balls at the end of the game.
- "Flag Rally" – Multiple flags are on the battlefield, with the winner being the first player to touch them all.
- "Capture the Flag" – Each team begins the game with one flag, with the winner being the first team to capture the other team's flag.
- "Scavenger Hunt" – Multiple balls are on the battlefield, with the winner being the first player to touch them all.
- "Captures" – Multiple balls are on the battlefield, with the winner being the player who is in possession of the most balls at the end of the match.
- "Body Count" – Team deathmatch.
- "Last Man on the Hill" – Whichever player "owns" the hill when time runs out is the winner.

Unique to Soulblighter and The Wolf Age are the following modes:

- "Assassin" – Each team has a "target unit", with the winner being the team who kills the opponents' target first.
- "Hunting" – Each team must kill as much wildlife as possible; each animal has a point value, and the winner is the team with the most points at the end of the game.
- "Stampede!" – Each team starts with a herd of animals and a number of flags; the object is to shepherd the herd to the enemy flags, with each successfully herded animal earning the team one point. The winner is the team with the most points at the end of the game.

Unique to Soulblighter is "Choke the Chicken" (identical to Assassin, except the target unit assigned to each team is a non-playable chicken). Unique to The Wolf Age is "Assault" (teams alternative defending a flag from their opponent; the attacking team scores a point if they touch the flag, the defending team score a point if they prevent the flag being touched. The winner is the team with the most points after both teams have attacked and defended).

== History ==
=== Development ===
==== The Fallen Lords ====
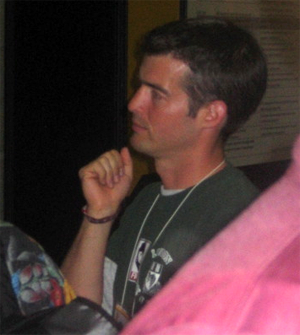
Jason Jones conceived of Myth as an alternative to Bungie developing another first-person shooter.

Myth: The Fallen Lords was originally conceived by Jason Jones as Bungie was nearing the end of development of Marathon Infinity in late 1995. They had planned to do another first-person shooter as their next game. However, when Jones saw the first screenshots from id Software's Quake, he became concerned that Bungie's new game would be too similar. As such, he approached his colleagues with the question: "What do you think about having this world with 100 guys fighting 100 other guys in 3D?" His idea was to bring Bungie's experience in 3D action games to a real-time strategy (RTS) game. The team agreed their new shooter was developing along lines too similar to Quake, and, as such, they abandoned the project, and switched focus to what ultimately became Myth.

Dubbed "The Giant Bloody War Game", initial inspirations were films such as Mel Gibson's Braveheart and literature such as Glen Cook's The Black Company. Doug Zartman, Bungie's director of public relations and one of the game's writers, explained: "We wanted to capture the feeling that you get watching large groups of people clashing on the open field". He was also eager to differentiate the game from standard RTS games:

We tried real hard to come up with a term that was different from "real-time". We're calling it a "multimetric tactical game". "Multimetric" - I made that word up - because it's not an isometric game in the conventional sense. There are many angles a player can have and many views the camera can take. And we're calling it "tactical" because there are no elements of the game that focus on resources or management. It's strictly a tactical game.

Once they had decided on the basic game mechanics, which ultimately became known as "real-time tactics", they drew up a list of elements they wanted to avoid (RTS clichés, references to Middle-earth, allusions to the Arthurian legend, any narrative involving "little boys coming of age and saving the world") and those they wanted to incorporate ("any ideas that contributed to the visual realism of the game", such as a 3D landscape, polygonal buildings, particle-based weather, and battlefields littered with body parts). They were also determined to include a robust online multiplayer mode as a key gameplay feature.

Work on the game began in January 1996, with a major early decision being to develop and release the game simultaneously for both Mac OS and Microsoft Windows. At the time, Bungie's only Windows game had been a port of Marathon 2: Durandal, with which they had been unhappy, and they were determined The Fallen Lords be a genuine cross-platform release. As such, 90% of the game's source code was platform-independent, with 5% written for Windows subroutines and 5% for Mac-specific functionality. All of the game's data was stored in platform-independent data files called "tags", which were automatically byte-swapped when necessary and accessed via a cross-platform file manager.

Although The Fallen Lords employs a fully 3D terrain, with 3D polygonal buildings, the characters are 2D sprites. To bring the 3D environment and the 2D characters together, the team developed four separate programming tools: "Tag Editor" (edited the constants in the cross-platform data files), "Extractor" (handled the 2D sprites and the sequencing of their animations), "Loathing" (the map editor), and "Fear" (dealt with the 3D polygonal models such as houses, pillars, and walls). Of the four programs, Jones explained:

The Tag Editor lets you edit everything from the physics of the game, to the color of the units, how they move, and how they attack. There's another tool that we use to import graphics called the Extractor, and there's a third tool called Loathing. Loathing is basically the map editor for Myth. You import your map into it, you change the heights, and you place your units on the map in Loathing. The fourth tool that complements Loathing is called Fear. Fear takes care of all the models; it is used to import the 3D rendered models.

By November 1996, Bungie had a demo with rudimentary gameplay in place. In an effort to create media buzz, they took the demo to several gaming magazines. Speaking in 2000, Doug Zartman explained the physics engine was a major factor in the game even at this early stage:

There wasn't much gameplay in what we showed them - two small groups on opposite sides of a small map rushing at each other, becoming a bloody knot at the middle where they all collided and blew each other up. And the AI was crude. But the reviewers could see that it had strategic combat on real 3D terrain - something no other game at the time had, something that radically changed how the game was played; an archer could fire farther from the top of the hill than from in the valley. It was easy to demonstrate to the press that an archer on high ground was going to defeat an archer down in the valley.

The Fallen Lords originally supported both software rendering and 3dfx's Glide hardware acceleration. Soon after it was released, Bungie released a v1.1 upgrade patch, which added support for Rendition's Redline, and 3dfx's Voodoo Rush.

==== Soulblighter ====
Myth II: Soulblighter went into development immediately after The Fallen Lords proved a commercial success. One of Bungie's main goals with the sequel was to include gameplay aspects and game mechanics which they had wanted to feature in The Fallen Lords, but had been unable to implement due to time constraints. Of the initial planning for Soulblighter, Alex Seropian, Bungie's co-founder, said:

We had a lot of specific design goals for Myth II. Part of those things are enhancements to the engine as well as the gameplay. There were some things in the gameplay and artificial intelligence that made the original annoyingly difficult, and those were some of the things we wanted to enhance. In addition to that, we decided to touch basically every facet of the game. We wanted to make the music and sound better, the graphics - so we basically retouched every area of the Myth gaming experience.

New to Soulblighter were moving 3D models within the gaming world, something none of Bungie staff had ever created before. For example, the opening level features a fully functional windmill, and a later level features a drawbridge that closes as the level begins, and which the player must then lower so their army can gain access to a castle. Although the original game featured the same kind of 3D polygonal models, none of them moved, and implementing this feature proved to be one of the biggest challenges the team encountered in making the game. Another challenge also involved something not seen in the first game: a level set indoors. For this level, which is set in a large castle, the AI had to be rewritten as two enemy units could be right beside one another but not be able to see each other because of a wall between them. Previously, two units standing beside one another would automatically attack. Writing this new code into the AI scripting language proved especially difficult for the programmers.

In terms of the game's graphics, as with The Fallen Lords, each level in Soulblighter is constructed on a polygonal mesh. However, the mesh used in the sequel is four times finer than in the original, and hence the graphics are more detailed and smoother. Like the first game, although the game world itself is fully 3D, the characters populating each level are 2D sprites. The sprites in Soulblighter have many more frames of animation than those in The Fallen Lords, and so move more smoothly. Explaining why the team stuck with the concept of using 2D sprites in a 3D terrain, producer Tuncer Deniz stated:

It's a performance issue. The reason we went with sprites for the characters is because in Myth you can have one hundred units on the screen at the same time, and if they were all polygonal models, even those with the fastest home computers wouldn't be able to play the game.

Soulblighter originally supported software rendering, all 3dfx and Rendition GPUs, and any graphics cards that supported Direct3D for Windows and QuickDraw 3D for Mac. The game also supported 3D audio, specifically Aureal Semiconductor's A3D and Creative Labs' EAX.

Screenshot from Blue & Grey, an American Civil War set total conversion of Soulblighter, created by the community using the Fear and Loathing tools.

When Soulblighter was released, Bungie included the "Fear" and "Loathing" programming tools, which allowed players to create new units and maps. Bungie themselves strongly encouraged the creativity of their fan base in using these tools. For example, in April 1999, they issued a press release regarding the World War II total conversion, Myth II: Recon, saying: "This kind of plug-in was exactly what the Myth II tools were intended to inspire, and is an excellent sign that Myth mapmakers are taking this game world in fascinating new directions."

==== The Wolf Age ====
In 1999, Bungie sold 19.9% of their shares to Take-Two Interactive. In June 2000, Bungie was purchased outright by Microsoft, with Take-Two acquiring the Oni and Myth intellectual properties. Myth III: The Wolf Age was announced by Take-Two subsidiary Gathering of Developers in January 2001, when they revealed MumboJumbo were developing the game for Windows and Mac OS. The Wolf Age would be MumboJumbo's first game.

Addressing the issue of remaining faithful to the two previous games whilst still introducing new elements to the franchise, MumboJumbo president Mark Dochtermann explained the developers did not intend to reinvent the series' basic gameplay, although they were keen to try out new things: "There's a lot left to explore in the Myth franchise even before we go in a somewhat different route. Although, we are taking a [new] route in terms of adding 3D acceleration, 3D models, and doing stuff with the terrain engine and physics that are still way beyond what the other RTS games are doing right now." Similarly, producer and lead designer Scott Campbell stated: "We intend to pay respect to Myth and its fans. We don't care to change the whole appeal of the game just so we can call it ours." With this in mind, MumboJumbo hired three members of Soulblighter's modding community to work on the game. Although initially hired to work on technical aspects, they became invaluable to MumboJumbo in terms of writing the storyline. Executive producer Mike Donges explained that "they're our Myth lore experts, so if we try to put in something new, they have the ability to [reject it]".

Screenshot of Myth III showing the 3D character models in a 3D terrain. In contrast, the previous games in the series used 2D sprites in 3D terrains.

Although The Wolf Age was built using Soulblighter's source code, the developers made significant changes, the single biggest of which was that everything in The Wolf Age is rendered in OpenGL 3D, including the characters and all environmental objects. The Wolf Age was the first Myth game to feature fully 3D characters, rather than 2D sprites in a 3D environment. Of the move to full 3D, Dochtermann points out that the 3D engine allows for things not possible in the previous games: "There's some very cool kinematics stuff. So when you have explosions, and when your units move through the world, the trees will respond. And not just blowing them up. You'll see the shock waves from explosions, and you're affecting the environment a lot more. It's a lot more realistic." The new game engine also supported real-time shadows and dynamic lighting, as well as being capable of blending six to seven different texture layers, depending on how close the camera is to the action.

Regarding the programming tools used to create the game, MumboJumbo initially began by using Bungie's "Fear" and "Loathing". However, they never intended to use them for very long, with the plan always being to develop their own tool. Speaking a few months into development, Campbell stated: "We are planning on doing a merger of the tools later on [...] we're actually making tools right now that we will be using for Myth III that are not only cross-platform compatible, but will also allow you to do all the neat new things, use all the new scripting commands and the new models and 3D units and stuff that we're using in this game." The new tool was eventually called "Vengeance". At the E3 event in May 2001, MumboJumbo promised that Vengeance would ship with the game.

The Wolf Age went gold on October 17, 2001, completing a development cycle of only ten months, a relatively fast time to develop a major video game. Soon before the game's release, PC Gamer's Jim Preston wrote he was skeptical as to whether the developer had been given enough time to satisfactorily complete the game.

On November 16, lead programmer Andrew Meggs posted on Mythvillage.org that the entire Myth III PC team had been laid off by MumboJumbo the same day the game had been released, November 2. In a post titled "Some ugly, but honest truths", Meggs wrote:

The basic reason was that there was no next project lined up and funded, nor was there expected to be in the near future, it's expensive to keep a team of salaried people around doing nothing, and MumboJumbo was not a huge business with infinitely deep pockets. There's a tangled web between the MumboJumbo Irvine project team, its parent company United Developers and the game's publisher Take-Two. I wouldn't blame anyone specifically for the collapse - call it everybody's fault if you're the angry sort or nobody's fault if you're charitable.

Meggs explained the team knew there were problems with the Windows version of the game that needed addressing, but, as they had been fired, they were unable to do so. He stated they had been working on a patch to fix many of these problems when they were let go, and he was unsure if this patch would be released. He also acknowledged that many of the criticisms regarding bugs in the game would be addressed by the patch. The same day Meggs made his post, November 16, MumboJumbo closed their offices in Irvine, California, with a view to consolidate their resources in their Dallas headquarters.

Three days later, MumboJumbo denied the Myth III team had been laid off, saying all staff members had been invited to work in the Dallas office. They also announced the patch Meggs had spoken of would be released within the week. On December 19, Mark Dochtermann promised the patch would be released before Christmas, along with Vengeance, which had not been shipped with the game. The patch was never officially released by MumboJumbo.

=== End-of-support ===
After Bungie released the Total Codex bundle in 1999, which contained The Fallen Lords v1.3, Soulblighter v1.3, and the Soulblighter expansion pack, Myth II: Chimera, they ceased working to develop the game's source code, as Microsoft wanted them to concentrate on Halo. The official Bungie Myth servers were closed in February 2002.

=== Community-driven development ===
Despite the official end-of-life, the Myth series continued to have an active online fanbase, particularly Soulblighter. The first organised group of programmers, artists, and coders from the game's community was known as MythDevelopers, who requested and were granted access to the source code so as to continue its development. With the permission of Take-Two, Bungie released their entire archive of Myth-related materials to MythDevelopers, including the source code, artwork, all creative files (such as maps, 3D models, scripts, etc.), and documentation, over 80 gigabytes of material. MythDevelopers was also granted access to the source code for The Wolf Age. Bungie also open-sourced their Myth metaserver source code in 2002.

MythDevelopers used this material to improve and further develop the games. Although their initial focus was on the bug-ridden release version of The Wolf Age, they also worked to update the first two games to newer operating systems on both Mac and PC, fix bugs, and create unofficial patches to enhance both the games themselves and the mapmaking tools. They also developed their own library, dubbed the Myth Core Library, which provided networking, input routines, and other low-level functions. This enabled MythDevelopers to avoid the necessity of licensing any external libraries, and instead allowed them to develop everything in-house. This was part of their deal with Take-Two, as they couldn't incorporate anything into the games which they would be unable to give Take-Two the rights to should the company ever ask for the source code back; all modifications remained the intellectual property of Take-Two, who were free to use them in a future commercial version of Myth, if they ever wanted to re-release an upgraded version of one or more of the games, or incorporate the modifications into the development of a new Myth game.

In April 2003, MythDevelopers released a v1.1 patch for The Wolf Age for both Windows and Mac. Fixing over forty gameplay and stability issues, and addressing numerous bugs, the patch also included new multiplayer maps and gameplay modes. MythDevelopers disbanded in December 2003, with Project Magma becoming the main development group for The Fallen Lords and Soulblighter, and FlyingFlip Studios for The Wolf Age. Magma's final patch for The Fallen Lords was v1.5, released in 2005, which added support for OpenGL 1.3 for both PC and Mac. FlyingFlip's final patch for The Wolf Age was v1.3, released in 2004, which introduced multiple gameplay and stability improvements, as well as bug fixes, and performance enhancements. FlyingFlip disbanded in 2007.

Soulblighter received considerably more attention from the modding community than either The Fallen Lords or The Wolf Age. Between 2003 and 2013, Project Magma released multiple major patches, each of which included fixes for bugs, graphical problems, gameplay problems, and interface issues, as well as improve the Fear and Loathing tools and the online multiplayer mode. However, each patch also tended to feature one or more "major" enhancement. For example, v1.3.2, developed in association with MythDevelopers in 2003, allowed Soulblighter to run natively under OS X. Also developed in association with MythDevelopers in 2003 was v1.4, which introduced OpenGL support for the OS X version and allowed the player to play Soulblighter with Fallen Lords style gameplay (dubbed vTFL). In 2004, Magma released their first standalone patch, v1.5, which was originally intended as a minor clean-up patch for some of the problems introduced in v1.4. For example, v1.4 broke a number of fan-developed plug-ins. Additionally, as the developers did not have access to The Fallen Lords source code when designing vTFL, the feature was unreliable. Magma's plan with v1.5 was to get the gameplay and plug-in compatibility back to the standard of Bungie's last official version of the game, but retain the v1.4 features that worked. During development of v1.5, they also gained access to The Fallen Lords source code, and so completely rewrote the vTFL option. Magma's final patch, v1.8, was released in 2013, and added several new game modes to multiplayer gaming, improved the usage of CPU resources, added a new texture decompression code which loads sprite frames twice as fast as before, enhanced both the texture mapping and the pixel shader, and included (for the first time in a Magma patch) Linux-specific improvements.

In May 2023, an archive said to be the largest historic collection of Myth items was placed on the Internet Archive. At well over 1,200 Myth maps, the source centers on 3rd party versions of solo, network, and scenario entries between the initial November 1997 Myth release through early 2023.

=== Community servers ===
Prior to disbanding, MythDevelopers created and operated PlayMyth.net, the most popular online Myth server after the official servers were taken offline. Although built using the Soulblighter server, PlayMyth could also run both The Fallen Lords and The Wolf Age, which was developed by MumboJumbo using a network gameplay system designed to run on GameSpy rather than Bungie. PlayMyth went offline in October 2007 after it was repeatedly hacked, with the most popular servers becoming MariusNet.com and GateofStorms.net.

MariusNet had been online since just prior to Bungie's Myth servers going offline, and was officially approved by Bungie. The original impetus behind the project was as a temporary replacement for Myth players in case the original servers were shut down, which had been rumored for some time. The Bungie servers had not supported The Fallen Lords since November 2001, and the community believed the servers would soon close for Soulblighter as well. When The Fallen Lords servers closed in November, the only way to play a multiplayer game was via a LAN or AppleTalk, and MariusNet was created as a Bungie "emulator", which, like PlayMyth, supported all three Myth games, and thus gave players a way to play The Fallen Lords online. At the time, Bungie had not open-sourced the metaserver source code, so creating a network for The Fallen Lords was accomplished via reverse engineering. Dave Carlile, the main programmer of the server, explained:

We started with some information about the Myth 2 network protocol, and hoped Myth was the same or very similar. [Todd Snyder] then used a packet sniffer to look at the data being sent back and forth between the Myth 2 client and the server in order to learn more. We initially made a partial Myth 2 server to get the basics down, then spent hundreds of hours figuring out the differences in packet structure in Myth. For a few of the more difficult pieces we used a disassembler to take apart the client code, and also a debugger to trace through the code.

MariusNet closed in 2014 when the server company shut down, and the hardware was damaged whilst being moved to its new location. GateofStorms, which was created by Project Magma and only supports Soulblighter v1.8 (released by Magma in 2013), remains active, and continues to host individual games and tournaments.

== Reception ==
Aggregate review scores As of May 4, 2016.
Game	Metacritic
Myth: The Fallen Lords	91/100
Myth II: Soulblighter	88/100
Myth III: The Wolf Age	76/100

All three main games in the Myth series received positive reviews, especially The Fallen Lords and Soulblighter, which were universally acclaimed. Although The Wolf Age was generally well reviewed, it was seen as considerably inferior to the two previous games.

GameSpot's Michael E. Ryan wrote of The Fallen Lords that it "can claim its place among the best strategy games on the market", calling it "one of the most impressive games you'll see this year", and "a truly remarkable real-time strategy game". Game Revolution's Calvin Hubble called it "one of the most impressive looking strategy games to hit the market".

Ryan called Soulblighter "as good as a computer game can possibly be" and "one of the best games to be released this year". Hubble called it "both one of the best sequels to hit the scene and one of the finest titles on the RTS market". IGN's Tal Blevins said the game "lives up to (and surpasses) all of the hype surrounding [it]".

IGN's Dan Adams wrote of The Wolf Age: "Fans of the series shouldn't be disappointed by MumboJumbo's effort to follow in the mighty footsteps that Bungie left behind". GameSpot's Sam Parker wrote that "[…] Myth III's single-player game represents the best the Myth series has to offer". However, he was critical of the absence of many promised multiplayer features, the absence of the Vengeance mapmaking tool, and compatibility issues with Windows XP. GameSpy's William Abner wrote: "[…] The Wolf Age isn't a complete product. It's close. And parts of it are just as fun, if not more so, than the earlier games, but a laundry list of bugs, hardware glitches, and severe multiplayer issues keep the game from reaching its potential." He too was critical of the absence of Vengeance and of multiplayer mode.

=== Sales and awards ===
According to Bungie co-founder Alex Seropian, The Fallen Lords cost roughly $2 million to produce and market, by far Bungie's most expensive game up to that time, and as such, they needed it to be financially successful, especially as it was their first original PC game. The game did prove to be a commercial success, selling over 350,000 units worldwide at roughly $40 per unit, earning the company $14 million, and becoming Bungie's most successful game thus far. By 2000, the game had over 100,000 people registered with online accounts at Bungie for multiplayer games. The success of the game also helped Bungie rank #101 in Inc.'s 1998 list of the 500 fastest growing private corporations in North America. Primarily due to the success of The Fallen Lords, Bungie's profits had increased by 2,228% from 1993 to 1997.

The Fallen Lords also won numerous awards, including "Real-Time Strategy Game of the Year" from PC Gamer, "Strategy Game of the Year" from Computer Gaming World, and "Game of the Year" from both Computer Games Strategy Plus and Macworld. Online Game Review named it one of the fifty greatest games ever made.

Soulblighter considerably outsold The Fallen Lords. In North America, pre-orders for the game reached 140,000 units. When v1.1 was released on January 7, day one sales reached roughly the same number of units the original sold worldwide.
