= Enter and return keys =

Key on computer keyboards

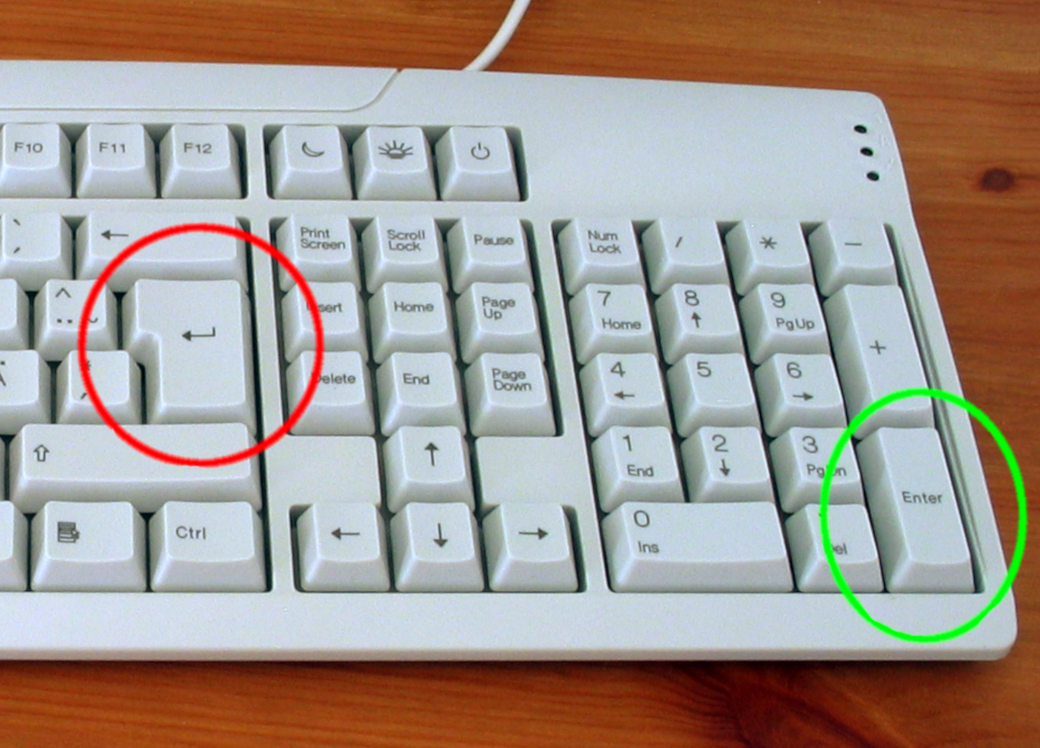
The return (red circle on the left) and enter (green circle on the right) keys on a keyboard

On computer keyboards, the enter key ⌅ Enter and return key ↵ Return are two closely related keys with overlapping and distinct functions dependent on operating system and application.

== Functions ==
The return key has its origins in two typewriter functions: carriage return, which would reset the carriage to the beginning of the line of text, and line feed, which would advance the paper one line downward. These were often combined into a single return key, a convention that continues in modern computer word processing to insert a paragraph break (¶).

An OK button which can be invoked by pressing a return key, or possibly an enter key

The enter key is a computer innovation, which in most cases causes the active user interface to operate its default function.

- For command lines, this is typically to execute the entered command.
- For dialog boxes, it is an alternative to clicking the preselected button, usually an OK button.
- For the address bar of a web browser or file manager, it is displaying the web page or folder that the typed address refers to.
- For calculator programs, it is calculating the result of the typed expression.

On modern computers both keys generally have all the functions of the other, allowing for either key to be used, or even for them to be combined into a single key, as is the case with most laptops. Microsoft Windows makes no distinction between them whatsoever, and usually both keys are labelled as enter on Windows keyboards with the United States layout. Other operating systems, such as Apple's Darwin-based operating systems, generally treat them equivalently while still maintaining the technical and descriptive distinction, allowing applications to treat the two keys differently if necessary.

== Location ==

Return (red) and Enter (green) keys highlighted on the ANSI United States layout (top) and ISO British layout (bottom).

The enter key is typically located to the right of the 3 and . keys on the lower right of the numeric keypad, while the return key is situated on the right edge of the main alphanumeric portion of the keyboard. On ISO and JIS keyboards, return is a stepped double-height key spanning the second and third rows, below ⌫ Backspace and above the right-hand ⇧ Shift. On ANSI keyboards it is wider but located on the third row only, as the backslash \ key is located between it and ⌫ Backspace.

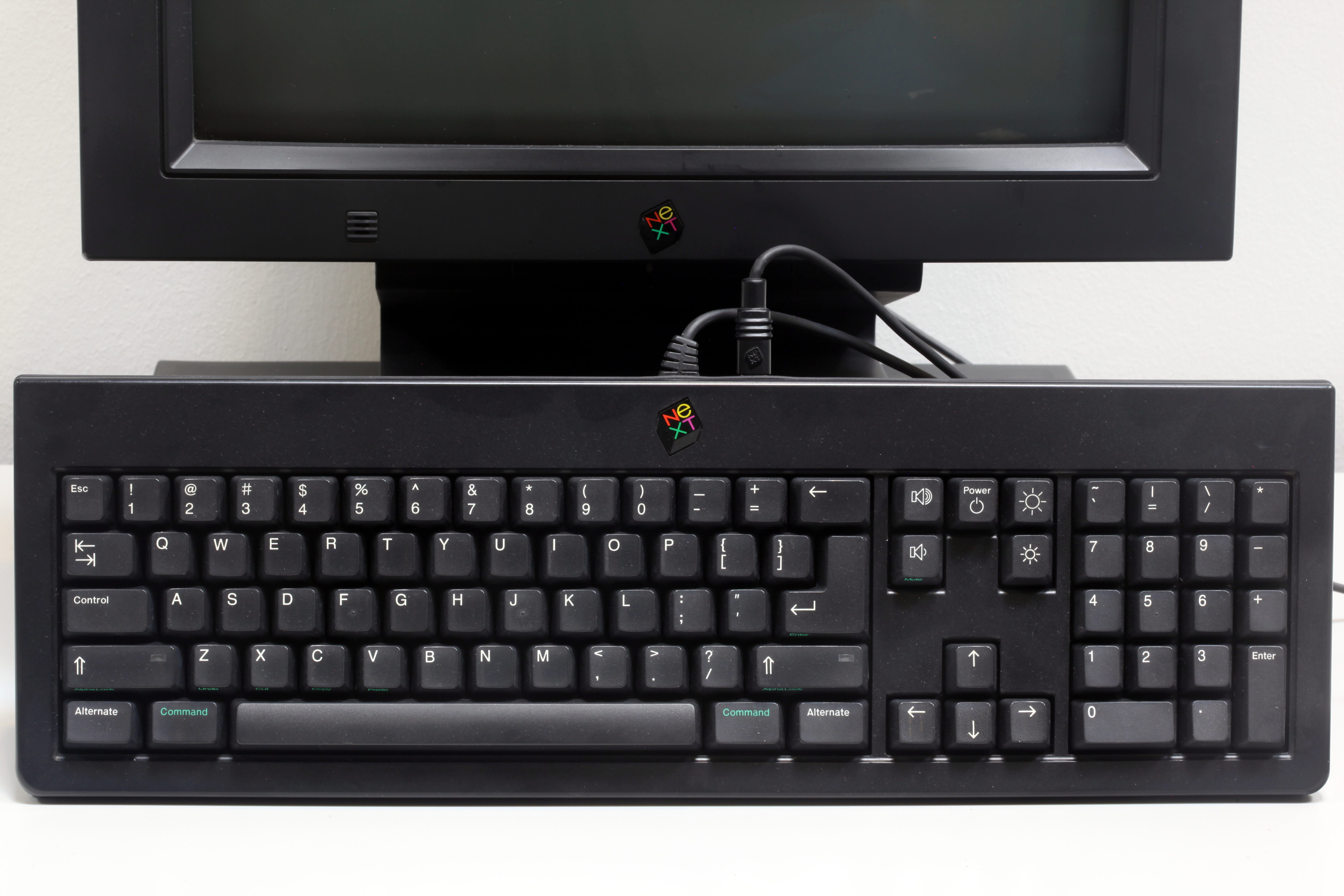
An example of a non-standard double-height ANSI return key on the NeXTstation keyboard (alongside several other non-standard elements)

Some variants of the ANSI keyboard layout create a double-height return key by subsuming the backslash \ key into it. This alternate form is most popular in Asia. However, this requires the relocation of the backslash key and is relatively uncommon on modern keyboards elsewhere.

=== Keyboard symbols ===
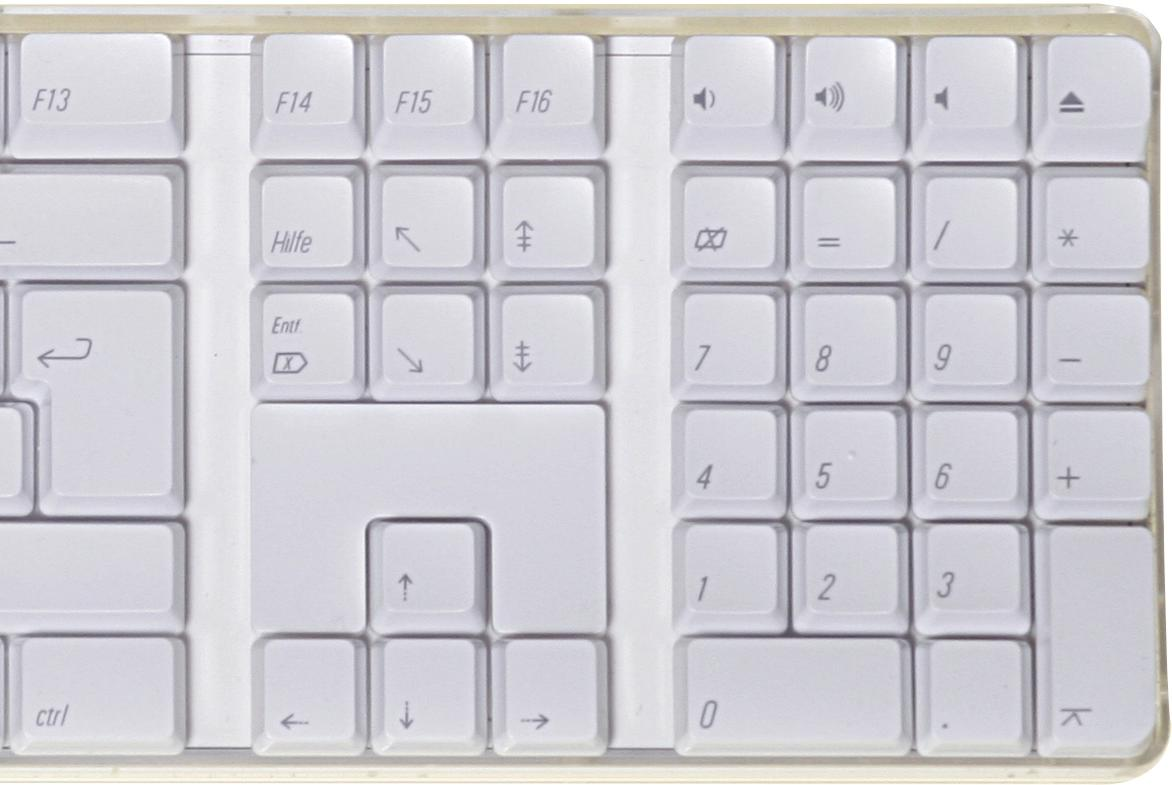
Apple Pro keyboard, showing symbols on the return key and, on the number pad, the enter key

The return key symbol is U+23CE ⏎ RETURN SYMBOL, an arrow pointing down and leftward; however, rendering of the symbol varies greatly by typeface, with it appearing hollow in some or with an additional initial rightward bar in others. For this reason, U+21B5 ↵ DOWNWARDS ARROW WITH CORNER LEFTWARDS or U+21A9 ↩ LEFTWARDS ARROW WITH HOOK are sometimes used instead. On most ISO and other keyboards worldwide the return key is labelled solely with the ⏎ symbol across all platforms. Meanwhile, on ANSI US keyboards it is labelled as ↵ Enter by Windows OEMs (sometimes even without the return symbol) and as return by Apple.

For enter, U+2386 ⎆ ENTER SYMBOL exists in Unicode for the ISO 9995-7 enter key symbol; however, it is infrequently used, one example being the French Canadian keyboard. Windows keyboards worldwide tend to simply label the key with the text ↵ Enter, while Apple uses the symbol ⌤ (U+2324 ⌤ UP ARROWHEAD BETWEEN TWO HORIZONTAL BARS or U+2305 ⌅ PROJECTIVE) on ISO and JIS keyboards and the text ⌅ enter on ANSI US keyboards; this is acknowledged by an annotation "enter key" on U+2324 in the Unicode code chart.

== History ==
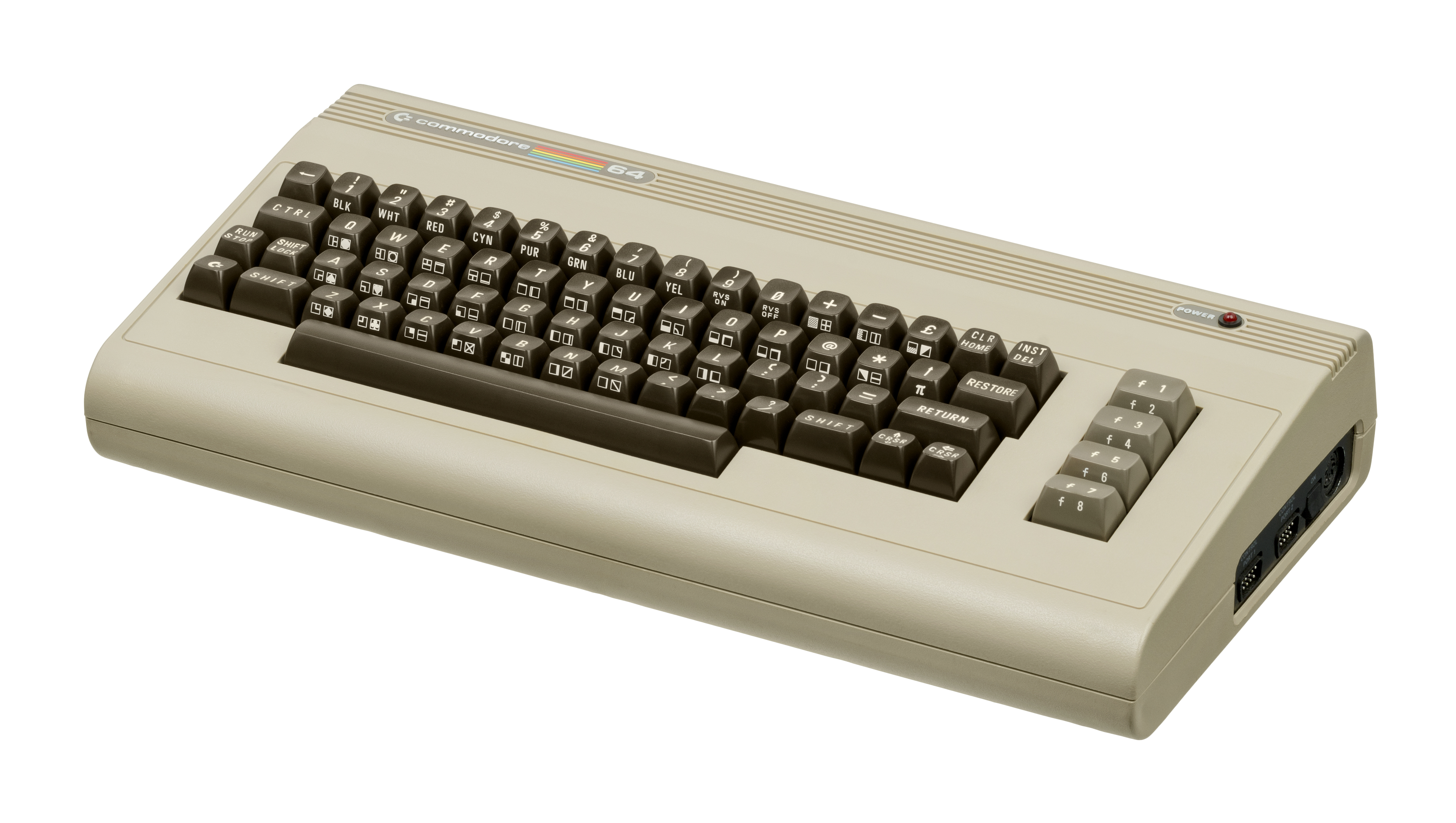
The Commodore 64 (released in 1982) had only the "return" key.

On IBM's 3270 and 5250 line of terminals, the Enter key was located to the right of the space bar and was used to send the contents of the terminal's buffer to the host computer. The Return key was located in a more standard location and was used to generate a new line.

Apple also took advantage of this situation to create an editable command line environment called a "Worksheet" in the Macintosh Programmer's Workshop, where return was used strictly as a formatting key while enter was used to execute a shell command or series of commands in direct mode. This strict dichotomy has since been relaxed, so that now there are very few situations within macOS where enter and return are not equivalent.

One example of this continued division of use is the type tool in Adobe Photoshop, where the return key produces a new line while the enter key ends editing mode. Another is Mathematica, where the Return key creates a new line, while the Enter key (or Shift-Return) submits the current command for execution.

Historically, many computer models did not have a separate keypad, and only had one button to function as Enter or Return. For example, the Commodore 64 (manufactured from 1982) had only the "Return" key. Most laptop computers continue in this combined tradition.

Before computers, on electric typewriters the "Return" key was kept comparatively large. This is due to the frequency of usage (including the space bar) and is therefore kept large to reduce the likelihood of finger slips.

== See also ==
- Carriage return
- Numeric keypad
