= List of Bungie video games =

Bungie is an American video game developer located in Bellevue, Washington. The company was established in May 1991 by University of Chicago undergraduate student Alex Seropian, who later brought in programmer Jason Jones after publishing Jones's game Minotaur: The Labyrinths of Crete. Originally based in Chicago, Illinois, the company concentrated primarily on Macintosh games during its early years, creating the successful games Pathways Into Darkness and the Marathon and Myth series. A West Coast satellite studio named Bungie West produced the PC and console title Oni in 2001. Microsoft acquired Bungie in 2000; its then-current project was repurposed into a launch title for Microsoft's new Xbox console, called Halo: Combat Evolved. Halo went on to become the Xbox's "killer application", selling millions of copies and spawning a billion dollar franchise. On October 5, 2007, Bungie announced that it had split from Microsoft and became a privately held independent company, Bungie LLC. The company later incorporated and signed a ten-year publishing deal with Activision Blizzard. The company is known for its informal and dedicated workplace culture, and has recently released new titles with Activision, including IP Destiny.

== Games ==
Game	Details
Gnop! Original release date: NA: 1990	Release years by system: 1990 – Mac OS
Gnop! Original release date: NA: 1990	Notes: Freeware Pong clone written by Alex Seropian before Bungie was formed (with the option to purchase the source code for $15).
Operation: Desert Storm Original release date: NA: June 1991	Release years by system: 1991 – Mac OS
Operation: Desert Storm Original release date: NA: June 1991	Notes: Originally written by Alex Seropian by himself before Bungie was formed. Bungie was founded in 1991 to release this game.
Minotaur: The Labyrinths of Crete Original release date: NA: November 1992	Release years by system: 1992 – Mac OS
Minotaur: The Labyrinths of Crete Original release date: NA: November 1992	Notes: A dungeon crawler role-playing game, an early game of the genre to support multiplayer.
Pathways into Darkness Original release date(s): NA: August 1993	Release years by system: 1993 – Mac OS; 2013 – Mac OS X
Pathways into Darkness Original release date(s): NA: August 1993	Notes: First-person shooter and adventure game, initially planned as a sequel to Minotaur, it was developed as an independent story.
Marathon Original release date(s): NA: December 21, 1994	Release years by system: 1994 – Mac OS; 1996 – Apple Pippin; 2011 – iOS, Windows, Mac OS X, and Linux through Aleph One project
Marathon Original release date(s): NA: December 21, 1994	Notes: Bungie's second first-person shooter, pioneered secondary fire modes and objective-based missions.
Marathon 2: Durandal Original release date: NA: November 24, 1995	Release years by system: 1995 – Mac OS; 1996 – Windows, Apple Pippin; 2007 – Xbox Live Arcade; 2011 – iOS, Windows, Mac OS X and Linux through Aleph One project
Marathon 2: Durandal Original release date: NA: November 24, 1995	Notes: Sequel to Marathon, later released on the Xbox Live Arcade with added multiplayer support.
Marathon Infinity Original release dates: NA: October 15, 1996	Release years by system: 1996 – Mac OS; 2011 – iOS, Windows, Mac OS X, and Linux through Aleph One project
Marathon Infinity Original release dates: NA: October 15, 1996	Notes: Final installment of the Marathon trilogy, it was released as freeware in 2005 and open source in 2011.
Weekend Warrior Original release date: NA: February 17, 1997	Release years by system: 1997 – Mac OS
Weekend Warrior Original release date: NA: February 17, 1997	Notes: Developed by Pangea Software and published by Bungie.
Abuse Original release dates: NA: 1997	Release years by system: 1997 – Mac OS
Abuse Original release dates: NA: 1997	Notes: Side scrolling run and gun game developed by Crack dot Com. Bungie published the Mac OS version a year after the original MS-DOS release in 1996. In 1998, the source code was released into the public domain. It was later ported to various platforms by other developers.
Myth: The Fallen Lords Original release dates: NA: November 25, 1997	Release years by system: 1997 – Microsoft Windows, Mac OS
Myth: The Fallen Lords Original release dates: NA: November 25, 1997	Notes: Real-time tactics game played from an aerial viewpoint with support for up to 16 players online.
Myth II: Soulblighter Original release dates: NA: November 30, 1998	Release years by system: 1998 – Microsoft Windows, Mac OS, Linux
Myth II: Soulblighter Original release dates: NA: November 30, 1998	Notes: A sequel to The Fallen Lords, it was re-released in 1999 with an expansion pack, Myth II: Chimera, and a copy of the original game, under the title Myth: The Total Codex.
Oni Original release dates: EU: January 26, 2001 (PC); NA: January 29, 2001; EU: March 9, 2001 (PS2)	Release years by system: 2001 – Microsoft Windows, Mac OS (PlayStation 2 port by Rockstar Games)
Oni Original release dates: EU: January 26, 2001 (PC); NA: January 29, 2001; EU: March 9, 2001 (PS2)	Notes: A third-person brawler, it was the only game developed by Bungie West, a satellite studio located in California.
Halo: Combat Evolved Original release dates: JP: April 25, 2002; NA: November 15, 2001; EU: March 14, 2002	Release years by system: 2001 – Xbox; 2003 – Microsoft Windows; 2003 – Mac OS X 2007 – Games on Demand
Halo: Combat Evolved Original release dates: JP: April 25, 2002; NA: November 15, 2001; EU: March 14, 2002	Notes: Sold over 5 million copies by 2005 and became the Xbox's killer app. It was later remade as Halo: Combat Evolved Anniversary by a partnership of companies, led by 343 Industries.
Halo 2 Original release dates: JP: November 11, 2004; NA: November 9, 2004; EU: November 9, 2004	Release years by system: 2004 – Xbox; 2007 - Microsoft Windows
Halo 2 Original release dates: JP: November 11, 2004; NA: November 9, 2004; EU: November 9, 2004	Notes: Sold 2.4 million copies on its first day, grossing US $125 million, the highest of any entertainment release at the time. It went on to become the highest selling title on the Xbox at 8 million copies sold.
Halo 3 Original release dates: JP: September 27, 2007; NA: September 25, 2007; PAL: September 26, 2007	Release years by system: 2007 – Xbox 360
Halo 3 Original release dates: JP: September 27, 2007; NA: September 25, 2007; PAL: September 26, 2007	Notes: Sold approximately 5 million copies on its first day and US $170 million, taking the record from Halo 2. It sold 11.5 million units in total, the fifth best selling title on the Xbox 360.
Halo 3: ODST Original release date(s): JP: September 24, 2009; NA: September 22, 2009	Release years by system: 2009 – Xbox 360
Halo 3: ODST Original release date(s): JP: September 24, 2009; NA: September 22, 2009	Notes: Sold 2.5 million copies in the first two weeks and 6 million copies in total.
Halo: Reach Original release dates: JP: September 15, 2010; NA: September 14, 2010	Release years by system: 2010 – Xbox 360
Halo: Reach Original release dates: JP: September 15, 2010; NA: September 14, 2010	Notes: Sold US $200 million on its first day and 9 million units in total.
Crimson: Steam Pirates Original release dates: WW: November 18, 2011	Release years by system: 2011 – iOS, Google Chrome
Crimson: Steam Pirates Original release dates: WW: November 18, 2011	Notes: Developed by Harebrained Schemes and published by Bungie through their "Aerospace" program to support indie developers.
Destiny Original release dates: September 9, 2014	Release years by system: 2014 – Xbox 360, Xbox One, PlayStation 3, PlayStation 4
Destiny Original release dates: September 9, 2014	Notes: Bungie's first post-Halo game and the first Bungie game to be published by Activision.
Destiny 2 Original release date(s): September 6, 2017	Release years by system: 2017 – Xbox One, PlayStation 4, Microsoft Windows; 2019 – Stadia; 2020 – PlayStation 5, Xbox Series X/S; 2021 – Microsoft Store
Destiny 2 Original release date(s): September 6, 2017	Notes: Sequel to Destiny, published by Activision from its release up until January 2019 when Bungie terminated its publishing deal with Activision and has since self-published all future installments and expansions.
Marathon Original release date(s): March 5, 2026	Release years by system: 2026 – PlayStation 5, Xbox Series X/S, Microsoft Windows
Marathon Original release date(s): March 5, 2026	Notes: Bungie's first new entry in the Marathon series since 1996 and first Bungie game to be co-published with Sony Interactive Entertainment.
