= M6D Pistol =

Weapon from the Halo video game series

- A render of the M6D Pistol
- Publisher: Xbox Game Studios
- First appearance: Halo: Combat Evolved (2001)
- Genre: First-person shooter

In-universe information
- Type: Firearm
- Owners: Master Chief
- Affiliation: United Nations Space Command

The M6D Pistol, also known as the Halo CE pistol, M6D Magnum Sidearm or M6D Personal Defense Weapon System, is a fictional pistol featured in the Halo franchise of video games. It is one of the starting weapons used by the protagonist, Master Chief, and was designed and manufactured by Misriah Armory, a manufacturer for the United Nations Space Command. Called one of the most infamous video game weapons of all time, it has gained notoriety amongst critics and players for its unusually high power and accuracy, especially for the time it is received in the game. The pistol, or variants of it, appeared in several games in the series, starting in Halo: Combat Evolved, as well as in related media.

== Characteristics ==
The M6D Pistol is constructed out of steel and has a hard chrome finish. It is equipped with an integral 1.2x scope, is recoil-operated and magazine-fed, and utilizes 12.7×40mm rounds (which is close to the .500 S&W Magnum round). The M6D in particular is an "up-sized" version created for use by SPARTANs, and can be integrated with a reticule projected into the HUD of the MJOLNIR Powered Assault Armor/Mark V, as well as being used as an officer's model.

== Appearances ==
In Halo: Combat Evolved, Master Chief first obtains the M6D Pistol from Captain Keyes right before he crashes the Pillar of Autumn starship into the megastructure known as Installation 04.

== Development ==
The M6D Pistol's unusually high power was rumored to have been caused by a last-minute change in the game's code by Bungie co-founder Jason Jones that secretly increased the weapon's damage range. This was later confirmed in an IGN interview, with Jones stating that the pistol's balance "wasn't where we wanted it to be" shortly before release, and while changing the game's data was not feasible, he added code to "change a single number on the pistol" when each game map was loaded. Jones stated that he would "take the credit and blame for the pistol in Halo", calling the tweak due to his attention to smaller details.

In Halo 2, the pistol was replaced by the M6C, which had decreased power and lacked scope functionality. This was described as necessary by Chris King, the lead sandbox designer of Halo 5: Guardians, due to the ability to dual wield pistols, as if two of the original pistols could be wielded together, they would be "total madness". In Halo 3, the pistol was changed from fast to slow-firing, but made more powerful to compensate. In Halo 5, the pistol was again made more similar to the original incarnation in Halo: Combat Evolved. A February 2016 update to Halo 5 added in a recreation of the original "Halo: CE Pistol".

== Reception ==
Seth Macy of IGN called the M6D Pistol the greatest weapon in Halo history, stating that it was most famous for its "three-shot kills", which would kill an enemy with three shots to the head even when shielded. As "the most-feared weapon" in Combat Evolved as well as "the defining element of Halo LAN parties", the M6D placed ninety second place on IGN's Top 100 Video Game Weapons list. Natalie Clayton of PC Gamer singled out the pistol as "practically legendary" due to its "deadly-accurate headshots", but criticized its implementation for "throwing weapon balance out the window, especially on PC", comparing it to Halo: Reach's DMR as one of the only guns the player will need to win. Luke McKinney described the M6D as the "upgrade to Dirty Harry's gun plus half a millennium of polishing", and that the pistol's "overwhelmingly effective" utility increases even further when dual-wielded with a plasma pistol. Kotaku consider the M6D pistol one of the best video game handguns, noting that "there's this split second of lag between firing and hitting that gives it a satisfying crunch that hitscan weapons in other games can't replicate".

Jason Johnson of Kill Screen called the M6D "the most infamous video game weapon of them all", describing it as a "one-holy piece of weaponry" but criticizing its decrease in power after the original Halo, saying it was "reinvented as common trash". Josh West of GamesRadar+ called the "overpowered" M6D Pistol an "eleventh-hour change" that resulted in "chaos". Alexa Ray Corriea of Polygon and Andrew Clouther from GameZone agreed with the consensus that the M6D is "overpowered"; Corriea remarked that the pistol is "infamous", and Clouther said the pistol truly shined in multiplayer, where fully shielded players could be taken down via headshots with relatively ease. On the other hand, Joe Felder claimed in a 2003 article written for GameSpot that the M6D is "voted the weapon that's most likely to be discarded", and only becomes useful once the player has depleted ammo for their other weapons.

Andrew Liszewski and James Whitbrook of Gizmodo criticized the line of Halo-themed Nerf toys for a dart pistol based on the series' SPNKR Rocket Launcher, saying that its design was "perplexing" due to the fact that "the franchise literally already has one of the most iconic pistols in video games".
