= Wide load =

Wide load or wideload refers to:

- Oversize load
- Wideload Games, a video games development studio
