= Stubbs the Zombie in Rebel Without a Pulse =

2005 video game

- Developer: Wideload
- Publishers: Aspyr Media; THQ Nordic (remastered)
- Designer: Alex Seropian
- Composer: Michael Salvatori
- Engine: Blam Engine
- Platforms: Xbox, Mac OS X, Microsoft Windows, Nintendo Switch, PlayStation 4, PlayStation 5, Xbox One, Xbox Series X/S
- Release: Xbox: NA: October 18, 2005; EU: February 10, 2006; Windows: NA: November 21, 2005; EU: February 10, 2006; Mac OS X: NA: November 22, 2005; Nintendo Switch, PS4, PS5, Xbox One, Xbox Series X/S: WW: March 16, 2021
- Genre: Action-adventure
- Modes: Single-player, multiplayer

Stubbs the Zombie in Rebel Without a Pulse is a reverse horror action-adventure video game developed by Wideload Games and published by Aspyr Media. It was released on October 18, 2005 for the Xbox and in November for Microsoft Windows and Mac OS X. It was released on February 10, 2006 in Europe with distribution handled by THQ. The game became available on Microsoft's Xbox Live Marketplace as an Xbox Originals in May 2008 but was removed in late 2012 due to technical issues.

Set in a retro-futuristic version of 1959, the game follows Stubbs who rises from his grave as a zombie with an insatiable hunger for the brains of the inhabitants of the fictional Pennsylvania city of Punchbowl, while pinning for lost love Maggie Monday.

The game was a moderate success garnering favorable reviews and sales for the Xbox version. A sequel was planned, but since Wideload's closing in 2014, it has been since declared canceled. A remastered version of the game was published by THQ Nordic and released for PC (via Steam), PlayStation 4, PlayStation 5, Nintendo Switch, Xbox One and Xbox Series X/S in March 2021, featuring modernized controls and achievements/trophies.

== Gameplay ==
In Stubbs the Zombie, the player plays as a zombie, and the primary goal is to kill humans and devour their brains. Eating brains gives back a certain amount of lost health to the player as well as converting those humans into zombies, causing them to fight alongside the player. The player has the option of beating an enemy to death with melee strikes or to transform them into zombies. Stubbs' zombie state prevents him from wielding any conventional weapons, and instead wields a variety of improvised weaponry and combat techniques, most of which are done using a specific body part as explosives or makeshift devices. Stubbs can drive a wide variety of vehicles, such as cars, tractors and tanks. All of the aforementioned improvised weapons, excluding Stubbs' hand, will convert enemies they kill into zombies. Stubbs can herd zombies which are in range by whistling. Since there is a limit to how many zombies will follow him at a time, Stubbs can guide the rest by sending whole groups of zombies in a direction with a single shove. Stubbs' zombie followers can kill humans and eat their brains, just like Stubbs can, and any human killed by one of his minions will also turn into a zombie. An enemy that fires upon a zombie in a group will attract the attention of all the rest of the zombies. Crowds of zombies can serve as a shield when approaching enemies armed with ranged weapons and are needed for sowing the necessary chaos and confusion into a difficult melee.

Different enemies have different abilities, health pools and weapons for dispatching Stubbs, civilians typically have no weapons or may have the occasional melee weapons, have low health, are quite cowardly and can be grabbed by the front regardless of their health, whereas other enemies need to be hit and dazed before Stubbs is able to eat their brains from the front, though he can eat their brains from behind if they are unaware of Stubbs or distracted by other zombies.

== Setting ==
Punchbowl is a retro-futuristic city that resembles the future as portrayed by the media in the 1950s. It includes hovercars, laser weaponry, a monorail, and robots. Punchbowl was envisioned and funded by Andrew Monday and created by his teams of scientists, led by former Nazi scientist Dr. Hermann Wye.

== Plot ==
In 1959, Andrew Monday, multi-billionaire playboy industrialist, who was said to have been found in a picnic basket by his mother Maggie, has built the futuristic utopian city of Punchbowl, in Pennsylvania. During its opening ceremony, deceased traveling salesman, Edward "Stubbs" Stubblefield, rises from his grave as a Zombie and begins to consume the brains of Punchbowl's inhabitants, quickly creating his own army of the undead, and causing increasing amounts of havoc as the Zombies clash with the various militant factions of the area. Stubbs is searching for answers as to who killed him and why, though he seems to have an inordinate infatuation for Andrew Monday's mother, Maggie. Stubbs heads to The Punchbowl Police Station where he is captured and the police chief plans to dance on Stubbs' grave. Stubbs manages to escape by ripping his hand off and using it to control a scientist to release his restraints. Stubbs makes his way to the chief's office where they have a dance-off before the chief dances to the armory, unaware he has Stubbs' pancreas stuck to him; it explodes, killing him.

As Stubbs continues his path of destruction, he comes across Otis, the prospective, paranoid, trigger-happy leader of a local redneck militia called "The Quaker State Irregulars" who believes the Zombie outbreak is part of a Communist infiltration mission. Stubbs follows Otis back to his farm where he gives a rousing speech (consisting of only the word "Brains" in various cadences) to his fellow Zombies in a parody of the war film Patton. Upon cornering Otis, Stubbs seems to be at a disadvantage, as Otis has prepared a large stockpile of TNT which he intends to detonate. Before he can light it, Otis seems to recognize Stubbs from when he was alive and begins to panic. This gives Stubbs the chance to grab the match and light the TNT himself, escaping to a safe distance before the house is blown up, with Otis inside. He then rides a flustered sheep back to Punchbowl.

Stubbs goes to the dam where he relieves his bladder by urinating in the town's water supply, contaminating it. He then causes the dam to explode by having the other Zombies use themselves as electrical conduits. The flash flood of contaminated water worsens the zombie outbreak and brings Stubbs back into the city limits, where the U.S. Army has arrived to dispatch the zombies. Stubbs eventually reaches Herman Wye’s laboratory, where Wye himself reveals he unwittingly created Stubbs via an experimental growth serum that he used for accelerating the growth of grass in Punchbowl. He also declares his intent to use Stubbs as a specimen for his research. After a difficult battle, Stubbs manages to defeat Wye.

Upon arriving at City Hall to confront Andrew, Maggie recognizes the zombie and stops Andrew from shooting him, proclaiming her love for Stubbs. She explains that in 1933, during The Great Depression, she was a young country girl living at her family's farm. Stubbs, a down-on-his-luck salesman trying to eke out a living, had an unbroken streak of bad luck dating back to his birth (he couldn't sell ice cream in the Sahara and could not sell life insurance during the darkest days of the depression). One hot summer night, Stubbs arrived at Maggie's house in an attempt to do business. Finding him charming, Maggie took Stubbs back to her room where the two had sex. Maggie's father, Otis, came home and caught the two together. Unbeknownst to Maggie, Otis had killed Stubbs and buried him in an unmarked grave in the remote Pennsylvania countryside (in the same spot where Punchbowl would later be built). Maggie reveals that she became pregnant with Andrew from the experience, making Stubbs his biological father. The two share a romantic embrace, which is abruptly cut short by Stubbs eating her brain. Enraged by this and the truth of his conception, Andrew attacks Stubbs from behind a forcefield. Stubbs destroys the force field and looms toward Andrew, but Maggie, now a zombie, convinces him to spare their son. As Stubbs and Maggie sail off in a small rowboat and kiss, Andrews rushes outside and looks up to the sky just as Punchbowl is destroyed by a nuclear strike in an effort to contain the outbreak. During the credits, photos of things that happened during the events of the game are shown on the left.

== Development ==
Stubbs the Zombie was Wideload Games' first game after its founding. The company's founder, Alex Seropian had previously co-founded and worked with Bungie and used the production as an experiment to determine how he would run an independent studio. The game's development began with a team of twelve, but Seropian decided to use contractors which raised the number to sixty. This decision brought difficulties when the hiring process wasn't properly overseen, leaving the team with a shortage of producers and lack of cohesion. A game development model was developed, with 12 full-time employees overseeing pre and post production phases, while independent contractors worked with the remaining content. Using the Halo engine provided some problem in the early stages. The engine was completely developed by Bungie and it lacked notes from them or peer reviews that would emphasize possible programming problems. Due to this, an excessive amount of time was spent determining which contractors would require training to use the engine, as well as how long they would receive instruction.

From the onset, the game's concept intended to innovate the horror genre by letting the player play as a zombie. Seropian claims that the team intended to take "something that people are familiar with" and turn it "upside down." The game was intended to contrast with what was regarded as the general idea of zombie games, changing the "straightforward good guys versus zombies" format found in games like Resident Evil. Humor became a key aspect during the developmental stage, with Seropian claiming that the team wanted to go "beyond just amusing dialogue in a cut-scene". Character dialogue and game mechanics were designed so that "funny results" are directly based on the player's action, preventing them from becoming repetitive or stale.

== Reception ==
Reception

Aggregate scores
Aggregator	Score	
Aggregator	PC	Xbox
GameRankings	71%	76%
Metacritic	72/100	75/100

Review scores
Publication	Score	
Publication	PC	Xbox
Edge	N/A	6/10
Electronic Gaming Monthly	N/A	8.67/10
Eurogamer	N/A	4/10
Game Informer	N/A	8/10
GamePro	N/A	3.5/5
GameRevolution	N/A	B−
GameSpot	7.7/10	7.8/10
GameSpy	N/A	4/5
GameZone	N/A	7.6/10
IGN	7.5/10	8.1/10
Official Xbox Magazine (US)	N/A	8/10
PC Gamer (US)	77%	N/A
Detroit Free Press	N/A	4/4
The Sydney Morning Herald	3.5/5	3.5/5

The Xbox version received "generally favorable reviews", while the PC version received "average" reviews, according to video game review aggregator Metacritic. Eurogamer claimed that the Xbox version had "lots of reasonable ideas that don't quite work" and "a general lack of cohesion".

The game was perceived as "painfully short" and "linear", but "never boring". The game's environments were described as "nicely varied", noting that "places like Punchbowl, the city of the future, are extremely well designed and appropriately cool looking." The game's soundtrack received predominantly positive reviews. The character's voice acting was described as the element that "set the game apart", to the point of claiming that "Never before have the sounds of zombie moaning been done so well in a game." IGN emphasized the "futile cries from civilians and armed foes" and "squishy, scalp-munching sound effects" as elements contributing to a higher quality than the game's visuals.

Detroit Free Press gave the Xbox version a score of all four stars, saying, "The chaos that ensues is as lighthearted as a blood-soaked zombiefest can be." CiN Weekly gave the same version a score of 78% and said, "Sure, it's not the most action-packed or finely tuned game, but there are enough clever attacks and humorous elements in Pulse to keep you playing through to see what other goodies - or appendages - they'll toss your way." However, The Sydney Morning Herald gave the game three-and-a-half stars out of five and called it "a brief ride and the action can become repetitive, but the sharp humour keeps you smiling."

Stubbs the character was ranked second on EGM's Top Ten Badass Undead.

The editors of Computer Games Magazine presented Stubbs the Zombie with their 2005 "Best Soundtrack" award.

=== Cannibalism controversy ===
Stubbs the Zombie, along with F.E.A.R., encountered controversy in November 2005 regarding cannibalism in games. NIMF's David Walsh and U.S. Senator Joe Lieberman also criticized the game as "cannibalistic" and harmful to underage children. Senator Lieberman stated "It's just the worst kind of message to kids, and furthermore it can harm the entirety of America's youth". Wideload Games responded by saying that Stubbs is a zombie, not a human cannibal. GamePolitics also chided the report, calling it "ridiculous" and citing 36 mainstream news outlets had picked the story immediately after the NIMF report.

== Soundtrack ==
Stubbs the Zombie: The Soundtrack

Soundtrack album by various artists
- Released: October 18, 2005
- Genres: Rock and roll, Pop
- Length: 38:19
- Label: Shout! Factory

The soundtrack to Stubbs features covers of '50s and '60s-era songs performed by popular and up-and-coming alternative rock artists.

Stubbs the Zombie: The Soundtrack
No.	Title	Writer(s)	Artist	Length
1.	"Lollipop"	Beverly "Ruby" Ross / Julius Edward Dixon	Ben Kweller	2:15
2.	"My Boyfriend's Back"	Bob Feldman / Jerry Goldstein / Richard Gottehrer	The Raveonettes	2:38
3.	"Earth Angel"	Curtis "Fitz" Williams / Gaynel Hodge / Jesse Belvin	Death Cab for Cutie	3:16
4.	"Shakin' All Over"	Johnny Kidd	Rose Hill Drive	2:52
5.	"Strangers in the Night"	Bert Kaempfert / Charlie Singleton / Eddie Snyder	Cake	2:51
6.	"There Goes My Baby"	Benjamin Nelson / George Treadwell / Lover Patterson	The Walkmen	2:16
7.	"Everyday"	Buddy Holly / Norman Petty	Rogue Wave	3:40
8.	"All I Have to Do Is Dream"	Boudleaux Bryant / Felice Bryant	The Dandy Warhols	2:39
9.	"Mr. Sandman"	Pat Ballard	Oranger	3:02
10.	"If I Only Had a Brain"	Yip Harburg / Harold Arlen	The Flaming Lips	2:16
11.	"Tears on My Pillow"	Al Lewis / Sylvester Bradford	Clem Snide	4:01
12.	"Lonesome Town"	Thomas Baker-Knight	Milton Mapes	3:07
13.	"The Living Dead"	Alex Greenwald	Phantom Planet	3:26
