= Minotaur: The Labyrinths of Crete =

1992 video game

- Developer: Bungie
- Publisher: Bungie
- Designer: Jason Jones
- Platform: Mac OS
- Release: 1992
- Genres: Role-playing, adventure
- Modes: Single-player, multiplayer

Minotaur: The Labyrinths of Crete is a 1992 role-playing adventure video game for Macintosh by Bungie; produced by Jason Jones and Alex Seropian.

== Gameplay ==
The game distinguished itself from other games of its time by including a multiplayer mode that functioned over the AppleTalk protocol or Point-to-Point Protocol. A single-player exploration mode was also available, but this mode had no end goal and was useful to discover how the various items found in the maze operated.

== Publication history ==
The game originated in 1988 as an Apple II game played over a modem between two opponents, but was never officially released on that platform.

The game's tagline was "Kill your enemies. Kill your friends' enemies. Kill your friends". This tagline has reappeared as a description in the multiplayer menu screens for some of Bungie's other games, such as Myth: The Fallen Lords and Halo 3.

Bungie later licensed Minotaur's game engine to the studio Paranoid Productions (Richard Rouse) who used it to create Odyssey: The Legend of Nemesis, released in 1996.

== Reception ==
Computer Gaming World favorably reviewed Minotaur, although criticizing it not using the mouse and lack of a single-player option, concluding that "a group of dedicated opponents [who] enjoy fast-thinking and ad-lib strategizing will find long-lasting enjoyment from this game". The game was reviewed in 1992 in Dragon #188 by Hartley, Patricia, and Kirk Lesser in "The Role of Computers" column. The reviewers gave the game 4 out of 5 stars. The game sold 2,500 copies.

== See also ==
- Pathways into Darkness, originally to be a sequel to this game
