= Milton Mapes =

- Origin: Austin, Texas
- Genres: Folk rock, country rock, roots rock
- Years active: 1999-2006
- Label: Undertow
- Website: miltonmapes.com

Milton Mapes is a band that formed in Austin, Texas in 1999. The band was named after band member Greg Vanderpool's grandfather.

Singer/guitarist Greg Vanderpool and bandmate Roberto Sánchez, both veterans of Dallas’ Deep Ellum music scene, subsequently spent a year in Nashville compiling songs that would make up Milton Mapes' debut release The State Line (2001). The 7-song CD was well received by regional press and radio, drawing comparisons to Neil Young (Harvest) and Bruce Springsteen (Nebraska).

Milton Mapes eventually evolved into a complete band with the addition of Britton Beisenherz, Cliff Brown Jr., Chris Dye, and Jim Fredley, homing in closer on an atmospheric revival of Young's Crazy Horse or Bob Dylan's electric conversion. While maintaining their roots under layered guitars and textures, the band knew the power of understatement—often allowing the quiet moments of a song to shine as brightly as the loud ones. The band released Westernaire (Aspyr Media) in 2003, reflecting this migration with a heavy dose of guitar-oriented songs. Sounding much less "country" than the title might suggest, Westernaire explored themes of 'the unknown', love, and alcohol—painting with rock-and-roll a hazy landscape that holds more questions than answers.

The band toured through much of the United States since the recording of Westernaire, appearing both as a duo and as a full band. The group shared bills with an assortment of its respected Texas contemporaries and touring acts such as Magnolia Electric Co., Cowboy Junkies, Chris Whitley, Willie Nelson, and The Handsome Family.

Milton Mapes released its third album, The Blacklight Trap, on March 8, 2005 on the Undertow label, touring in support of the album throughout much of the Spring and Summer.

The Blacklight Trap was released in Europe on Decor Records in October 2005. The band also released an EP collection of B-Sides and Outtakes from The Blacklight Trap entitled Shady Valleys in late 2005.

The band recorded a cover version of "Lonesome Town" for the covers compilation soundtrack released in support of video game Stubbs the Zombie in 2005.

In 2006, the band regrouped to reflect their changing dynamics and was reformed as Monahans, and have since recorded four albums (Low Pining, Dim the Aurora, Leveler and Roam An Empty Space) under the new moniker.

In 2010, Robert Plant covered their song "The Only Sound That Matters" from the album Westernaire on his album entitled Band of Joy.
