= Wideload Games =

American video game developer

- Type: Subsidiary
- Industry: Video games
- Founded: 2003; 23 years ago
- Founder: Alexander Seropian
- Defunct: March 6, 2014; 12 years ago
- Fate: Shut down
- Headquarters: Chicago, Illinois, U.S.
- Parent: Disney Interactive Studios

Wideload Games was an American video game developer located in Chicago, Illinois. It was founded in 2003 by Alexander Seropian—the co-founder of Bungie and head behind the games Halo: Combat Evolved, Myth, and Marathon—and six other former Bungie employees three years after Bungie's acquisition by Microsoft Corporation.

Wideload focused on a core team and many external developers in developing games. The goal was to counteract the growing development costs associated with the current game industry, and to prove that smaller companies with relatively modest funds could make a game that could still sell well compared to releases from larger corporations.

Wideload's first project was Stubbs the Zombie in Rebel Without a Pulse, a 3D-action-adventure game in which the player takes control of the zombie Stubbs in a plot filled with black humor. It was published in fall 2005 for Macintosh, Microsoft Windows-PCs, and Xbox by Aspyr.

Their sophomore project, Hail to the Chimp, was released June 23, 2008 by Gamecock Media Group for seventh-generation consoles. Additionally, Wideload released information on their newer group, Wideload Shorts. Wideload Shorts specialized in developing smaller-scale games for services such as Xbox Live Arcade. Their first game from Wideload Shorts, Cyclomite, was released in March 2008 on the InstantAction game platform.

Wideload Games was acquired on September 8, 2009, by The Walt Disney Company. Under the Disney Interactive name, Wideload would develop original video game properties for Disney. They developed Guilty Party. After Disney Interactive underwent corporate restructuring, Wideload was reassigned to make mobile games, beginning with Avengers Initiative, featuring Marvel superheroes.

Wideload Games was officially shut down by Disney on March 6, 2014.
