= Hail to the Chimp =

2008 video game

- North American cover
- Developer: Wideload Games
- Publisher: Gamecock Media Group
- Composer: Michael Salvatori
- Engine: Unreal Engine 3
- Platforms: PlayStation 3, Xbox 360
- Release: NA: June 24, 2008
- Genre: Party
- Modes: Single-player, multiplayer

Hail to the Chimp is a party video game developed by Wideload Games and published by Gamecock Media Group. It was released in 2008 for the PlayStation 3 and Xbox 360.

== Gameplay ==
Up to four players compete as anthropomorphic animals in a variety of mini-games while vying for the role of "President of the Animal Kingdom". By competing in mini-game tournaments named Primaries, the players will collect clams that make the characters stronger, and complete different objectives at the same time. The one who gets the most votes will win the election. Clams are designed to be used in several ways as an all-around currency, whether by shooting them, giving out as donations or exchanging for other things like election signs or money.

== Reception ==
Reception

Aggregate score
Aggregator	Score	
Aggregator	PS3	Xbox 360
Metacritic	51/100	52/100

Review scores
Publication	Score	
Publication	PS3	Xbox 360
1Up.com	N/A	B+
Destructoid	N/A	4/10
Edge	7/10	N/A
Game Informer	4/10	4/10
GamePro	3/5	3/5
GameSpot	N/A	5.5/10
GameZone	6/10	N/A
IGN	3.5/10	3.5/10
Official Xbox Magazine (US)	N/A	7/10
PlayStation: The Official Magazine	2.5/5	N/A
Maxim	6/10	6/10
Variety	N/A	(unfavorable)

The game received "mixed" reviews according to the review aggregation website Metacritic.
