= Halo 2 =

2004 video game

- Developer: Bungie (Note: Additional work on the Windows version was done by Microsoft Game Studios and Pi Studios.)
- Publisher: Microsoft Game Studios
- Writer: Joseph Staten
- Composers: Martin O'Donnell; Michael Salvatori
- Series: Halo
- Platforms: Xbox; Windows
- Release: November 9, 2004: Xbox; AU/NA: November 9, 2004; EU: November 11, 2004 Windows; AU: May 17, 2007; NA: May 31, 2007; EU: June 8, 2007
- Genre: First-person shooter
- Modes: Single-player, multiplayer

Halo 2 is a 2004 first-person shooter game developed by Bungie and published by Microsoft Game Studios for the Xbox. The second installment in the Halo franchise, the campaign follows the supersoldier Master Chief and the disgraced alien commander Arbiter in a 26th-century conflict between the United Nations Space Command, the genocidal Covenant, and the parasitic Flood.

After the success of Halo: Combat Evolved (2001), a sequel was expected and highly anticipated. Bungie found inspiration in plot points and gameplay elements that had been left out of their first game, including online multiplayer. A troubled development and time constraints forced cuts to the scope, including the removal of a more ambitious multiplayer mode, and necessitated a cliffhanger ending to the campaign mode. Among Halo 2's marketing was an early alternate reality game, "I Love Bees", that involved players solving real-world puzzles. The gameplay is similar to its predecessor, while featuring new weapons, enemies, vehicles, and gameplay elements, most notably dual wielding certain weapons. Online multiplayer was available via Microsoft's Xbox Live service.

Halo 2 was a critical and commercial success and is widely considered one of the greatest video games of all time. It became the most popular game on Xbox Live, holding that rank until the release of Gears of War for the Xbox 360 nearly two years later. Halo 2 is the best-selling Xbox game, with more than 8 million copies sold worldwide. It received widespread acclaim, with the multiplayer, audiovisual design, and soundtrack receiving particular praise, while the campaign and its cliffhanger ending were divisive. Halo 2's multiplayer mode was highly influential, and it cemented many features as industry standard in future games and online services, including matchmaking, lobbies, and clans. Halo 2's marketing heralded the beginnings of video games as blockbuster media. After the release, Bungie released additional multiplayer maps and updates to address cheating and glitches. Halo 3 was released in 2007. Halo 2 was ported to Windows Vista in 2007, followed by a high-definition remaster for the Xbox One as part of Halo: The Master Chief Collection in 2014.

== Gameplay ==
In-game screenshot of Halo 2 for Xbox; the player character aims a shotgun at enemy Covenant.

Like its predecessor, Halo 2 is a shooter game. Players primarily experience gameplay from a first-person perspective, with the viewpoint shifting to third-person for vehicle segments. Players use a combination of human and Covenant weaponry and vehicles to progress through the levels. Certain weapons can be dual-wielded, allowing the player to trade accuracy, the use of grenades, and melee attacks for raw firepower. The player can carry two weapons at a time (or three if dual-wielding, with one weapon remaining holstered), with each weapon having strengths in different combat situations. Most Covenant weapons, for example, overheat if fired continuously and eschew disposable ammo magazines for an internal battery, which cannot be replaced once depleted. Human weapons are less effective at penetrating shields and require reloading ammunition, but cannot overheat due to prolonged fire. Players can hijack enemy vehicles and quickly assume control of them. The player is equipped with a damage-absorbing shield that regenerates when not taking fire; their health bar is not visible.

The "Campaign" mode offers options for both single-player and cooperative multiplayer participation. In campaign mode, the player must complete a series of levels that encompass Halo 2's storyline. These levels alternate between the Master Chief and a Covenant Elite called the Arbiter, who occupy diametrically opposed roles in the story's conflict. Aside from variations in storyline, the Arbiter differs from Master Chief only in that his armor lacks a flashlight; instead, it is equipped with a short duration rechargeable form of active camouflage that disappears when the player attacks or takes damage. There are four difficulty levels in campaign mode: Easy, Normal, Heroic, and Legendary. An increase in difficulty will result in an increase in the number, rank, health, damage, and accuracy of enemies; a reduction of duration and an increase in recharge time for the Arbiter's active camouflage; a decrease in the player's health and shields; and occasional changes in dialogue. Enemy and friendly artificial intelligence is dynamic, and replaying the same encounters repeatedly will demonstrate different behavior.

Like Halo: Combat Evolved, the Xbox version of Halo 2 features a multiplayer system that allows players to compete with each other in split-screen and system link modes; in addition, it added support for online multiplayer via Xbox Live. Instead of implementing multiplayer by having players manually join lobbies, as was common in games at the time, Halo 2 used matchmaking. Players chose the general type of match they want to play, and the game selected the map and gametype and automatically found other players. This "playlist" system automated the process of finding matches to keep a steady flow of games available at all times, and combined a skill-ranking system on top.

The Xbox Live multiplayer and downloadable content features of the Xbox version of Halo 2 were supported until the discontinuation of the service in April 2010, with the final multiplayer session concluding May 10, almost a month after the service was officially terminated. Multiplayer for the PC version used Games for Windows – Live. The PC multiplayer servers were taken offline in June 2013. Online servers for the original Xbox version were made available again with an unofficial service, Insignia, in 2024.

== Synopsis ==
=== Setting ===
Halo 2 takes place in the 26th century. Humanity, under the auspices of the United Nations Space Command or UNSC, has developed faster-than-light slipspace travel and colonized numerous worlds. Human worlds come under attack by a collective of alien races known as the Covenant. Declaring humanity an affront to their gods, the Forerunners, the Covenant begin to obliterate the humans with their superior numbers and technology. After the human planet Reach is destroyed, a single ship, The Pillar of Autumn, follows protocol and initiates a random slipspace jump to lead the Covenant away from Earth. The crew discovers a Forerunner ringworld called Halo. Though the Covenant believe Halo's activation will lead to divine salvation, the humans discover that the rings are actually weapons of last resort, built by the Forerunners to contain a terrifying parasite called the Flood. The human supersoldier Master Chief Petty Officer John-117 and his AI companion Cortana learn from Halo's AI monitor, 343 Guilty Spark, that activation of the Halos will destroy all sentient life in the galaxy to prevent the Flood's spread. Instead of activating the ring, Master Chief and Cortana detonate the Pillar of Autumn's engines, destroying the installation and preventing the escape of the Flood. Master Chief and Cortana race back to Earth to warn of an impending invasion by Covenant forces.

=== Plot ===
Halo 2 opens with the trial of a Covenant Elite commander aboard the Covenant's capital city-ship of High Charity. For his failure to stop Halo's destruction, the Elite is stripped of his rank, branded a heretic, and tortured by Tartarus, the Chieftain of the Covenant Brutes. Spared from his execution, the Covenant leadership—the High Prophets Truth and Mercy—give the Elite the chance to become an Arbiter, a rank given to Elites in times of great crisis or turmoil. As the Arbiter, the Elite quells a rebellion and recovers 343 Guilty Spark.

On Earth, Fleet Admiral Hood commends the Master Chief and Sergeant Avery Johnson for their actions at the first Halo, with Commander Miranda Keyes accepting a medal on behalf of her deceased father, Captain Jacob Keyes. A Covenant fleet suddenly appears near Earth. In the ensuing battle, a single ship carrying the High Prophet of Regret slips through Earth's defenses and besieges the African city of New Mombasa. Master Chief assists in repelling the invasion. With his fleet destroyed, Regret makes a hasty slipspace jump, and Keyes, Johnson, Cortana, and the Master Chief follow aboard the UNSC ship In Amber Clad. The crew discovers another Halo installation; realizing the danger the ring presents, Keyes sends Master Chief to kill Regret while she and Johnson search for the Index, Halo's activation key.

Responding to Regret's distress call, High Charity and the Covenant fleet arrive at the Halo. After Master Chief kills Regret, the Covenant bombard his location; he falls into a lake, unconscious, and is dragged away by tentacles. Regret's death triggers discord among the races of the Covenant, as the Prophets give the Brutes the Elites' traditional role as their honor guard. The Arbiter subdues Johnson and Keyes and retrieves the Index. Tartarus appears and reveals that the Prophets have ordered the annihilation of the Elites, and sends the Arbiter falling down a deep chasm.

The Arbiter meets the Master Chief in the bowels of the Halo, brought together by a Flood creature called the Gravemind. The Gravemind reveals to the Arbiter that the Great Journey is a lie, and sends the two soldiers to different places to stop Halo's activation. The Master Chief is teleported to High Charity as the Covenant falls into civil war. The Flood-infested In Amber Clad crashes into the city, and Cortana realizes that the Gravemind used them as a distraction. As the parasite overruns the city, the Prophet of Mercy is consumed. As for Tartarus, the Prophet of Truth consigns him to Halo with Keyes, Johnson, and Guilty Spark to activate the ring. Master Chief follows Truth aboard a Forerunner ship leaving the city; Cortana remains behind to destroy High Charity and Halo if Tartarus succeeds in activating the ring.

On the surface of Halo, the Arbiter joins forces with Johnson and confronts Tartarus in Halo's control room. When the Arbiter tries to convince Tartarus that the Prophets have betrayed them, Tartarus instead activates the ring, and a battle ensues. The Arbiter and Johnson kill Tartarus while Keyes removes the Index; the unexpected deactivation sets Halo and all the other rings on standby for remote activation from a place 343 Guilty Spark calls "the Ark." Meanwhile, Truth's ship arrives at Earth, and Master Chief informs Admiral Hood that he is "finishing this fight." In a post-credits scene, Gravemind assumes control of High Charity. Cortana agrees to answer the Flood intelligence's questions.

== Development ==
Halo had not been planned as a trilogy, but its critical and commercial success —selling more than five million copies in three years—made a sequel expected. Xbox general manager J Allard confirmed Halo 2 was in production at Electronic Entertainment Expo 2002, with a planned release in time for Holiday 2003.

Many at Bungie wanted to make a sequel, building on cut ideas from Halo: Combat Evolved with a more ambitious follow-up. The added publisher support for a sequel allowed greater leeway and the ability to return to more ambitious ideas lost during the development of Halo: Combat Evolved. Not satisfied with merely restoring cut content, designer Jaime Griesemer recalled that the team "tripled everything", rebuilding the game engine, changing the physics engine, and prototyping a system for stencil shadow volumes. The development suffered from a lack of clear leadership. Early development discussions happened in small, unconnected teams that did not talk with each other. Bungie cofounder and project lead Jason Jones, who had been exhausted shipping Halo: Combat Evolved, was similarly burned out during Halo 2's production. Jones left to work on another Bungie game, Phoenix, leaving fewer people to work on Halo 2. The departure of Bungie's cofounder Alex Seropian in 2002 caused additional friction and politics in the workplace where Seropian had once mediated tensions. Artist Robert McLees recalled that Bungie had never had good managers, with creatives simultaneously juggling managerial roles. "This kinda worked when there were 12 of us. It worked less well when there were 30 of us. It collapsed when there were 60 of us," he said later.

Writer Joseph Staten described the team's ambitions:

Then we just plowed ahead, much like we'd done with Halo, with one notable exception. We ordered ourselves a giant sandwich, took a bite but didn't realize exactly how big it was before we started in. And we did that across the board, technically, artistically, and story wise. But of course, we didn't figure that out until way too late.

Griesemer said: "What's the phrase? Putting ten pounds of crap into a five-pound bag? We really tried to cram it too full, and we paid the price." Lack of communication led to some team members spending time developing assets or content that was duplicative or wasted. McLees recalled he spent two weeks developing a weapon that was cut.

An important feature for Halo 2 was multiplayer using Xbox Live. Multiplayer in Halo was accomplished via System Link and had nearly been scrapped altogether in the rush to complete the game. Most players never played large maps, while a subset greatly enjoyed 16-player action, connecting consoles together with network cables for group play. "We looked at the small set of fans who were able to do this," said engineering lead Chris Butcher, "and just how much they were enjoying themselves, and asked ourselves if we could bring that to everybody. That would be something really special, really unique." Initially, the Halo multiplayer was supposed to involve larger maps and player counts, and members of the team wanted to resurrect those plans for Halo 2. The smaller multiplayer modes and local split-screen capabilities of the first game would have been removed. Designer Max Hoberman successfully argued against the removal of a successful component from the previous game. He was put in charge of a small team to further develop the small-scale arena multiplayer, while the rest of the team developed a larger "Warfare" mode. Bungie promised in previews that the core of this multiplayer would be squad-based online battles between human Spartans and Covenant Elites, with players able to call in airstrikes. Hoberman's pitch for Halo 2's arena multiplayer was to bring the fun of couch multiplayer online. As Hoberman was not a skilled game player, he wanted to make sure it remained fun for even lower-skilled players, rather than catering to the competitive ones. The system of playlist matchmaking and allowing friends to "party up" to play games together were crucial to creating a global community of players.

The story for Halo 2 grew out of all the elements that were not seen in Halo. Jason Jones organized his core ideas for the sequel's story and approached Staten for input. According to Staten, among the elements that did not make it to the finished game was a "horrible scene of betrayal" where Miranda Keyes straps a bomb to the Master Chief's back and throws him into a hole in revenge for her father's death; "Jason was going through a rather difficult breakup at the time and I think that had something to do with it," he said. Staten and Griesemer discussed seeing the war from the Covenant perspective, forming the idea to have part of the game told from the perspective of a Covenant warrior known as the Dervish. Late in development, the Dervish became the Arbiter, after legal teams at Microsoft were afraid the game was sending a message about Islam.

In February 2003, Bungie began developing a gameplay demonstration for E3 2003. The demo, which was the first gameplay seen by the public, showcased new enemies and abilities. Many elements of the trailer, however, were not game-ready; the entire graphics engine used in the footage had to be discarded, and the trailer's environment never appeared in the final game due to limitations on the size of environments. Elements like vehicle hijacking were scripted, and to keep performance at an acceptable level, a staff member deleted objects as the player passed through. The restructuring of the engine meant that there was no playable build of Halo 2 for nearly a year, and assets and environments produced by art and design teams could not be prototyped, bottlenecking development. Griesemer recalled that development was "moving backwards", and after E3 the team realized much of what they had worked on for the past two years would need to be scrapped.

Bungie began paring back their ambitions for the single- and multiplayer parts. All other Bungie projects, including Phoenix, were cancelled, with their teams folded into Halo 2. The campaign was completely rethought and remained unplayable for more than a year while the multiplayer was being developed. A third act, in which Master Chief and Arbiter came together on Earth to defeat the Prophets, was cut. Staten hoped the resulting cliffhanger would be treated like the end of The Empire Strikes Back. Planned vehicles, such as variants of the Warthog and an all terrain vehicle, were scrapped.

With the single-player mode in trouble, little had been done with the large Warfare multiplayer mode. Eventually, the mode was cut, and Hoberman's small team project became shipping the multiplayer suite. Engineer Chris Butcher said: "For Halo 2 we had our sights set very high on networking. Going from having no internet multiplayer to developing a completely new online model was a big challenge to tackle all at once, and as a result we had to leave a lot of things undone in order to meet the ship date commitment that we made to our fans."

As one of its tentpole games, Microsoft had two full-time user experience researchers managing a team of game testers working on Halo 2. The researchers used playtests, surveys, and usability testing to gather feedback. Feedback of the matchmaking system was very unfavorable, with the testers preferring the control offered by traditional servers. Researcher John Hopson recalled that while they suggested Bungie should change it, Bungie remained steadfast their new approach would be better in the real world; Hopson later agreed with their choice, saying that his team had only narrowly avoided ruining the game. To test real-world network conditions, Bungie ran a closed alpha of the multiplayer with 1000 Microsoft employees for five weeks.

Outside of Bungie, the success of Halo had become a problem for Halo 2's development, as the success of the Xbox platform was depending on Halo. Microsoft originally pressured Bungie to have it ready as a launch game for Xbox Live in November 2002, which Bungie said was impossible. At one point, Microsoft executives had a vote over whether to force Bungie to ship the incomplete game, or give them another year of development time. Microsoft Studios head Ed Fries walked out of the vote and threatened to resign to get Bungie the extra time.

Missing the Xbox's last holiday season before its successor console, the Xbox 360, shipped was not an option. To hit its new November 9, 2004, release date, Bungie went into the "mother of all crunches". "A lot of people sacrificed themselves in ways that you should never have to for your job," design lead Paul Bertone recalled. He kenneled his dog for nearly two months and slept in the office for the final days of development, while artist Lorraine McLees took her baby to the office after day care ended as she worked the longer hours. Griesemer said that this lack of a "polish" period near the end of the development cycle was the main reason for Halo 2's shortcomings. Butcher retrospectively described Halo 2's multiplayer mode as "a pale shadow of what it could and should have been" due to the tight schedule. About 70 people worked on the game. In late December 2025, an original Xbox build of Halo 2’s E3 2003 demo, along with other early 2003 material and internal development tools, was leaked online.

=== Audio ===
Halo 2's soundtrack was composed primarily by Martin O'Donnell and his musical partner Michael Salvatori, the team that had composed the critically acclaimed music of Halo. O'Donnell noted in composing the music for Halo 2 that "making a sequel is never a simple proposition. You want to make everything that was cool even better, and leave out all the stuff that was weak." O'Donnell made sure that no part would be completely silent, noting "Ambient sound is one of the main ways to immerse people psychologically. A dark room is spooky, but add a creaking floorboard and rats skittering in the walls and it becomes really creepy." Halo 2, unlike its predecessor, was mixed to take full advantage of Dolby 5.1 Digital surround sound.

In the summer of 2004, producer Nile Rodgers and O'Donnell decided to release the music from Halo 2 on two separate CDs. The first, contained all the themes in Halo 2 as well as music "inspired" by it; the second contained the rest of the music from the game, much of which was incomplete, as the first CD was shipped before the game was released. The first CD was released on November 9, 2004, and featured guitar backing by Steve Vai. Additional tracks included various outside musicians, including Steve Vai, Incubus, Breaking Benjamin, and Hoobastank. The Halo 2 Original Soundtrack: Volume Two CD, containing the game music organized in suite form, was released on April 25, 2006.

== Release ==
=== Promotion ===
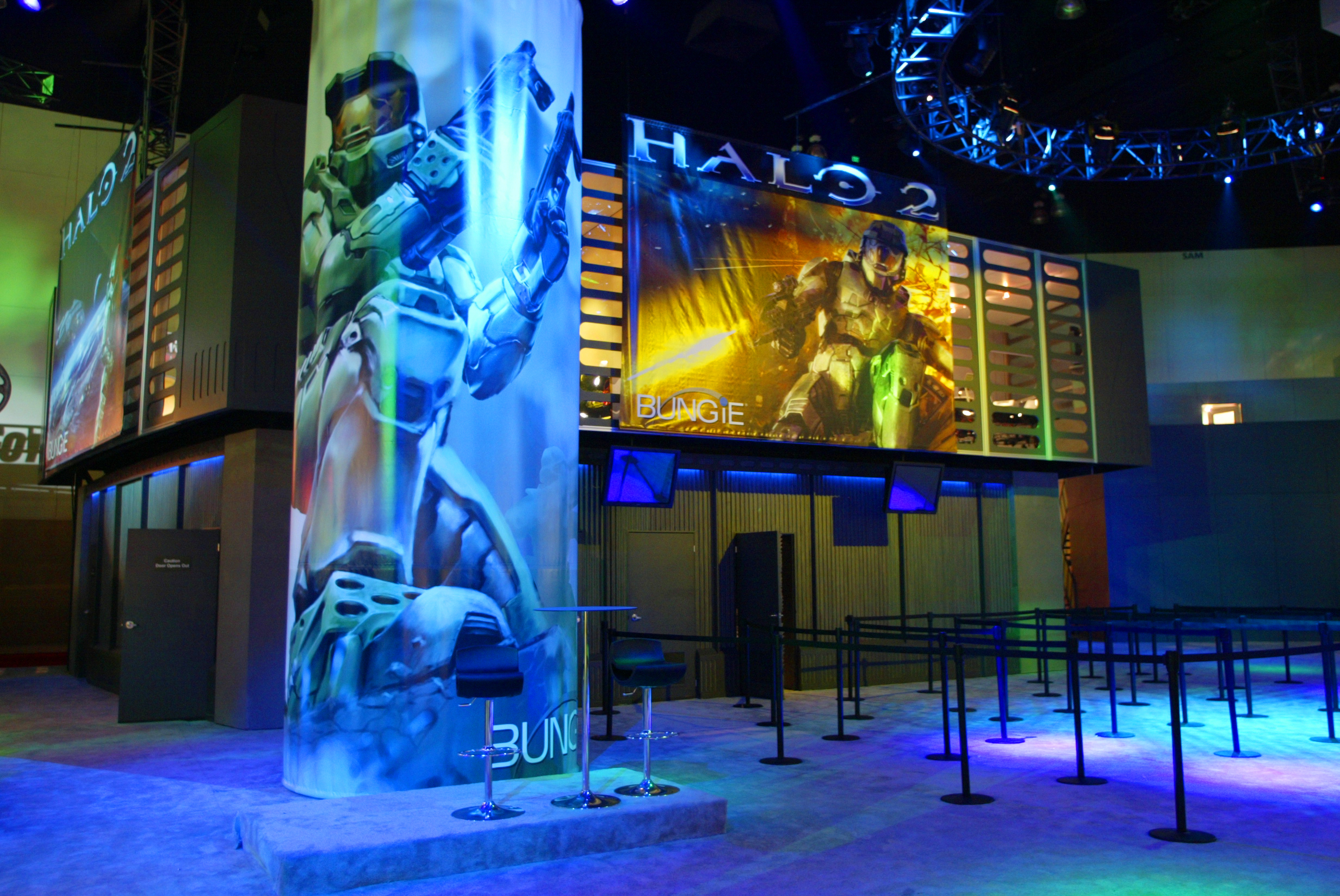
The Xbox booth at E3 2003 at the Los Angeles Convention Center in Los Angeles, California.

Halo 2 was announced in September 2002 with a cinematic trailer, scheduled for a Holiday 2003 release. The first major look came with the E3 2003 demo in May; Halo 2 was Microsoft's strongest showing at the event, and some journalists believed it looked too good to be live gameplay and must have been a scripted cutscene. Halo 2 was delayed to a first-quarter 2004 release, then to holiday 2004. The final November 9 release date was confirmed at E3 2004, where the multiplayer was playable on the show floor. The demo showed off a new map, Zanzibar, an attack/defend capture the flag mode, dual wielding, and vehicle boarding. Microsoft executive Peter Moore rolled up his sleeve to reveal the date tattooed on his bicep.

Contents of the Limited Collector's Edition

Microsoft intended to market Halo 2 not just as a video game, but as a cultural event. Part of its widespread appeal would come from the social nature of the multiplayer, but Microsoft also heavily promoted and marketed it. A trailer for was shown in movie theaters, making Halo 2 the first video game so advertised. Excitement was fueled by the press, with Microsoft telling one journalist that their Halo 2 review would be the most consequential of their career. The marketing heavily focused on Master Chief and the defense of Earth, leaving the reveal of the Arbiter as a playable character a surprise.

Halo 2's release was preceded with promotions and product tie-ins. There was a Halo 2 Celebrity Pre-Release Party at E3 2004, in which a private home was transformed to replicate the world of Halo, complete with camouflaged Marines and roaming Cortanas. Launch events were held worldwide, with players waiting for hours in a line that stretched two blocks in Times Square, New York City. The French version of Halo 2 leaked on the internet in October, and circulated widely.

In addition to more traditional forms of promotion, Halo 2 was also part of an elaborate Alternate Reality Game project, I Love Bees. Microsoft approached 42 Entertainment's Elan Lee, who had helped launch the Xbox with Microsoft, on producing a tie-in game. I Love Bees cost an estimated one million dollars. It centered on a hacked website, supposedly a site about beekeeping, where an AI from the future was residing. The project garnered significant attention, drawing attention away from the ongoing 2004 U.S. Presidential Election. It won an award for creativity at the 5th annual Game Developers Choice Awards and was nominated for a Webby award. Nearly 3 million people participated.

Halo 2 was sold in a standard edition and "Limited Collector's Edition". The Collector's Edition includes the game, packaged in a metal case. It also includes bonus content on an extra DVD, such as a making-of documentary, art gallery, and audio tests. The instructional booklet is also written from the Covenant point of view rather than from the UNSC point of view used in the regular edition.

=== Sales ===
Halo 2 was released on November 9, 2004, in Australia, Canada, New Zealand, and the United States. Anticipation was high; a record 1.5 million copies were pre-ordered three weeks before release. Massive lines formed at midnight releases at more than 7000 stores across North America and attracted significant media attention. This was followed by releases on November 10, 2004, in France and parts of Europe, and November 11 in the UK, Japan, and elsewhere. Halo 2 was released in eight languages and a total of 27 countries.

Halo 2 sold 2.4 million copies and earned up to US$125 million in its first 24 hours on store shelves, outgrossing the film Pirates of the Caribbean: Dead Man's Chest as the highest-grossing release in entertainment history. It sold 260,000 units in the United Kingdom in its first week, making it the third fastest-selling game in that territory. It ultimately received a "Double Platinum" sales award from the Entertainment and Leisure Software Publishers Association (ELSPA), indicating sales of at least 600,000 copies in the United Kingdom. In the United States, it was the second best-selling game of 2004 (after Grand Theft Auto: San Andreas) with sales of 4.2 million that year, and the eighteenth best-selling game of the 2000s decade.

On release, Halo 2 was the most popular video game on Xbox Live, holding that rank until the release of Gears of War for the Xbox 360 nearly two years later. In the first ten weeks of release, players collectively logged 91 million hours playing it; by June 2006, more than 500 million games of Halo 2 had been played, and more than 710 million hours logged on Xbox Live. Over five million players had played by 2007. Halo 2 is the best-selling first-generation Xbox game with at least 6.3 million copies sold in the United States and 8.46 million copies in total.

== Reception ==
Reception

Aggregate score
| Aggregator | Score | |
| Aggregator | PC | Xbox |
|---|---|---|
| Metacritic | 72/100 | 95/100 |

Review scores
| Publication | Score | |
| Publication | PC | Xbox |
|---|---|---|
| 1Up.com | C+ | A+ |
| Edge | N/A | 9/10 |
| Game Informer | 8/10 | 10/10 |
| GameSpot | 7/10 | 9.4/10 |
| GameSpy | 3/5 | 5/5 |
| IGN | 7.5/10 | 9.8/10 |

Halo 2 received acclaim. On review aggregate site Metacritic, the Xbox version has an overall score of 95 out of 100. Critics judged it a worthy successor to Halo. GameSpot's Greg Kasavin wrote that it successfully built on its predecessor's foundation, and despite shortcomings, its breadth of content made it one of the best action games available.

The audiovisual presentation was praised. Multiplayer especially was noted in being the best on Xbox Live at the time. Game Informer, along with numerous other publications, rated it higher than Halo: Combat Evolved, citing enhanced multiplayer and less repetitive gameplay. Most critics noted that Halo 2 stuck with the formula that made its predecessor successful, and was alternatively praised and faulted for this decision. Edge's review concluded that Halo 2 could be summed up with a line from its script: "It's not a new plan. But we know it'll work."

The campaign mode received some criticism for being too short, and for featuring an abrupt cliffhanger ending. GameSpot found that although the story's switching between the Covenant and human factions made the plot more intricate, it distracted the player from Earth's survival and the game's main purpose; while Edge labeled the plot "a confusing mess of fan-fiction sci-fi and bemusing Episode-II-style politics".

Halo 2 won multiple awards at the 8th Annual Interactive Achievement Awards, including "Console Game of the Year", "Console First-Person Action Game of the Year", "Outstanding Achievement in Online Gameplay" and "Outstanding Achievement in Sound Design", as well as nominations for "Outstanding Innovation in Console Gaming", and "Game of the Year". It received more than 38 individual awards. It received runner-up placements in GameSpot's 2004 "Best Shooter", "Best Sound Effects" and "Best Original Music" categories across all platforms. It was listed in Electronic Gaming Monthly's "The Greatest 200 Video Games of Their Time" in 2006.

== Post-release ==
=== Updates and DLC ===
Halo 2's multiplayer suffered from widespread cheating on release. Some players used "standbying" or "lag killing" to cheat, whereby the player hosting would intentionally press the standby button on their modem. This resulted in all other players freezing in place and allowed the cheater to kill other players or capture objectives. Another exploit called "BXR" allowed players to cancel melee animations and quickly attack for an instant kill. Rather than rely solely on user reports of misbehavior, Bungie leveraged its game statistics collection to proactively find cheating players, creating an automated banning system.

Bungie released several map packs for Halo 2, adding new environments for multiplayer matches. The Multiplayer Map Pack, released July 5, 2005, made Xbox Live content and updates available to offline players. The disc contains the software update, nine new multiplayer maps, a making-of documentary, and a bonus cinematic called "Another Day on the Beach", among other features. The Blastacular Map Pack contained two additional maps and released April 2007. On July 7 Bungie made the Blastacular Map Pack free.

Halo 2 was one of the Xbox games that was backward-compatible on the Xbox 360. On the newer console, it runs at high-definition 720p with scene-wide anti-aliasing. The ability to download DLC for Halo 2 was discontinued when support for original Xbox Live games was terminated in 2010.

=== Ports and rereleases ===
In February 2006, Microsoft announced a PC port of Halo 2, exclusively for the Windows Vista operating system. Like the Xbox version, the release of Halo 2 Vista was repeatedly delayed. The May 22, 2007, release date was pushed to May 31 after the discovery of partial nudity in the map editor—a photograph of Charlie Gough, one of the lead engineers, mooning Steve Ballmer during his visit to the studio, was presented as part of the ".ass" (amalgam scene specification) error message, displayed in the level editor when attempting to non-uniformly scale level geometry. Microsoft offered patches to remove the nude content and revised the box ratings. Halo 2 could be enabled to play on Windows XP through an unauthorized third-party patch. Halo 2 Vista was ported by a small team at Microsoft Game Studios (codenamed Hired Gun) who worked closely with Bungie. As one of the launch games of Games for Windows – Live, Halo 2 offered Live features not available in the Xbox version, such as Guide support and Achievements. The Windows port also added two exclusive multiplayer maps and a map editor.

In January 2013, a blog post on Halo Waypoint indicated that online services for Halo 2 for Windows Vista would shut down on February 15, 2013. This date was pushed back multiple times, and the servers finally ceased operations in 2015. A high-definition remaster, Halo 2 Anniversary, was released as part of Halo: The Master Chief Collection on November 11, 2014, for the Xbox One. It was later released on PC for Steam and Windows Store.

== Legacy ==
Halo 2's release was part of a shift towards blockbuster gaming releases. In 2004, the video game industry was estimated to gross $7.76 billion in the United States, behind the $9.4 billion gross of the domestic box office. Halo 2's success was seen by the press as evidence of a generational shift in entertainment. The CBC's Greg Bolton remarked that prior to Halo 2's splashy release, "the video-game industry hadn't yet found a recognizable public face, a universally acclaimed megastar." The Ringer called Halo 2 "the birth of the video game as we know it today: a mass shared experience," and credited it with birthing modern multiplayer infrastructure and popularizing American esports.

Halo 2's matchmaking technology was one of the turning points in the gaming industry during the 2000s, setting a new standard for other games. G4's Sterling McGarvey wrote that "Bungie's sequel was a shot in the arm for Xbox Live subscriptions and previewed many of the features that would set the standard for Microsoft's online service on the next machine". Critics credited it with bringing online multiplayer to the console masses, and as serving as Xbox Live's killer app. The Province's Paul Chapman wrote that games like Call of Duty: Modern Warfare 2 would not be enjoyable if not for the ground Halo 2 broke.
