= Alex Seropian =

American video game developer

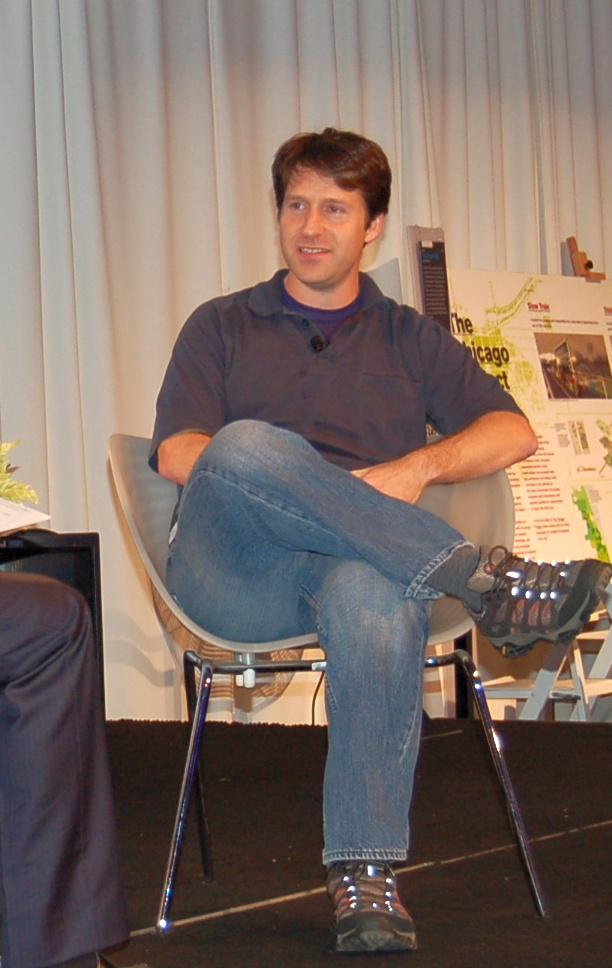
- Seropian at Wired Nextfest, October 2008
- Born: Alexander Seropian; 1969 (age 56–57)
- Education: University of Chicago
- Occupation: Video game developer
- Employer(s): Bungie (1991–2004); Wideload Games (2004–2012); Industrial Toys (2012–2023); Look North World (2023-present)
- Known for: Co-Founder of Bungie, Co-creator of Marathon, Myth, and Halo

Alexander Seropian (born 1969) is an American video game developer, one of the initial founders and later president of Bungie, the developer of the Marathon, Myth, and Halo video game series. Seropian became interested in computer programming in college and teamed up with fellow student Jason Jones to publish Jones's game Minotaur: The Labyrinths of Crete. The two became partners, and Bungie grew to become the best-known Apple Macintosh game developer before being bought by Microsoft in 2001.

In 2004, Seropian left Bungie and created Wideload Games, with the goal of streamlining game development. Wideload's small core development team worked with outside contractors to produce Stubbs the Zombie and Hail to the Chimp. Wideload was acquired by Disney in 2009. As part of the deal Seropian became vice president of game development for Disney Interactive Studios. In 2012 he left the position to start Industrial Toys, a company focusing on mobile games. In 2018, Industrial Toys was acquired by Electronic Arts and was closed in January 2023. In July 2023, Seropian started Look North World with former Electronic Arts and Kongregate developers.

== Biography ==
=== Early life ===
Alex Seropian attended the University of Chicago, and joined the Phi Delta Theta fraternity, where he met one of his future colleagues Jason Jones. Seropian is of Armenian descent. Interested in computer programming, Seropian was pursuing a mathematics degree with a concentration in computer science as the Department of Computer Science did not offer undergraduate degrees at the time. He graduated in 1991 with a Bachelor of Science degree in mathematics. Before graduating, Seropian was living with his father, sleeping on his couch, and debating whether to get a job or create his own video game company. Seropian's father advised him to take a job to get experience, but the next day Seropian decided to found his own company. "My dad is a master of reverse psychology", Seropian said.

=== Bungie ===
Seropian's first game was a self-published Pong-clone called Gnop! for Apple Macintosh. The game was free, although a few customers paid $15 for the game's source code. In 1991 he founded Bungie and published his first commercial game, Operation Desert Storm. Seropian sold 2,500 copies of the game, assembling the game boxes and mailing them out from his bedroom. Seropian partnered with his Artificial Intelligence classmate Jason Jones to publish Jones's nearly complete Minotaur: The Labyrinths of Crete; the game sold around 2,500 copies—it required a then-rare modem for network play—it developed a devoted following. After publishing Minotaur, the two formed a partnership.

For the next Bungie title, 1993's Pathways Into Darkness, Seropian hired a third team member for graphics work. The game was the first three-dimensional texture-mapped game on the Mac and the first true first-person shooter. By 1994, Bungie had grown to a staff of six and had moved into a rundown Chicago office—a converted former religious school located in front of a crack house. Their next title, Marathon, began development as a sequel to Pathways but grew larger. On release it won several awards and established Bungie as the top Mac game developer.

For Halo: Combat Evolved, Seropian noted that the company had to incorporate new features such as surround sound and cinematics. Halo went on to sell more than 4 million units by 2004 and founded a media franchise encompassing sequels, books, and music. Seropian left Bungie in 2002 to spend time with his new family, but also due to frustrations with the game development process.

=== Wideload Games ===
Seropian founded his own studio in 2004 called Wideload Games, intended to be more streamlined than most video game studios. Calling the method of game development "broken", Wideload began with a staff of 10 and planned to employ outside members to work on and finalize projects. Seropian said that the idea came from figuring out that his decade-old assumptions about how to make games did not necessarily apply to the future. Seropian turned to the film industry for cues, saying that it helped to look at an older industry that had been solving the same types of problems for a longer period than video games. The external development model allowed Wideload to focus on the creative aspect of a project and added flexibility in what types of projects the team could take on. Wideload produced two games, 2005's Stubbs the Zombie in Rebel Without a Pulse and 2008's Hail to the Chimp.

On September 8, 2009 Disney acquired Wideload. Seropian joined Disney to head its in-house game development team, Disney Interactive Studios. The sale of Wideload was not originally planned: Wideload and Disney began working on a title together, and as conversations turned to a "broader scope and vision", the two companies "discovered [they] had a lot in common," Seropian said. Seropian left Disney in February 2012. Seropian also serves as DePaul University's second "game designer in residence"; DePaul is the first liberal arts university to offer a bachelor's degree for game design.

=== Industrial Toys ===
In 2012, Seropian founded a studio named Industrial Toys. The company planned to develop mobile games for core gamers. The first title by Industrial Toys, Midnight Star, was announced to be a sci-fi shooter designed with touch-based mobile platforms in mind, and debuted in February 2015. In July 2018, Industrial Toys was acquired by Electronic Arts, who shuttered the studio in January 2023.

=== Look North World ===
In July 2023, Seropian, along with Jay Pecho, Patrick Moran, Kyle Marks, Aaron Marroquin, and Prashant Patil, founded Look North World. The studio aims to develop and release experimental Fortnite "islands" built on Unreal Editor for Fortnite every two to three months. Their first title was Outlaw Corral, released in July 2023, with their second being Carrera Coast, released in October 2023, which came with a prize pool.
