= Halo 3 =

2007 video game

- Developer: Bungie
- Publisher: Microsoft Game Studios
- Composers: Martin O'Donnell; Michael Salvatori
- Series: Halo
- Platform: Xbox 360
- Release: AU/NA: September 25, 2007; EU: September 26, 2007
- Genre: First-person shooter
- Modes: Single-player, multiplayer

Halo 3 is a 2007 first-person shooter video game developed by Bungie for the Xbox 360 console. The third installment in the Halo franchise following Halo: Combat Evolved (2001) and Halo 2 (2004), the game's story centers on the interstellar war between 26th-century humanity, a collection of alien races known as the Covenant, and the alien parasite known as the Flood. The player assumes the role of the Master Chief, a cybernetically enhanced supersoldier, as he battles the Covenant and the Flood. In cooperative play, other human players assume the role of allied alien soldiers. The game features vehicles, weapons, and gameplay elements familiar and new to the series, as well as the addition of saved gameplay films, file sharing, and the Forge map editor—a utility which allows the player to perform modifications to multiplayer levels.

Halo 2 had originally been intended to wrap up the story begun with Combat Evolved, but development difficulties led to a cliffhanger ending. Bungie began developing Halo 3 shortly after Halo 2 shipped. The game was officially announced at E3 2006, and its release was preceded by a multiplayer beta open to select players who purchased the Xbox 360 game Crackdown. Microsoft spent $40 million on marketing the game, in an effort to sell more game consoles and broaden the appeal of the game beyond the established Halo fanbase. Marketing included cross-promotions and an alternate reality game.

Halo 3 was released on September 25 and grossed US$170 million on its first day of release, rising to $300 million in its first week. The game sold in excess of 14.5 million copies and was the best-selling video game of 2007 in the United States. More than one million people played Halo 3 on Xbox Live in the first twenty hours. Overall, the game was well received by critics, with the Forge and multiplayer offerings singled out as strong features; however, some reviewers criticized single-player aspects, especially the plot and campaign layout. Halo 3 is frequently listed as one of the greatest video games of all time. A sequel, Halo 4, released in November 2012, was developed by 343 Industries. Halo 3 was re-released as part of Halo: The Master Chief Collection for the Xbox One in November 2014 and for Windows on July 14, 2020.

== Gameplay ==
Master Chief aims his assault rifle at a group of Covenant Grunts. A piece of activated equipment, called the bubble shield, is shown.

Halo 3 is a shooter game where players primarily experience gameplay from a first-person perspective. Much of the gameplay takes place on foot, but also includes segments focused on vehicular combat. Combat focuses on the use of weapons, grenades, and melee attacks, which are available to a player in most situations. Players may dual-wield some weapons for additional firepower, forgoing the use of grenades and melee attacks. Unlike previous installments, the player's secondary weapon is visible on their player model, holstered or slung across the player's back. Halo 3 introduces support weapons, cumbersome two-handed weapons that slow the player when carried, but offer greatly increased firepower in return.

In addition to weapons, Halo 3 contains a new class of gear called equipment; these items have various effects, ranging from defensive screens to shield regeneration and flares. Only one piece of equipment can be carried at a time. The game's vehicular component has been expanded with new drivable and AI-only vehicles.

Halo 3 contains non-gameplay additions, such as Forge, a map-editing tool. Forge enables players to insert and remove game objects, such as weapons, crates, and vehicles into existing multiplayer maps. Almost all weapons, vehicles, and interactive objects can be placed and moved on maps with Forge. Players can enter Forge games and edit and manipulate objects in real time. A budget limits the number of objects that can be placed. Players may also save up to 100 films of gameplay to their Xbox 360's hard drive, viewing the action from any angle and at different speeds. Halo 3 offers a form of file sharing, where items such as saved films, screenshots, and custom variants can all be uploaded to Bungie's official website. Anyone can browse user created content that has been uploaded to Bungie's website and tag it to automatically download to their console next time they sign into Xbox Live on Halo 3.

=== Modes ===
Halo 3's story or campaign mode can be played alone or cooperatively with up to three other players via Xbox Live or System Link. Instead of each player being an identical character in cooperative play, as in previous Halo games, the first player plays as Master Chief, the second player as the Arbiter, and the final two players controlling the Covenant Elites N'tho 'Sraom and Usze 'Taham. Each player has identical abilities, although their starting weapons vary. Hidden skulls found on each level cause changes to the gameplay when enabled, such as giving the enemies extra health, changing in-game dialogue, or modifying AI behavior. These skulls, as well as the difficulty level and the speed at which the level is completed, provide multipliers to the total score. Players are awarded gamerscore points for unlocking Achievements by reaching a certain score in each level.

Local area network or Xbox Live supports up to sixteen players in multiplayer matches, with game modes including variations of deathmatch and Capture the Flag. Players must actively seek out other players through their Xbox Live Friends list, using the party invite system, or the LAN search feature to play multiplayer matches with their own custom rules and customized maps. If they are connected to Xbox Live however, a player can choose to have the game decide for them the exact rules and map to play on, as well as finding additional people to play against or with, using the "Matchmaking" system (the automated grouping of players of similar skill). A player will decide from a selection of developer designed "playlists" which each contain a certain way to experience the game.

Like other multiplayer Xbox 360 titles, Halo 3 uses a customized version of TrueSkill ranking system for its matchmaking on a per-playlist basis. A linear measure of a player's experience with the matchmade portion of the game and each particular playlist is also tracked (denoted as EXP). To help players have an enjoyable time online, several peace-of-mind features are implemented within easy reach, such as avoid/feedback options on a player's service record, as well as voice chat mute straight from the in-game scoreboard. Like Halo 2, Halo 3 supports downloadable content and updates. The online services for the original Xbox 360 version of the game went offline in January 2022.

== Synopsis ==
=== Setting and characters ===
Halo 3 is set in a science fiction setting during the years 2552 and 2553. Humanity is at war with a genocidal alliance of alien races known as the Covenant. After years of conflict, a Covenant fleet discovers Earth during Halo 2. "Halos" are massive ringworlds, ranging from thousands to tens of thousands of kilometers in diameter, scattered across the galaxy. These rings were constructed thousands of years ago by a race known as the Forerunners as weapons of last resort against the parasitic alien species known as the Flood. When activated, the Halos would destroy all sentient life in the galaxy, depriving the Flood of its food. The Forerunners disappeared after they activated the rings. In Halo: Combat Evolved, whilst fleeing the Covenant, the UNSC ship Pillar of Autumn stumbled upon one of these Halos, Installation 04. Against the wishes of the ring's artificial intelligence (AI) caretaker, 343 Guilty Spark, the human supersoldier Master Chief destroyed the ring to stop the threat from Halo and the Flood. The Covenant, unaware of the destructive nature of the rings, attempt to fire another ring, Installation 05, during Halo 2 to fulfill their religious prophecy. One race in the Covenant, the Elites, learn the truth about the rings, and join forces with humanity to stop the installation's firing. Though they are successful, the unexpected shutdown triggers a fail-safe protocol, priming all the rings for firing from one location, referred to as the Ark. Still oblivious to the true nature of the rings, the Covenant High Prophet of Truth and the remaining loyalist Covenant proceed to head to Earth, where they believe the Ark is buried.

Halo 3's protagonist is Master Chief Petty Officer John-117, an enhanced supersoldier known as a "Spartan". Master Chief fights alongside the Arbiter, a disgraced Covenant Elite commander. Two other Elite characters, N'tho 'Sraom and Usze 'Taham, appear as the third and fourth players in cooperative play. Supporting characters from previous games return, including human soldiers Avery Johnson and Miranda Keyes. Also playing a role in the story is the Flood leader known as the "Gravemind". In Halo 2, the Gravemind escapes from confinement, invades the Covenant mobile capital city of High Charity, and captures the human AI Cortana.

=== Plot ===
After the events of the comic tie-in Halo: Uprising, the Master Chief arrives on Earth in east Africa, where he is found by Johnson and the Arbiter. The Chief and company return to a UNSC outpost where Keyes and Lord Hood plan a final effort to stop the Covenant leader, the High Prophet of Truth, from activating a Forerunner artifact the Covenant have excavated. The Chief clears anti-air Covenant defenses so Hood can lead the last of Earth's ships against the Prophet, but Truth activates the buried artifact, creating a slipspace portal which he and his followers enter. A Flood-infested ship crash-lands nearby; Elite forces arrive and vitrify the Flood-infected areas of Earth, stopping the threat. Following a message Cortana left aboard the Flood ship, the Chief, Arbiter, Elites, Johnson, Keyes and their troops follow Truth through the portal. Joining them is 343 Guilty Spark, who aids the Chief as he has no function to fulfill after the destruction of his Halo.

Traveling through the portal, the humans and Elites discover an immense artificial structure known as the Ark, far beyond the edges of the Milky Way galaxy. Here, Truth can remotely activate all the Halos. The Flood arrive aboard High Charity in full force, beginning to infest the installation. Truth captures Johnson, as he needs a human to use Forerunner technology. Keyes is killed attempting a rescue, and Johnson is forced to activate the rings. Gravemind forges a truce with the Chief and Arbiter to stop Truth and defeat the remainder of his army, rescuing Johnson and halting the installations' activation. After the Arbiter kills Truth, Gravemind turns on the Chief and Arbiter.

The Chief, Arbiter, and Guilty Spark discover that the Ark is constructing another Halo to replace the one that the Chief previously destroyed. The Chief decides to activate this Halo; the Halo would eliminate the Flood infestation on the Ark while sparing the galaxy at large from destruction. To activate the ring, the Chief rescues Cortana, who has the Activation Index of the destroyed Halo, from High Charity and destroys the city. Arriving on the new Halo, Cortana warns that Gravemind is trying to rebuild itself on the ring. The Chief, Arbiter, and Johnson travel to Halo's control room to activate the ring. Guilty Spark explains that because the ring is not yet complete, a premature activation will destroy it and the Ark. When Johnson ignores his warning, Guilty Spark fatally wounds him to protect "his" ring. Although the Chief destroys Guilty Spark, Johnson soon dies of his injuries. Chief activates the ring, and escapes the ring's self-destruction on the UNSC frigate Forward Unto Dawn. However, the force of Halo's blast causes the slipspace portal to collapse, resulting in only the front half of Forward Unto Dawn, carrying the Arbiter, making it back to Earth.

A memorial service is held on Earth for the fallen heroes of the Human-Covenant war, during which the Arbiter and Lord Hood briefly exchange words regarding the fallen Master Chief. After the memorial service, the Arbiter and his Elite brethren depart for their home planet. Meanwhile, the rear half of the Forward Unto Dawn drifts in unknown space. Cortana drops a distress beacon, but acknowledges it may be many years before they are rescued. As the Master Chief enters cryonic sleep, Cortana confides to him that she will miss him, but he comforts her by telling her "wake me when you need me." If the game is completed at the Legendary difficulty level, the scene continues to show the piece of Forward Unto Dawn drifting towards an unknown planet, setting up the events of Halo 4.

== Development ==
Halo 2 was a critical and commercial success, but its development had taken a toll on Bungie. The game's development was fraught and rushed, resulting in the final act of the game's campaign being cut. Bungie was openly critical of the game's shortcomings, and viewed a third Halo game as a chance to do right by fans for Halo 2's problems, as well as the final Halo game the studio would make before moving onto other projects. Lingering dissatisfaction with Bungie's acquisition by Microsoft in 2000 and a desire for more favorable profit-sharing on Halo 3 led to an agreement where Bungie would become an independent studio after shipping a set number of new Halo games.

After Halo 2 shipped, Bungie cofounder Jason Jones went on sabbatical, leaving the Halo 3 team with little direction or leadership; different staff members wrestled over who would take on creative positions for the new game, and no clear creative direction was decided upon. Story writer Joseph Staten took a vacation after coming into conflict with other staff members, meaning there was no clear person who was responsible for the game's story for a portion of development. The story was drafted by a committee, then presented to senior Bungie members. Composer Martin O'Donnell recalled he did not feel the draft would work, as it left out previous characters and plot threads. Having recently seen the film Serenity, he insisted that characters should die to increase the stakes. Staten returned to do edits after the plot had been established.

Halo 2 had popularized online multiplayer matchmaking and social features like player parties and voice chat. The Xbox 360 integrated many similar features into Xbox Live, but changed the underlying system. Designer Max Hoberman recalled that instead of creating new features, he spent a year fixing broken features to get back to parity with Halo 2.

Compared to the harried pace of Halo 2's development which necessitated painful cuts to ship the game on time, Bungie staffers recalled Halo 3's development as much more smooth, with more time to add features like Forge mode. The multiplayer map design team, led by Chris Carney and Steve Cotton, had plenty of time to prototype and playtest new designs and concepts to build a stable of solid ideas for future maps. Many of those early prototypes led to some of the most iconic multiplayer maps in the Halo series.

Bungie remained quiet as to what their new project was, leaving comments in their weekly update alluding to a "new project". The game was officially announced with a real-time cinematic trailer at E3 2006.

In comparison with Halo 2's tight-lipped development, Bungie was more transparent about the process for Halo 3. Bungie kept the public informed on game development via weekly updates on their web site. During development, the game was divided into single player and multiplayer builds; this made debugging and testing the much smaller multiplayer files quicker. While details of Halo 3's multiplayer were widely disseminated in the sixteen months leading up to the release, the single-player aspect of the storyline was kept relatively secret throughout much of the development to build up interest. The first campaign screenshots did not appear until a year after the announcement trailer, on July 5, 2007, as a "tease" for the planned pace of marketing.

A public beta test of the game's online multiplayer features, as well as saved films and file share, took place four months before the full release. It consisted of three multiplayer maps: High Ground, Valhalla, and Snowbound. Access to the beta required a Crackdown disc.

AI behavior was enhanced and improved; the behavior of enemy Brutes the player faces was modified, giving them a "pack mentality" that causes the aliens to perform similar actions at the same time and altering gameplay.

=== Graphics ===
Halo 3 uses a proprietary, in-house graphics engine. It employs graphics technologies such as high dynamic range, global lighting, and depth of field effects within cutscenes. Motion blurring was absent from the beta, but was added to the final game. Most dynamic objects in the game cast real-time shadows on themselves and the environment around them, including the game's plant life. Halo 3 uses normal, bump, and parallax mapping to give surfaces more detail without dramatically increasing the number of polygons. Players can see distances of up to ten miles (16 km) away, all fully three-dimensional. The engine is capable of real-time reflections, but are often unused as Bungie considered it a waste of resources. Halo 3 uses two frame buffers instead of the usual single buffer, allowing Bungie to preserve as much of dynamic range as possible for the game's lighting without adversely affecting the frame rate. As a consequence, the game natively renders at 1152×640 resolution instead of 720p. The image can be upscaled to 1080p by the Xbox 360. Halo 3 has also been enhanced for Xbox One X, rendering at 1920p upscaled to 2160p in HDR at a solid 30fps.

=== Audio ===
As with all titles on the Xbox 360, Halo 3 fully supports 5.1 surround sound audio. In the game, there are over 50,000 pieces of audio, with nearly 40,000 of those being NPC dialogue. This is far more than in either of the preceding Halo titles; Halo 2 had over 15,000 pieces of dialogue. The AI controlling this dialogue is designed to ensure the exchanges flow naturally and convincingly. Separate recordings were made for nearby and distant gunfire to make for a more believable sound experience in the public beta, and the finished game uses Waves Audio plugins to modify dialog and other audio in-game depending on conditions. Distant gunfire sounds, which may first seem like pre-recorded ambient sound, may often be the result of an actual firefight happening elsewhere in the game.

Marty O'Donnell again composed the original score for the game. Some pieces of the game's music are produced with a much larger real orchestra than any pieces in the prior two games. For example, the music for the announcement trailer was recorded with a 60-piece orchestra and a 24-piece choir. The Halo 3 Original Soundtrack was released on November 20, 2007. Included on the soundtrack is an original composition submitted by fans and judged by Nile Rodgers, Michael Ostin, and Marty O'Donnell.

Voice actors returning to reprise their roles in Halo 3 include Jen Taylor as Cortana, David Scully as Sergeant Johnson and the Elites, Keith David as the Arbiter, Tim Dadabo as 343 Guilty Spark, Ron Perlman as Lord Hood, Robert Davi as Rtas 'Vadum, and Steve Downes as the voice of Master Chief. The game also features new voices, with Terence Stamp and Justis Bolding replacing Halo 2 voice actors Michael Wincott and Julie Benz as the Prophet of Truth and Miranda Keyes respectively. Additional voices include celebrity presenter Jonathan Ross, Nathan Fillion, Adam Baldwin, Alan Tudyk, Katee Sackhoff, and John DiMaggio. Members of the Halo machinima Red vs. Blue (Burnie Burns, Gus Sorola, Matt Hullum, Jason Saldaña, Geoff Ramsey, and Joel Heyman) have cameo roles.

== Release ==
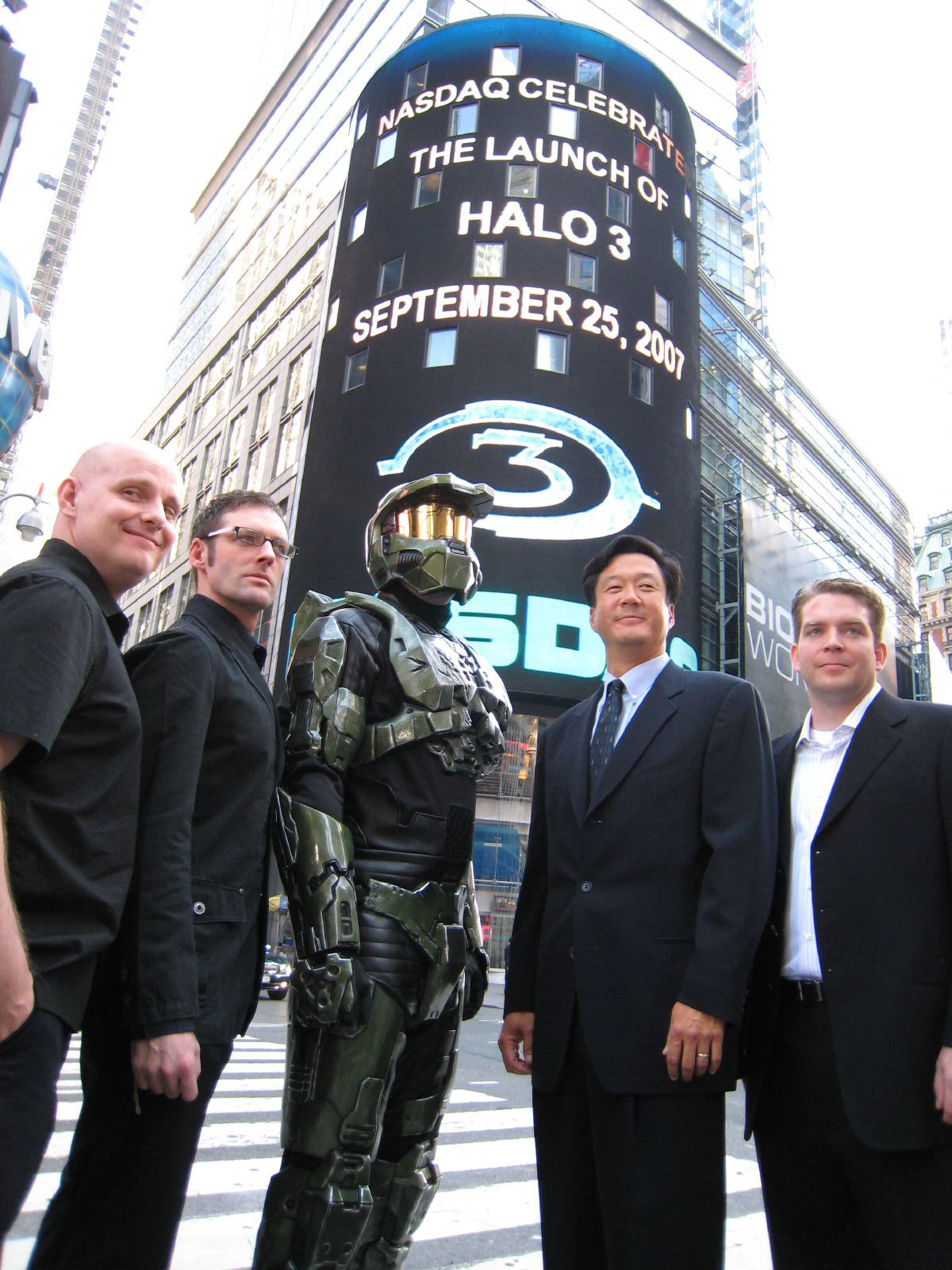
A Halo 3 launch event was held at the NASDAQ building in New York City on September 25, 2007.

Microsoft spent more than $40 million marketing Halo 3. The goal of the campaign was to sell more Xbox 360 consoles and widen the appeal of the game beyond the "Halo faithful" to casual as well as hardcore gamers. Marketing took the form of stages, including trailers of the game, real-time cinematics, recorded gameplay sequences, pre-rendered CGI, and live action film. On September 12, 2007, the "Believe" Halo 3 ad campaign, focused on the epic nature of the story and heroism told through dioramas and third party accounts of Master Chief's service, began with the video "Museum" and continued on past the game's release.

Throughout the course of development Bungie released four "developer documentaries" that explained the processes behind creating parts of the game. A large-scale multiplayer beta test was played on Xbox Live with more than 800,000 members of the public being able to take part and experience the game for themselves. Beginning in June 2007, an alternate reality game called Iris involved players in slowly revealing background information for the game. The actual release was met with worldwide launch parties.

Halo 3 also had marketing tie-ins and promotions. PepsiCo announced a new line of soft drink, a variant of Mountain Dew named Game Fuel, branded with the Halo 3 logo and the Master Chief. Much of the advertising focused on appealing to the general public, rather than just hardcore fans of the game; for example, some 7-Eleven stores advertised Halo 3 and sold specialty cups and copies of the game. Gamestation stores in the UK offered a limited edition Master Chief figurine to the first 1000 preorders.

The game's final testing copy before its gold release—codenamed "Epsilon" and confirmed by Bungie to be almost complete—was leaked to the Internet months before the game's release date. Microsoft reacted to this leak by having the Xbox Live accounts of gamers caught playing the leaked copy banned until the year 9999. Retail copies of the game, complete with photographs of the open game box, started to appear on the internet auction site eBay weeks before release, followed by UK catalog retailer Argos accidentally releasing some of their copies a week early. Microsoft's Entertainment and Devices division were quoted as being "disappointed" that the Argos leak happened, but stated they had no intention for punishing them for an "honest mistake". The retail copy was also leaked online over a week before release, with the 6.14 gigabyte file of the game ripped from a disc and downloaded by thousands of people within 24 hours. Videos of the ending of Halo 3, obtained from the leaked copy, were captured and posted on video sharing sites.

Halo 3 was released on September 25, 2007, in three separate retail versions: "Standard", "Limited", and "Legendary". The Standard Edition contains the game disc, manual, and a small poster with the game's control-map and artwork. The Limited Edition, contained in a metal case, contains the game disc, manual, poster, Xbox 360 bonus disc with featurettes, and a hardcover-bound "Bestiarum", a collection of information and art covering the species, cultures, and civilizations of Halo 3. The Legendary Edition contains the game disc, manual, poster, interactive bonus disc, the Bestiarum on a DVD, Legendary DVD containing exclusive content, and a scale replica of the Master Chief's helmet as a case for the three discs. The slip-cover packaging unfolds into a large heavy-stock poster of Master Chief. Some of the Limited Edition versions of Halo 3 were found to have a defect in the hub that kept the discs in place, which could lead to scratched discs. Microsoft introduced a disc replacement program in response.

On the day before its official release, 4.2 million units of Halo 3 were in retail outlets.

Halo 3 was made a free download for Xbox Live Gold subscribers through the "Games with Gold" program in October 2013. It became playable on the Xbox One via backward compatibility in 2017. An Xbox One-native version of the game, presenting the graphics at 1080p and 60 frames per second, was included as part of Halo: The Master Chief Collection for the Xbox One in 2014. Halo 3 was re-released again as part of the Windows version of The Master Chief Collection in 2020.

== Downloadable content ==
Halo 3 supports multiplayer map downloadable content as well as game updates via Xbox Live. The first three post-release multiplayer maps, "Standoff", "Rat's Nest", and "Foundry", were released as a pack on December 11, 2007, collectively known as the "Heroic Map Pack". A second group of three maps including a remake of Halo 2 map "Lockout", titled "Blackout", a new map "Ghost Town" and a remake of Halo: Combat Evolved map "Sidewinder", titled "Avalanche" were bundled as the "Legendary Map Pack", on April 15, 2008. These maps introduced visual filters to the Forge pallet, which change the way the maps look. A remake of the Halo: Combat Evolved map "Chill Out", titled "Cold Storage", was released as a free download on "Bungie Day", July 7, 2008. The third multiplayer map pack, titled the "Mythic Map Pack" and consisting of the maps "Orbital", "Assembly", and "Sandbox", was included with the Limited Collectors Edition of Halo Wars. The map pack was released over the Xbox Live Marketplace on April 9, 2009. The fourth and final multiplayer map pack, "Mythic II Map Pack", was released on February 2, 2010. The map pack includes the three new maps from Halo 3: ODST: "Citadel", "Longshore", and a remake of Halo 2 map "Midship", titled "Heretic".

The first version update for Halo 3 was released on February 19, 2008, and addressed various bugs such as melee contest resolution and saved-film theater errors. The next update (called a Title Update) was released September 23, 2008, and includes new Achievements, a new XP ranking system, and various new ways to detect and stop cheating in the game. No further Halo 3 updates were planned.

== Reception ==
=== Sales ===
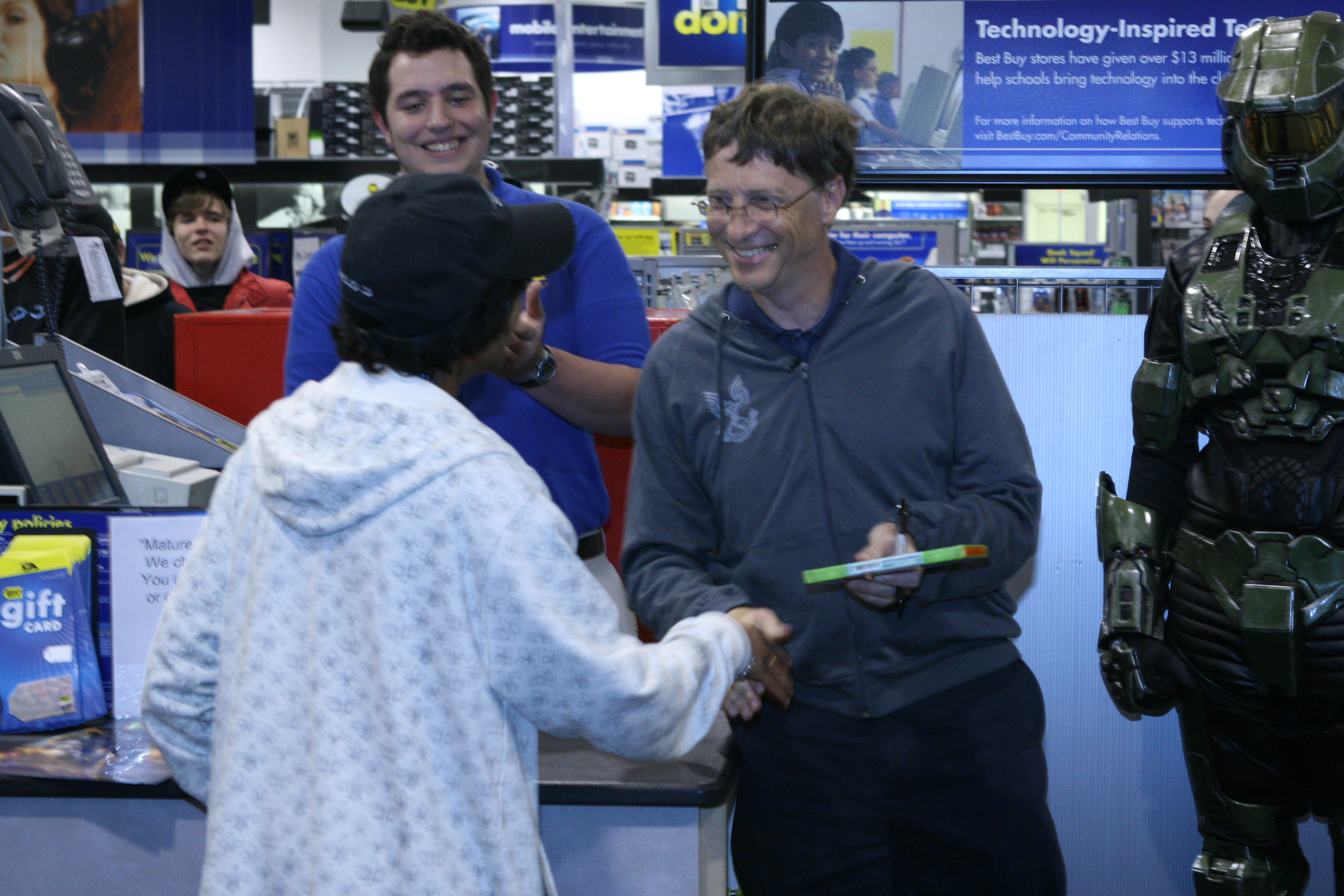
Bill Gates selling the first official copy of Halo 3 at Best Buy in Bellevue, Washington

First-day sales of Halo 3 reached $170 million in the U.S., setting a record for highest gross of a video game within 24 hours of its release. The performance beat the previous record setter—Halo 2—which earned $125 million within 24 hours of its launch. The game was preordered by more than one million people in North America. Worldwide more than US$300 million worth were sold in the first week, helping to more than double the sales of the Xbox 360 when compared with the weekly average before the Halo 3 launch. By 2010, Microsoft reported total grosses at $600 million.

In the U.S., Halo 3 sold 3.3 million copies in its first 12 days on sale, increasing to 3.7 million copies by November 15, 2007. Reuters UK estimated that Halo 3 may have sold up to 5.2 million copies worldwide in the first two weeks after launch. Halo 3 was the best-selling video game of 2007 in the U.S.., and the 14th-best-selling game of the 2000s. The game drew over a million Xbox Live members to play online in the first 20 hours, making it the biggest day for Xbox Live gaming in history. The game returned to the top 20 sales charts more than a year after its release in February 2009; Gamasutra reported that the boost might have been due to the release of Halo Wars. Microsoft announced that Halo 3 had sold 8.1 million copies by January 2008, and 14.5 million copies by 2012.

Advertising Age reported that movie studio executives were convinced the release of Halo 3 harmed box office receipts; the week's take was 27% less than the previous year's yield. While some executives decided the disparity in estimated and actual gross for films like The Heartbreak Kid was due more to the film's poor reception, other analysts believed that "the audience on [Halo 3] is the 18-to-34 demographic, similar to what you'd see in cinemas" and that this led to a decrease in receipts. Later research suggested that the Halo 3 players still watched the same amount of television and movies, regardless of the time they spent playing the game.

=== Critical reception ===
Reception

Aggregate score
Aggregator	Score
Metacritic	94/100

Review scores
Publication	Score
1Up.com	A+
Edge	10/10
Eurogamer	10/10
Famitsu	37/40
Game Informer	9.75/10
GameSpot	9.5/10
GameTrailers	9.8/10
IGN	9.5/10
Official Xbox Magazine (US)	10/10
X-Play	5/5

Halo 3 received critical acclaim upon its release. It holds an average of 94/100 on aggregate website Metacritic. Pro-G's Wesley Yin-Poole assured readers that Halo 3 lived up to the enormous hype surrounding it, writing that the game was "everything we hoped it would be, and much, much, more". Reviewers including Eurogamer's Rob Fahey, GamesRadar's Charlie Barrett, and GameSpot's Jeff Gerstmann felt that the underlying formula of previous Halo games was unchanged, but that this was not a detriment. "Every type of Halo fan, from the hardcore to the casual to the brand new, will find something to satisfy them in Master Chief's third adventure," Barrett asserted, while IGN's Hilary Goldstein referred to Halo 3 as "the most complete game available on any console", specifically stating "the Forge and the replay functionality raise the bar for console shooters so high, it may never be surpassed this generation." The gameplay additions to the game, such as equipment and new vehicles, were praised; Gerstmann and Goldstein noted that equipment had much more relevance in multiplayer matches than the campaign.

Reception of the single-player aspect varied. Yin-Poole wrote that while the cliffhanger ending of Halo 2 was disappointing, the campaign of Halo 3 was much more satisfying. Gerstmann, GameSpy's Gabe Graziani, and Goldstein maintained that the campaign was too short, especially on easier difficulty levels or with three additional players in co-op. Goldstein was highly critical of the eighth level, stating "the penultimate chapter is so bad, just thinking about it puts a rotten taste in my mouth." The New York Times' Charles Herold said the game had a "throwaway" plot and Total Video Games judged the single-player aspect ultimately disappointing. Goldstein and Steve West of Cinema Blend thought a part of the game's story was lost by not having the Arbiter featuring as prominently as the character was in Halo 2.

Most publications agreed that multiplayer was by far one of the best features; IGN said that the multiplayer map lineup was the strongest of the series, and GameSpy added that "each [multiplayer] map is extremely well-tuned". The Forge level editor and saved films features were singled out as particularly strong features, in addition to the voice acting and score.

Other complaints focused on the artificial intelligence; critics praised the enemy AI but complained that the intelligence of the player's allies was far poorer. Bryan Vore of Game Informer said that human faces and some textures were just "embarrassing".

Halo 3 was nominated for seven awards from the Spike TV Awards, of which it won "Best Multiplayer Game" and "Most Addictive Video Game Fueled by Dew". It won Time's "Game of the Year", and IGN chose it as the Best Xbox 360 Online Multiplayer Game and Innovative Design of 2007. The Visual Effects Society awarded Bungie the "Best Real Time Visuals in a Video Game" for Halo 3. Halo 3 took the Calvin Award for "Best Videogame" as selected by Box Office Prophets. Halo 3 also took the award for Xbox 360 Game of the Year 2007 from GameTrailers, and was voted by fans as Game of the Year on G-Phoria. Halo 3 won the Edge Award For Interactive Innovation in August 2008. During the 11th Annual Interactive Achievement Awards, the Academy of Interactive Arts & Sciences nominated Halo 3 for "Action Game of the Year" and "Outstanding Achievement in Online Gameplay". In 2010, the game was included as one of the titles in the book 1001 Video Games You Must Play Before You Die. In 2025, GameStop selected Halo 3 as its inaugural "Best Game of the Year", despite the game being released in 2007.
