= Pathways into Darkness =

1993 video game

- Developer: Bungie
- Publisher: Bungie
- Platforms: Mac OS, OS X
- Release: August 1993
- Genres: First-person shooter, adventure
- Mode: Single-player

Pathways into Darkness is a first-person shooter and adventure video game developed and published by Bungie in 1993, for Macintosh personal computers. Players assume the role of a special forces soldier who must stop a powerful, godlike being from awakening and destroying the world. Players solve puzzles and defeat enemies to unlock parts of a pyramid where the god sleeps; the game's ending changes depending on player actions.

Pathways began as a sequel to Bungie's Minotaur: The Labyrinths of Crete, before the developers created an original story. Jason Jones programmed the game, while his friend Colin Brent developed the environments and creatures. The game features three-dimensional, texture-mapped graphics and stereo sound on supported Macintosh models. Pathways was critically acclaimed and won a host of awards; it was also Bungie's first major commercial success and enabled the two-man team of Jason Jones and Alex Seropian to move into a Chicago office and begin paying staff.

== Gameplay ==
The player character fires at enemies with a pistol. Along the right side of the screen are player status and inventory, while the bottom contains a message console.

Pathways into Darkness is a first-person shooter and adventure game. The game interface consists of four windows. The primary "World View" shows the player character's first-person perspective. Players move, dodge, fire, and use weapons and items using the computer keyboard. The "Inventory" window displays items players have acquired, the "Message" window relates events and the in-game time, and the "Player" window displays health and energy information. The game clock runs constantly during gameplay, except when in conversation; the player loses the game if the sleeping god wakes after a set period of time.

Players fight various monsters as they explore the pyramid's halls and catacombs. They may pick up weapons and ammunition left behind by others to supplement their arsenal. As additional levels are unlocked, new weapons become available, including machine guns and grenade launchers. Players can absorb a certain amount of damage, but once their health reaches zero, they must resume their progress at the last saved checkpoint. Resting in place replenishes health but saps game time and leaves the player open to attack. Scattered throughout the levels are other items players may use. Potions have different effects: rare blue potions, for example, rid the player character of poison and damage. Other items provide money, or points that increases the player character's maximum health. Crystals can be used against enemies to freeze, burn, or otherwise harm them.

Through the use of the yellow crystal, players can converse with Previously Living Sentient Beings or "PLSBs". Conversations provide players with puzzle information, strategies for defeating monsters, and story background. Rather than relying on a branching tree of conversation options, players type keywords into a dialogue box. When a certain keyword (typically found in a previous statement by the dead person in question) is entered, the dead person will give a response. The manual gives a starting point by mentioning that all dead people respond to "name" and "death", by giving their name and describing how they died, respectively.

== Plot ==
Pathways casts the player as a member of a US Army Special Forces team sent on a mission to the Yucatán Peninsula. On May 5, 1994, a diplomat from the alien race known as the Jjaro appeared to the President of the United States and informed him that on May 13, an ancient godlike being sleeping beneath a pyramid would awaken and destroy the Earth. The only way to prevent this catastrophe is to prevent the god from awakening. The eight-man Special Forces team carries a nuclear weapon, with the goal of entering the ancient pyramid, descending to the bottom level where the god sleeps, and activating the bomb to stun the god and bury it under tons of rock.

The player character's parachute fails to open, and they fall unconscious in the landing. Awakening hours later, the player finds almost all their equipment inoperable. Reaching the pyramid on foot hours after the rest of their team, the player must complete the mission before the god awakens in five days. In the pyramid, the player finds bodies of squad-mates, the remains of Spanish-speaking treasure hunters, and fallen members of a Nazi expedition from the 1930s who were looking for a secret weapon. Additional plot elements can be revealed by speaking to these dead, enabled by the yellow crystal.

The game's ending changes depending on whether the player has a radio beacon to call for extraction, and when the nuclear device is set to explode. Forgetting to set the bomb, or setting it to explode at any time past the awakening of the dreaming god, results in Earth's destruction. The device's detonation before the player reaches a minimum safe distance results in a pyrrhic victory. The most favorable endings are achieved by leaving the pyramid with a beacon for evacuation at least twenty game minutes before the device is set to go off, or without a beacon if the game ends with enough time for the player to escape on foot.

== Development ==
Pathways was Bungie's fourth game and third commercial title after their previous game, Minotaur: The Labyrinths of Crete, sold around 2,500 copies. In the summer of 1992, Jones was living in dorms at the University of Chicago when he saw Wolfenstein 3D, a shooter game with three-dimensional (3D) graphics. Inspired, Jones created a rough 3D-graphics engine for the Mac that simulated walls with trapezoids and rectangles. Originally, Bungie intended Pathways to be a straightforward 3D version of Minotaur, but they quickly found that the top-down perspective of their previous game did not mesh with the new 3D presentation. An additional consideration was that the developers wanted to create a game that did not rely on then-rare networks and modems, an issue in marketing Minotaur. The rest of 1992 was spent tweaking the graphics engine.

Work on the game's storyline and levels began in January 1993. Jones recalled that starting from cliché plots, they moved towards "very interesting and unique but extremely difficult to understand stories". One of the plot ideas cast the player as one of a group of Roman soldiers who discovered a mountain spring that extended their lives. Every seven years one soldier would be picked to descend into the caves and bring back more water. If the leader died, a new one would be selected to undertake the journey to ensure their survival. "It was a very interesting plot since your quest wasn't necessarily virtuous, it didn't involve doing good things or saving the world," Jones said. "It was just you were chosen, more or less against your will, to become the next leader of this freak cult of immortals." The final plot occupied a middle ground between the simple and complex stories, because the developers did not want to force players to become deeply involved in the story.

While Bungie founder Alex Seropian handled the business aspect of Bungie and produced the game's box art and promotional material, Jones programmed the game, wrote the story line, and contributed to the game's manual. Whereas Jones had single-handedly coded Minotaur, the small staff for Pathways was due to lack of money for a large team. To speed implementation, Jones built a level editor for the game that allowed him to add objects, monsters, and walls to the levels. The game's levels and mazes span 40 million scaled square feet. Jones' friend, Colin Brent, did much of the art and creature design. This reduced Jones' workload and, in the programmer's opinion, improved the art. Each monster was drawn by hand in different states such as stationary, moving, attacking, and dying. The drawings were scanned into the computer and added to the game; if there were problems, they were redrawn. Once the final drawings were complete, the images were colorized in 24-bit color using Adobe Photoshop. Despite the game's advanced graphics, Pathways was designed to work on any Macintosh model; it was one of 30 applications that ran natively on Apple's PowerMacs on launch day.

By July 1993, the game's development was behind schedule; only the above-ground portions of the pyramid were complete. Jones put in eighteen-hour days for the month leading up to the MacWorld Expo, where the game was to be sold. He finished the game in a relatively bug-free state just before the Expo, and Bungie had 500 shrinkwrapped copies of the game available for sale at MacWorld. Due to the game's difficulty, Bungie published an official hint book.

== Reception ==
Pathways was positively received. Inside Mac Games reviewer Jon Blum wrote that Pathways was "one of the best Macintosh games I've ever played". Computer Gaming World described Pathways as "a dungeon crawl, pure and simple". The magazine praised the "simple, elegant and easy to use" user interface and "excellent" graphics and sound. Computer Gaming World concluded that while "somewhat weak on actual game play", Pathways was "a job worthy of a strong recommendation". Macworld's Steven Levy commented that the gameplay and graphics were extremely smooth. He singled out the creatures for specific praise, likening them to "something that might have come from a brain-merge of Tim Burton, Anne Rice and Hieronymus Bosch" instead of simple line drawings. Criticisms of the game included the difficulty level; Blum found some segments too difficult and that it was possible to spend hours playing before realizing that the player had made an irreversible mistake. Reviewers also found the limited number of save spots and sparse ammunition frustrating. Jones admitted that the game was harder than he had intended. The title received several awards, including Inside Mac Games' "Adventure Game of the Year" and Macworld's "Best Role-Playing Game", and was listed on the MacUser 100.

Pathways sold more than 20,000 copies, beating expectations and making it Bungie's first commercial success. It was the third bestselling Macintosh title of the first half of 1994 after Myst and Sim City 2000, with projected seven-figure sales for the year. The game made Bungie enough money that the company was able to move from Seropian's apartment to a dedicated office in Chicago's South Side. At their new location, the Bungie team expanded and began work on another first-person shooter, Marathon. Interviewed by Inside Mac Games, Jones said that he did not believe that there would ever be a sequel to Pathways. "There's a lot of reasons for that, one of them being that I tend to dislike sequels," he said, "A lot of cool things have happened with the rendering technology since Pathways shipped, and it suggests some different products which don't really fit into the Pathways world."

Pathways would later be bundled in a box set with the Marathon series in 1997. A Mac OS X port of the game was produced by Man Up Time Studios in 2013, members of whom were early Bungie fans that became acquainted with the company through Pathways. A community made conversion to the Aleph One source port has also been produced.
