= Bungie =

American video game developer

Bungie, Inc.
- Logo used since 2009
- Formerly: Bungie Software Products Corporation (1991–2000); Bungie Studios (2000–2007); Bungie, LLC (2007–2011)
- Type: Subsidiary
- Industry: Video games
- Founded: May 1991; 35 years ago in Chicago, Illinois, U.S.
- Founders: Alex Seropian; Jason Jones
- Headquarters: Bellevue, Washington, U.S.
- Key people: Poria Torkan (studio head)
- Products: List of Bungie video games
- Number of employees: 500 est. (2026)
- Parent: Microsoft Game Studios; (2000–2007); Sony Interactive Entertainment; (2022–present)
- ASN: 394073
- Website: bungie.net

Bungie, Inc. is an American video game company based in Bellevue, Washington, and a subsidiary of Sony Interactive Entertainment. The company was established in May 1991 by Alex Seropian, who later brought in programmer Jason Jones after publishing Jones's game Minotaur: The Labyrinths of Crete. Originally based in Chicago, Illinois, the company concentrated on Macintosh games during its early years and created two successful video game franchises called Marathon and Myth. An offshoot studio, Bungie West, produced Oni, published in 2001 and owned by Take-Two Interactive, which held a 19.9% ownership stake at the time.

Microsoft acquired Bungie in 2000, and its project Halo: Combat Evolved was repurposed as a launch title for Microsoft's Xbox console. Halo became the Xbox's "killer app", selling millions of copies and spawning the Halo franchise. On October 5, 2007, Bungie announced that it had split from Microsoft and become a privately held independent company, Bungie LLC, while Microsoft retained ownership of the Halo franchise intellectual property. It signed a ten-year publishing deal with Activision in April 2010. Its first project under this deal was the 2014 first-person shooter, Destiny, which was followed by Destiny 2 in 2017. In January 2019, Bungie announced it was ending the partnership, and would take over publishing for Destiny.

Sony Interactive Entertainment completed its acquisition of Bungie in July 2022, valued at $3.6 billion, with Bungie remaining a multi-platform studio and publisher. Bungie continued to develop expansions for Destiny 2, as well as putting significant development into a Marathon reboot, an extraction shooter based on its earlier Marathon series. Latter expansions for Destiny 2 caused player count to decline, and Marathon had failed to capture the anticipated numbers at release, leading Sony to issue a $765 million impairment for its 2025 fiscal year. By May 2026, Bungie announced it was ending live service updates for Destiny 2, and Sony issued significant layoffs of the Destiny 2 team to focus the studio on Marathon. By September the same year, Bungie reversed its decision to end updates for Destiny 2, while also outlining plans to evolve Marathon beyond its extraction shooter basis.

Among Bungie's side projects is Bungie.net, the company's website, which includes company information, forums, and statistics-tracking and integration with many of its games. Bungie.net serves as the platform from which Bungie sells company-related merchandise out of the Bungie Store and runs other projects, including Bungie Aerospace, a charitable organization called The Bungie Foundation, a podcast, and online publications about game topics.

== History ==
=== Background and founding (1990–1993) ===
Logo used from 1990 to 1992

In the early 1990s, Alex Seropian was pursuing a mathematics degree at the University of Chicago, as the university did not offer undergraduate degrees in computer science. Living at home shortly before graduation, his father's wishes for him to get a job convinced Seropian to start his own game company instead.

Seropian's first video game was a Pong clone, written and released nearly 20 years after the original, called Gnop! (Pong spelled backwards). The game was created in 1990, almost a year before Bungie's official incorporation, but was released under the Bungie name and is considered by Bungie as its first game. Seropian released Gnop! free of charge, but sold the source code for the game for US$15. Gnop! was later included in several compilations of early Bungie games, including the Marathon Trilogy Box Set and the Mac Action Sack.

Logo used from 1992 to 1994

Seropian officially founded Bungie Software Products Corporation in May 1991 to publish Operation: Desert Storm. Seropian culled funding from friends and family, assembling the game boxes and writing the disks himself. Operation: Desert Storm sold 2,500 copies, and Seropian looked for another game to publish.

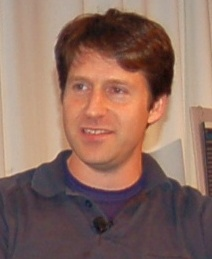
Alex Seropian in 2008

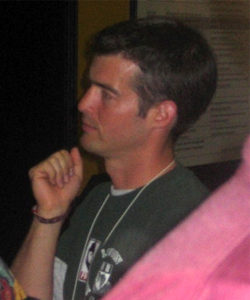
Jason Jones in 2006

Seropian met programmer Jason Jones in an artificial intelligence course at the University of Chicago. Jones was a longtime programmer who was porting a game he wrote, called Minotaur, from an Apple II to the Macintosh platform. Jones recalled, "I didn't really know [Alex] in the class. I think he actually thought I was a dick because I had a fancy computer". Seropian and Jones partnered to release the role-playing video game as Minotaur: The Labyrinths of Crete in 1992; while Jones finished the coding, Seropian handled design and publicity. The game relied on then-uncommon internet modems and AppleTalk connections for play and sold around 2,500 copies, and developed a devoted following. Both Seropian and Jones are considered co-founders of Bungie.

The team focused on the Macintosh platform, as opposed to Windows-based personal computers, because the Mac market was more open and Jones had been raised on the platform. While Jones was responsible for many of the creative and technical aspects, Seropian was a businessman and marketer. "What I liked about [Seropian] was that he never wasted any money", Jones recalled. With no money to hire other personnel, the two assembled Minotaur boxes by hand in Seropian's apartment. While the pair remained low on funds—Seropian's wife was largely supporting him—the modest success of Minotaur gave the duo enough money to develop another project.

Logo used from 1994 to 2009

Inspired by the shooter game Wolfenstein 3D, Jones wrote a 3D game engine for the Mac. Bungie's next game was intended to be a 3D port of Minotaur, but Jones and Seropian found that Minotaur's top-down perspective gameplay did not translate well to the 3D perspective, and did not want to rely on modems. Instead, they developed a new storyline for the first-person shooter that became Pathways into Darkness, released in 1993. Jones did the coding, with his friend Colin Brent creating the game's art. The game was a critical and commercial success, winning awards including Inside Mac Games' "Adventure Game of the Year" and Macworld's "Best Role-Playing Game".

Pathways beat sales expectations and became Bungie's first commercial success. Bungie moved from a one-bedroom apartment to a studio in Chicago's South Side on South Halsted Street; Seropian and Jones's first full-time employee, Doug Zartman, joined in May 1994 to provide support for Pathways, but became Bungie's public relations person, honing Bungie's often sophomoric sense of humor and irreverence. Bungie composer Martin O'Donnell remembered that the studio's location, a former girls' school next to a crack house, "smelled like a frat house after a really long weekend" and reminded staff of a locale from the Silent Hill horror video games.

=== Marathon, Myth and Oni (1994–2001) ===
Bungie's next project began as a sequel to Pathways into Darkness, but evolved into a futuristic first-person shooter called Marathon. Pathways had taught Bungie the importance of story in a game, and Marathon featured computer terminals where players could choose to learn more about the game's fiction. The studio became what one employee termed "your stereotypical vision of a small computer-game company—eating a lot of pizza, drinking a lot of Coke" while the development team worked 14 hours every day for nearly six months.

After showing the game at the Macworld Expo, Bungie was mobbed with interest and orders for the game. The game was not finished until December 14, 1994; Jones and a few other employees spent a day at a warehouse assembling boxes so that some of the orders could be filled before Christmas. The game was a critical and commercial success, and is regarded as a relatively unknown but important part of gaming history. It served as the Mac alternative to DOS PC-only games like Doom and System Shock. The game's volume of orders was unprecedented for the studio, who found that its old method of mail or phone orders could not scale to the demand and hired another company to handle the tens of thousands of orders. Marathon also brought Bungie attention from press outside the small Mac gaming market.

The first game's success led to a sequel, Marathon 2: Durandal. The series introduced several elements, including cooperative mode, which made their way to later Bungie games. The game was released November 24, 1995, and outsold its predecessor. When Bungie announced its intention to port the game to the Windows 95 operating system, however, many Mac players felt betrayed, and Bungie received a flood of negative mail. Seropian saw the value of moving into new markets and partnering with larger supply chains, although he lamented the difficult terms and "sucky" contracts distributors provided. The game was released on Windows 95 in September 1996. Marathon Infinity was released the following year.

After Marathon, Bungie moved away from first-person shooters to release a strategy game, Myth: The Fallen Lords. The game stressed tactical unit management as opposed to the resource gathering model of other combat strategy titles. The Myth games won several awards and spawned a large and active online community. Myth: The Fallen Lords was the first Bungie game to be released simultaneously for both Mac and Windows platforms.

The success of Myth enabled Bungie to change Chicago offices and establish a San Jose, California based branch of the studio, Bungie West, in 1997. Bungie West's first and only game would be Oni, an action title for the Mac, PC and PlayStation 2.

=== Halo and Microsoft acquisition (2001–2007) ===
In 1999, Bungie announced its next product, Halo: Combat Evolved, originally intended to be a third-person shooter game for Windows and Macintosh. Halo's public unveiling occurred at the Macworld Expo 1999 keynote address by Apple's then-interim-CEO Steve Jobs (after a closed-door screening at E3 in 1999).

On June 19, 2000, on the ninth anniversary of Bungie's founding, Microsoft announced that it had acquired Bungie and that Bungie would become a part of the Microsoft Game Division. Halo would be developed as an exclusive first-person shooter title for the Xbox. The reasons for Bungie accepting Microsoft's offer were varied. Jones stated that "I don't remember the details exactly, it was all a blur. We'd been talking to people for years and years—before we even published Marathon, Activision made a serious offer. But the chance to work on Xbox—the chance to work with a company that took the games seriously. Before that we worried that we'd get bought by someone who just wanted Mac ports or didn't have a clue". Martin O'Donnell, who had joined Bungie as an employee ten days before the merger was announced, remembers that the stability of the Xbox as a development platform was not the only benefit. Shortly before Myth II's release, it was discovered versions of the game could erase a player's hard drive; the glitch led to a massive recall of the games right before they shipped, which cost Bungie nearly one million dollars. O'Donnell stated in a Bungie podcast that this recall created some financial uncertainty, although accepting the offer was not something Bungie "had to do". Seropian and Jones had refused to accept Microsoft's offer until the entire studio agreed to the buyout.

As a result of the buyout, the rights to Myth and Oni were transferred to Take-Two Interactive (which at the time owned 19.9% of the studio) as part of the three-way deal between Microsoft, Bungie and Take-Two Interactive; most of the original Oni developers were able to continue working on Oni until its release in 2001. Halo: Combat Evolved, meanwhile, went on to become a critically acclaimed hit, selling more than 6.5 million copies, and becoming the Xbox's flagship franchise.

Halo's success led to Bungie creating three sequels. Halo 2 was released on November 9, 2004, making more than $125 million on release day and setting a record in the entertainment industry. In order to complete Halo 2 in time, Bungie were forced to cancel Project Phoenix, a voxel-based RTS and spiritual successor to Myth that had been in development since around 1999 with an unclear direction, and merge its team with the Halo team. Halo 3 was released on September 25, 2007, and surpassed Halo 2's records, making $170 million in its first twenty-four hours of release.

=== Buyout and Destiny (2007–2022) ===
On October 1, 2007, Microsoft and Bungie announced that Bungie was splitting off from its parent and becoming a privately held limited liability company named Bungie, LLC. As outlined in a deal between the two, Microsoft would retain a minority stake and continue to partner with Bungie on publishing and marketing both Halo and future projects, with the Halo intellectual property belonging to Microsoft.

While Bungie planned on revealing a new game at E3 2008, Bungie studio head Harold Ryan announced that the unveiling was canceled. Almost three months later, Bungie announced that the new game was a prequel and expansion to Halo 3 titled Halo 3: Recon. The next month, Bungie changed the game's title from Halo 3: Recon to Halo 3: ODST. At E3 2009, Bungie and Microsoft revealed the company was developing another Halo-related game, Halo: Reach, for release in 2010. Reach was the last game in the Halo franchise to be developed by Bungie.

Bungie continued expanding, though it did not commit to details about new projects and ship dates. The company grew from roughly 120 employees in May 2008 to 165 in June 2009, outgrowing the studio Microsoft developed. Ryan helped redesign a former multiplex movie theater in Bellevue into new Bungie offices, with 80,000 square feet (7,400 m^{2}) replacing the 41,000 square feet (3,800 m^{2}) the company occupied previously.

In April 2010, Bungie announced that it was entering into a 10-year publishing agreement with publisher Activision Blizzard. Under Bungie's agreement with Activision, new intellectual property developed by Bungie will be owned by Bungie, not Activision, in a deal similar to the Electronic Arts Partners Program.

On June 30, 2011, Bungie announced the "Bungie Aerospace" project; its slogan, "Per audacia ad astra", translates to "Boldly to the stars". The project is intended to provide independent game developers with publishing, resources, and support, including access to the Bungie.net platform. In November 2011, Bungie Aerospace published its first game, Crimson: Steam Pirates, for iOS, developed by startup video game developer Harebrained Schemes. In addition to publishing and distributing Crimson, Bungie Aerospace provided players with statistical support and a dedicated discussion forum on Bungie.net.

In 2013, Bungie announced Destiny, which launched for the PlayStation 3, PlayStation 4, Xbox 360, and Xbox One platforms on September 9, 2014. During January 2016, Ryan stepped down as president and Pete Parsons, who had been the company's chief operating officer and executive producer since 2002, became its chief executive officer.

Chinese video game conglomerate NetEase had invested $100 million into Bungie in 2018, in exchange for a minority stake in the company and a seat on the company's board of directors.

Bungie terminated its publishing deal with Activision in 2019, after eight years; as per their agreement, Bungie retained all rights to Destiny and will self-publish future installments and expansions. This included transitioning Destiny 2 from using Activision's Battle.net to Steam. Bungie's communications director David Dague dispelled ideas that Activision was a "prohibitive overlord" that limited Bungie's creative control, and instead stated that both companies amicably split due to different ideas of where the Destiny franchise should head.

Bungie announced a major expansion of its firm in February 2021. In addition to more than doubling its headquarters space in Bellevue, Washington, Bungie announced plans to open a new studio in Amsterdam by 2022. This would support additional staff not only for Destiny but additional media related to Destiny outside of video games, as well as a new intellectual property unrelated to Destiny that Bungie expects to release by 2025.

=== Acquisition by Sony Interactive Entertainment (2022–present) ===
On January 31, 2022, Sony Interactive Entertainment announced its intent to acquire Bungie for $3.6 billion. While Bungie would become part of the PlayStation family of studios it would remain an independent subsidiary under Sony in development and publishing and would not be part of PlayStation Studios. Instead, Sony's investment would help Bungie with hiring for developers to expand its work on the Destiny franchise and other planned games. Both companies stated that the deal would not affect platform availability or exclusivity for Destiny 2 but instead was geared towards media beyond video games that Bungie had been interested in pursuing for some time. Bungie, in return, would help Sony enter the live service games market, as Sony had announced plans to launch at least ten such games by 2026 in an investors' presentation following the Bungie acquisition announcement. Sony also said the Bungie acquisition will help Sony to become more multiplatform.

Of the $3.6 billion, Sony anticipated that at least $1.2 billion will be used as incentives for retention of Bungie's current employees. In May, it was reported that the Federal Trade Commission was opening an inquiry into the acquisition, requesting more information about it a week prior. It was expected to delay the acquisition by at least six months. The acquisition was closed by July 15, 2022, making Bungie a subsidiary under Sony Interactive Entertainment.

Bungie laid off approximately 100 of 1,200 employees on October 30, 2023, part of a larger cost-cutting measure across all Sony studios. According to Bloomberg News, revenue from Destiny 2 fell by 45% over the previous year due to waning popularity of the game, and work on the next major expansion The Final Shape was not progressing as well as expected. As part of these layoffs, The Final Shape was delayed from February 2024 to June 2024, while its next game, Marathon was pushed into 2025.

Bungie announced the layoffs of 220 staff in July 2024, leaving about 850 employees remaining. Future plans include transitioning 155 more into Sony directly. Parsons stated that it had to make this decision "after exhausting all other mitigation options", and that these layoffs would allow it "to refocus our studio and our business with more realistic goals and viable Financials", with focus on Destiny and Marathon going forward. Additionally, one of the unannounced games in a new IP that Bungie was developing will be transitioned to a new studio under PlayStation Studios, later revealed to be teamLFG in May 2025. According to journalist Jason Schreier in speaking with those at Bungie, the two rounds of layoffs had resulted from Bungie trying to explore too many new projects too quickly shortly after the Sony acquisition, hiring several new staff and drawing off Destiny developers to pursue these projects, with the expectation from management that it would be able to pull through with "Bungie magic" that the studio had been known for. The following October, the Creative Studios arm of Bungie was moved and integrated into PlayStation Studios to help support other Sony live service games, though it would also continue to support Destiny and Marathon.

Bungie had 1,600 employees prior to the first round of layoffs in October 2023, according to former chief legal officer Don McGowan. This indicates that the company has lost over 750 employees in less than a year. Also, several teams at Bungie has transitioned over to Sony PlayStation as part of Bungie's integration into Sony. After a second round of layoffs in July 2024, several high-ranking executives seem to have departed, including Chief Creative Officer Jonny Ebbert and Chief Strategy Officer Ondraus Jenkins.

The launch of the Edge of Fate expansion for Destiny 2 in July 2025 had not brought a significant increase in player numbers, and had the lowest player count on Steam compared to all previous expansions. According to Phil Savage of PC Gamer, this was due to a combination of issues with Bungie management and company morale, questionable decisions with the direction of Destiny 2 including the content vaulting, and toxicity within the Destiny 2 community that arose from these elements. With its quarterly earnings report in August 2025, Sony CFO Lin Tao said as part of an ongoing process, Bungie was being shifted away from being independent towards having a role within PlayStation Studios as part of structural reform within Sony. Parsons announced his departure as CEO of Bungie on August 21, 2025, with Justin Truman, the general manager for Destiny 2, taking his place.

In its November 2025 financial report, Sony said that "level of sales and user engagement [of Destiny 2] have not reached the expectation [it] had at the time of the acquisition of Bungie", and was taking a impairment loss of about $204.2 million due to that. Sony affirmed a total $765 million impairment loss for the fiscal year ending March 31, 2026, related to underperformance from Bungie. Bungie announced on May 21, 2026 that the upcoming June 9 update would be the final live service content for the game, after which it would remain online and playable as with the original Destiny. Jason Schreier of Bloomberg News said that there was no active plans for a Destiny followup with Sony focusing the studio on Marathon, and layoffs were expected after the last content update. Sony announced these layoffs on June 25, 2026, laying off most of the Destiny team along with a portion of the Marathon team, as "necessary to align the studio's resources with its current priorities and long-term goals". Bungie reported nearly 300 people were impacted by the layoffs to the Washington State government.

In September 2026, Bungie stated that they recognize issues raised by players of both Destiny and Marathon, and announced they would be focusing on addressing these. In the case of Destiny, they announced future plans to unvault content, including destinations, strikes, and raids, that had been previously vaulted in the Destiny Content Vault in 2020, which they said would help set a framework for future games going forward. With Marathon, they admitted the game did not draw as many players as expected, and are working to provide more ways to play it beyond the extraction shooter basis to allow players to experience the Marathon world in a variety of fashions.

== Bungie.net ==
Bungie.net serves as the main portal for interaction between company staff and the community surrounding Bungie's games. When Bungie was bought by Microsoft, the site was seen as in competition with Microsoft's own Xbox.com site, but community management eventually won out as the bigger concern. The site has been redesigned several times.

During Bungie's involvement with the Halo franchise, the site recorded statistics for each game played. This information included statistics on each player in the game, and a map of the game level showing where kills occurred, called "heatmaps". On January 31, 2012, Bungie announced that, as of March 31, 2012, Bungie.net would no longer update Halo game statistics and Halo player service records, host new user-generated Halo content, or operate Halo's "Bungie Pro" service. Bungie's cessation of these services on March 31 completed the transition process of all data for Halo games being managed by 343 Industries. Bungie.net records player's statistics for its game franchise Destiny. In addition to the collection of data and the management of Destiny player's accounts, the website serves as a form of communication between Bungie and the community.

While Bungie had long provided places for fans to congregate and talk about games, as well as releasing new information and screenshots over Bungie.net, it historically had made less effort and been less successful at providing access to the inside workings of Bungie and its staff. As part of a move to become more familiar with fans, Bungie recruited recognized and respected voices from the fan community, including writers Luke Smith, Eric Osborne, and others.

Bungie also has an iOS and Google Play application that provides news, inventory management, and group finding for its game Destiny on the go.

Bungie.net also hosted the Bungie store, where players could purchase physical merchandise for Bungie's games. As part of the reorganization in September 2026, Bungie announced they were shutting down the Bungie store but would be bringing back a new storefront "more aligned with our current goals and vision".

== Culture ==
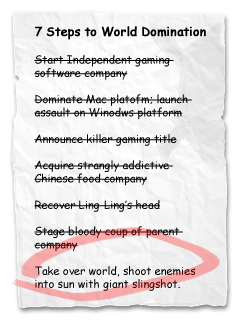
The "Seven Steps for World Domination", an example of the work culture of Bungie

Martin O'Donnell described Bungie's workplace culture as "a slightly irreverent attitude, and not corporate, bureaucratic or business-focused"; artist Shi Kai Wang noted that when he walked into Bungie for an interview, "I realized that I was the one who was over-dressed, [and] I knew this was the place I wanted to work". Bungie's content manager and podcast host, Frank O'Connor, comically noted that at a GameStop conference, the Bungie team was told to wear business casual, to which O'Connor replied "We [Bungie] don't do business casual".

This informal, creative culture was one of the reasons Microsoft was interested in acquiring Bungie, although game designer Jordan Weisman said that Microsoft came close to destroying the company's development culture, as it had with the now-defunct FASA Studio. Studio head Harold Ryan emphasized that even when Bungie was bought by Microsoft, the team was still independent:

One of the first things [Microsoft] tried after acquiring Bungie, after first attempting to fully assimilate them, was to move Bungie into a standard Microsoft building with the rest of the game group. But unlike the rest of the teams they'd brought in previously, Bungie didn't move into Microsoft corporate offices – we tore all of the walls out of that section of the building and sat in a big open environment. Luckily Alex and Jason [Seropian and Jones, Bungie's founders] were pretty steadfast at the time about staying somewhat separate and isolated.

In 2007, Microsoft eventually moved the studio to Kirkland, Washington, where it reincorporated as Bungie, Inc. Despite the move, financial analyst Roger Ehrenberg declared the Bungie-Microsoft marriage "doomed to fail" due to these fundamental differences. Bungie also pointed out that it was tired of new intellectual property being cast aside to work on the Halo franchise. Edge described the typical Bungie employee as "simultaneously irreverent and passionately loyal; fiercely self-critical; full of excitement at the company's achievements, no matter how obscure; [and] recruited from its devoted fanbase".

The Bungie workplace is highly informal, with new and old staff willing to challenge each other on topics, such as fundamental game elements. Staff are able to publicly criticize their own games and each other. Fostering studio cooperation and competition, Bungie holds events such as the "Bungie Pentathlon", in which staff square off in teams playing games such as Halo, Pictionary, Dance Dance Revolution, and Rock Band. Bungie also faced off against professional eSports teams and other game studios in Halo during "Humpdays", with the results of the multiplayer matches being posted on Bungie.net.

Bungie's staff and fans, known as the "Seventh Column", have banded together for charity and other causes. After Hurricane Katrina, Bungie was one of several game companies to announce its intention to help those affected by the hurricane, with Bungie donating the proceeds of special T-shirts to the American Red Cross; after the 2010 Haiti earthquake, Bungie sold "Be a Hero" T-shirts and donated money to the Red Cross for every Halo 3 or ODST player on Xbox Live who wore a special heart-shaped emblem. Other charity work Bungie has done included auctioning off a painting of "Mister Chief" by O'Connor, a Halo 2 soda machine from Bungie's offices, and collaborating with Child's Play auctions. In 2011, Bungie formed a nonprofit organization, named Bungie Foundation.

In December 2021, IGN reported from interviews with 26 former and current employees that there had been past and some current issues with a male-dominated work culture and crunch time that was discriminatory towards female employees since around 2011, but the company more recently had been working to improve these issues, previously parting ways with the majority of people mentioned in the article. Parsons wrote a response about Bungie's commitment to improve the workplace culture, which had aligned with statements from more recent employees that had spoken to IGN. Parsons apologized to any employee who "ever experienced anything less than a safe, fair, and professional working environment at Bungie", and stated of several efforts that the company was making to eliminate any type of "rockstar" attitude that may exist at the studio.

== Games developed ==
Year	Title	Platform
1990	Gnop!	Classic Mac OS
1991	Operation: Desert Storm	Classic Mac OS
1992	Minotaur: The Labyrinths of Crete	Classic Mac OS
1993	Pathways into Darkness	Classic Mac OS
1994	Marathon	Apple Pippin (as Super Marathon), Classic Mac OS
1995	Marathon 2: Durandal	Apple Pippin (as Super Marathon), Classic Mac OS, Microsoft Windows, Xbox 360
1996	Marathon Infinity	Classic Mac OS
1997	Myth: The Fallen Lords	Classic Mac OS, Microsoft Windows
1998	Myth II: Soulblighter	Classic Mac OS, Microsoft Windows, Linux
2001	Oni	Classic Mac OS, macOS, Microsoft Windows, PlayStation 2
2001	Halo: Combat Evolved	macOS, Microsoft Windows, Xbox
2004	Halo 2	Microsoft Windows, Xbox
2007	Halo 3	Xbox 360, Xbox One, Microsoft Windows
2009	Halo 3: ODST	Xbox 360, Xbox One, Microsoft Windows
2010	Halo: Reach	Xbox 360, Xbox One, Microsoft Windows
2014	Destiny	PlayStation 3, PlayStation 4, Xbox 360, Xbox One
2017	Destiny 2	Microsoft Windows, PlayStation 4, PlayStation 5, Xbox One, Xbox Series X/S, Stadia
2026	Marathon	Microsoft Windows, PlayStation 5, Xbox Series X/S

In addition to games, Bungie has developed its own game engine, originally named the Blam Engine for the Halo games, and then heavily modified and renamed as the Tiger Engine for Destiny.

== Legal issues ==
=== AimJunkies lawsuit ===
Bungie had initiated legal action against AimJunkies, a group owned by Phoenix Digital that sold software that allowed for cheating in Destiny 2, in 2021, asserting copyright infringement, violations of the Digital Millennium Copyright Act (DMCA), and trafficking in DMCA-violating software; Bungie's initial claims were dismissed but an amended lawsuit allowed the case to proceed. AimJunkies attempted to countersue on claims that Bungie has hacked into the computer of the user that had developed these cheats, but those were dismissed in 2022. At trial, judge Thomas Samuel Zilly ruled that Bungie lacked sufficient evidence to allow the DMCA and trafficking claims to move forward but instead sent these complaints to arbitration, where Bungie was awarded $4.3 million in damages. The copyright claims proceeded to a jury trial, which found for Bungie in May 2024. While Bungie was only awarded around $63,000, the revenue made by the sale of the cheat programs by AimJunkies, the result was considered to be significant as it was the first time a jury trial ruled in game cheating software and could carry as case law in future lawsuits. AimJunkies asserted its plan to appeal both the arbitration and trial judgement.

In August 2024, Thomas Zilly, Seattle-based U.S. District Judge, denied AimJunkies motion for a new trial. Separately, in the same month, the Ninth Circuit Court denied an appeal.

=== Plagiarism lawsuit ===
In October 2024, Kelsey Martineau sued Bungie in the United States District Court for the Eastern District of Louisiana on claims that the "Red War" narrative from the launch of Destiny 2 was lifted from a work he wrote on Wordpress in 2013 and 2014. The lawsuit was filed after Bungie had sunsetted the "Red War" content, and to defend its position to the court to demonstrate how "Red War" differed substantially from Martineau's work, it had submitted YouTube videos from popular Destiny 2 content creators made before the sunsetting and pages from a Destiny fan wiki as part of a motion to dismiss the case. The judge, Susie Morgan, ruled in May 2025 that she could not accept this evidence to support Bungie's motion, allowing the case to proceed. By November 2025, both parties had reached a settlement on undisclosed terms.

=== Unlicensed art use ===
There have been four known incidents where independent artists have found their work used by Bungie in its games without their permission or knowledge.

- Part of a Destiny 2 in-game cut scene for content released in 2021 included a work that had been drawn by online artist Mal E in 2020 without the artist's knowledge. Bungie reached out to Mal E, and later affirmed they had obtained permission and included proper credit within the game for its use.
- A similar situation occurred in 2023, when artist Julian Faylona had discovered an image within a Destiny 2 cutscene nearly mirrored work they previously created in 2020. Bungie said the cut scene had been developed by one of its support studios, and it worked to properly compensate Faylona.
- When partnering with Nerf to release a Nerf Ace of Spades gun based on that used by popular character Cayde-6, artist Tofu_Rabbit discovered the designs of the Nerf version, while it had swapped colors, used several of the same art elements such as wearing, smudges, and scratches of the gun's frame that had been in its own 2015 design. Bungie affirmed the design had been done by Nerf and was working to compensate Tofu_Rabbit for the situation and credit their contribution.
- In May 2025, online artist Antireal demonstrated that Bungie had used art she had created in 2017 as art assets within the 2025 Marathon game, after the game had completed its first open beta. Bungie, after investigating, affirmed that a former art developer for the game has used Antireal's art without permission, promising to work with Antireal to correct the situation, and was performing a full evaluation of all of the art assets in Marathon to verify their originality within Bungie.

== Related companies ==
Many of Bungie's employees have left the company to form their own studios. Double Aught was a short-lived company composed of several former Bungie team members, founded by Greg Kirkpatrick. Seropian left to form Wideload Games, developer of Stubbs the Zombie in Rebel Without a Pulse, and later co-founded Industrial Toys. Other companies include Giant Bite, founded by Hamilton Chu (producer on Halo and Oni) and Michael Evans (project lead on Oni), and Certain Affinity, founded by Max Hoberman (the multiplayer design lead for Halo 2 and Halo 3). Certain Affinity's team included former Bungie employees David Bowman and Chad Armstrong (who later returned to Bungie). The studio collaborated with Bungie in releasing the last two downloadable maps for Halo 2 and the downloadable Defiant Map Pack for Halo: Reach. 343 Industries, a game studio formed by Microsoft to manage the Halo series following the launch of Halo: Reach, also includes a few former Bungie employees, including Frank O'Connor. In 2015, long-time Bungie employee Martin O'Donnell started a new game studio known as Highwire Games. In 2016, former Bungie CEO and studio head Harold Ryan founded a new game studio known as ProbablyMonsters.
