= Jason Jones (programmer) =

American video game developer and programmer

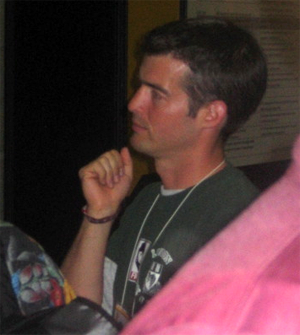
- Jason Jones at the Electronic Entertainment Expo in May 2006
- Born: June 1, 1971 (age 55); United States
- Education: University of Chicago
- Occupations: Video game developer, programmer
- Employer(s): Bungie (1991–2026); Stone Kite (2026–present)
- Known for: Co-founder of Bungie, co-creator of Marathon, Myth, Halo, and Destiny

Jason Jones (born June 1, 1971) is an American video game developer and programmer who co-founded the video game studio Bungie with Alex Seropian in 1991. Jones began programming on Apple computers in high school, assembling a multiplayer game called Minotaur: The Labyrinths of Crete. While attending the University of Chicago, Jones met Seropian and the two formed a partnership to publish Minotaur.

Following the modest success of Minotaur, Jones programmed Bungie's next game, Pathways into Darkness, and worked on code, level design and story development for Bungie's Marathon and Myth series. For Bungie's next projects, Halo: Combat Evolved and Halo 2, Jones took on a more managerial role as project lead. He served as director on the 2014 video game Destiny. In 2026, he cofounded a new studio, Stone Kite, to work on transmedia projects.

== Early life ==
Jones became interested in programming in high school and learned Applesoft BASIC and 6502 Assembly on an Apple II. When Apple released its Macintosh line, Jones's family purchased a Macintosh 128K, but Jones never programmed much for it. After high school Jones got a job programming for a computer-aided design company on PCs, before going to college the next year. In his off time Jones said that all he ever did on the Apple II was write games, "and it seemed logical to continue that on the Mac," he said. "The first thing I did on the Mac was to port a modem game I'd written called Minotaur from 6502 Assembly on the Apple II into MPW C on the Mac. I was still finishing that when I came to college. By that time, I knew I wanted to write games."

== Career ==
Jones met Alex Seropian in his second year at the University of Chicago. In 1991 Seropian had founded Bungie and published his own game, Operation: Desert Storm. Seropian was looking for another game to publish, and they decided to work together to finish Minotaur. While Seropian did design and marketing, Jones finished the programming. Minotaur: The Labyrinths of Crete shipped in April 1992; while the game sold only around 2,500 copies (it required a then-rare modem for network play), it developed a devoted following. After publishing Minotaur, Jones and Seropian formed a partnership; "What I liked about him was that he never wasted any money", Jones said of his partner.

Bungie focused on the Mac platform due to familiarity with the platform and ease of use. "The PC market was really cutthroat, but the Mac market was all friendly and lame. So it was easier to compete," Jones said. After Minotaur, Bungie began work on a 3D graphics version of the game, but realized that the game's format was not suited to a 3D environment. Instead, Jones and Seropian wrote a brand-new story for what became Pathways Into Darkness. Since Bungie had no money and Jones was the only one with the available time, he single-handedly coded the game on a Macintosh IIfx, passing art chores to his friend Colin Brent. Pathways was successful enough that Bungie moved from a one-bedroom apartment to an actual office.

Bungie's next project started as an update of Pathways but evolved into a science fiction shooter game, Marathon. The game included state-of-the-art graphics, network multiplayer, and voice support, and won a number of awards on release in 1994. Jones recalled that he was surprised anyone ever completed the game and sought to atone for some of its shortcomings with its sequel, Marathon 2: Durandal, which was also released for Microsoft Windows. The Marathon series was followed by a series of real-time tactics games, starting with Myth: The Fallen Lords in 1996.

Bungie continued to expand, and in 1997 work began on a new project, codenamed Blam! (Jones had changed the name from Monkey Nuts because he could not bring himself to tell his mother about the new game under that title.) Blam! evolved from a real-time strategy game to a third-person shooter to a first-person shooter called Halo: Combat Evolved. Jones role in development was unlike Marathon and Myth, where Jones was involved in developing more than half the levels and much to most of the story. Instead, he was the project lead and a manager, barely providing any code to the game. He would read war journals by authors such as John Kinkead and Winston Churchill.

In 2000, Microsoft acquired Bungie, moving the team from Chicago to Washington State. Jones recalled that the buyout was a "blur [...] We'd been talking to people for years and years—before we even published Marathon, Activision made a serious offer [to buy us]. But the chance to work on [the Microsoft Xbox console]—the chance to work with a company that took the games seriously. Before that we worried that we'd get bought by someone who just wanted Mac ports or didn't have a clue." Around the same time, a glitch in versions of Myth II was found to entirely erase a player's hard drive; this led to a massive recall of the games right before they shipped, costing Bungie nearly one million dollars. Composer Martin O'Donnell said that this recall created financial uncertainty in the studio, though accepting the offer was not something "Bungie had to do." Jones and Seropian refused to accept Microsoft's offer until the entire studio agreed to the buyout.

Combat Evolved was highly successful, selling more than a million units in its first six months and driving Xbox sales. Jones led the development team that created its sequel, Halo 2, and served as director on a new video game series, Destiny. He was listed in Next Generation's top 100 Developers in 2006 and 2007.

After the release of Halo 2, Jones took a sabbatical from Bungie, not knowing whether he wanted to continue making games. As Jones returned, his involvement with Halo began to diminish, as Jones tended to 'dislike' sequels. He desired to build a new intellectual property. Jones worked closely with colleague Jaimie Griesemer who was working on his own internal project named "Dragon's Tavern" which Griesemer described to be a "third person fantasy game" In the end however, Jones had the most power at Bungie, despite not being the President he was the majority share-holder and his vision of the studio was his alone to decide. Ultimately, Jason got his way with the studio's next project and worked with Griesemer to combine his ideas of "Dragon's Tavern" with what would be Destiny. As development continued, and with Griesemer gone, the writing team led by Joseph Staten had created a "Super-Cut" which was essentially a summary of the game's story-line. The super-cut was poorly received by Jones and the rest of the studio. Shortly after, Jones decided to scrap the writing team's work and effectively re-write the story very late into production with Marty O'Donnell, believing it was not feasible and almost impossible to complete. Knowing the game was in peril with his proposed reboot of the story, Jones formed a group called the "Iron Bar" composed of art director Christopher Barrett, designer Luke Smith and writer Eric Raab, an experienced book editor. Jones and the rest of Bungie carried on to release Destiny on September 9, 2014. Jones reportedly left Bungie amid layoffs in June 2026.

In 2026, Jones announced the formation of a new studio, Stone Kite. Years previously, Jones began writing an oral history story about a dystopian future where artificial intelligence ran amok, working with author Margaret Stohl. Stone Kite's first venture is a comic book adapted from Jones' work, One Zero One, with the goal of releasing new issues in 2027 and expanding the universe with multimedia adaptations.
