= Operation: Desert Storm (video game) =

1991 video game

- Developer: Bungie
- Publisher: Bungie
- Designer: Alex Seropian
- Platform: Mac OS
- Release: NA: June 1991
- Genre: Military strategy
- Mode: Single-player

Operation: Desert Storm is a top-down tank shooter for the Macintosh. It is the first commercial game released by Bungie and the first game released after their incorporation. It followed the freeware title Gnop!, published by Bungie co-founder Alex Seropian under the Bungie name prior to incorporation. Operation: Desert Storm sold about 2,500 copies and was based on the events of the ongoing Gulf War.

== Gameplay ==
The game features twenty levels, culminating in a mission set in Baghdad, Iraq with the final enemy being Saddam Hussein. It comes with a glossary of military terms and trivia which was needed in order to validate the copy-protection in the game, and authentic maps of the Kuwaiti Theater of Operations.
