= Blood Gulch =

Video game multiplayer map

- Halo location
- Blood Gulch as seen from behind the base of Blue Team looking towards Red Team's base
- First appearance: Halo: Combat Evolved (2001)
- Last appearance: Halo: The Master Chief Collection (2014)
- Created by: Bungie
- Genre: First-person shooter

Blood Gulch is a multiplayer map in the first-person shooter Halo video game series. It first appeared in Halo: Combat Evolved, and was remade for Halo 2 as "Coagulation", as well as for Halo: Reach as "Hemorrhage" and Halo: The Master Chief Collection as "Bloodline". It also had spiritual successors in Halo 3's "Valhalla", in Halo 4 and Halo Wars as "Ragnarok", and in Halo 5's "Basin". Taking place in a canyon on the Halo ringworld that resembles the American Southwest, it was designed for the capture the flag game mode but can also be used for other modes, such as deathmatch. Blood Gulch was one of Halo's most critically acclaimed and influential multiplayer maps, and played a significant role in the machinima series Red vs. Blue.

== Level content ==
Blood Gulch takes place in a box canyon on a Halo ring that is enclosed on all sides by high natural walls. The canyon's interior is a "vast expanse of undulating landscape and scattered pieces of natural cover", with a base on each end for the Red and Blue teams. The map is balanced but asymmetrical in terms of tactical advantage, with the Red team having access to a ridge, while the Blue team is located near a tunnel system in the canyon wall. Each base is conducive to traditional FPS gameplay, with "two entrances, an open ceiling, and sloping paths to the roof". On top of each base, a teleporter can transport players (from either team) to the midst of the valley's no man's land, leaving them vulnerable to snipers. Warthog jeeps can easily traverse the landscape, making them ideal for escaping with the flag. In the Halo 2 variant of the map, each base has a third, below ground level, in which a Banshee can be found. When playing the gamemode “Rocket Slayer”, the Warthogs are replaced with Scorpion tanks.

== Development ==
Jaime Griesemer, the designer of Halo: Combat Evolved, stated that the design of Blood Gulch was responsible for the Scorpion tank remaining in the game, saying that the developers wanted to remove it, as it was not used in the game's campaign mode enough, but found it fun enough to drive around Blood Gulch that it was left in the game. He also stated that the game's sniper rifle was given a scope due to the distance between Blood Gulch's two bases.

== Reception ==
Wes Fenlon from PC Gamer opined that "if there's anything truly and utterly timeless about Halo, it's that voice playing over the warm blue sky and dusty fields of Blood Gulch". IGN's Ryan McCaffrey consider Coagulation, the Halo 2 iteration of Blood Gulch, to be the Halo series' arguably most famous map, "the boxed desert canyon that's been home to countless CTF matches and Red vs. Blue episodes". Edge called the map a "showcase" for Halo's "wonderful ability to segue in and out of tense firefights and moments of ridiculous slapstick". The publication praised the map for its wide open design and combination of ground combat and third-person vehicles, which, while taken for granted in the modern day, was rare at the time of Halo's release and required "a different approach to map design". In Engadget's coverage of the reveal of the Blood Gulch map returning for Halo: Reach, Richard Mitchell remarked that it is "probably the most well-remembered map in Halo history", while the version in Reach is "very familiar and very different", drawing attention to the fact that players can leave the canyon. Good Game called the map "Halo's most iconic" and said that "teamwork is at the core of the Gulch", while "the best way to experience the gulch has always been behind the wheel". GameZone called the map "easily a standout of the franchise", citing how often it has been remade across games. Ryan McCaffrey of Official Xbox Magazine called Blood Gulch "one of the best multiplayer maps to grace any first-person shooter" and praised the map's successor, Hemorrhage, that carries over the map's terrain.

Phil Spencer, head of the Xbox brand, called Blood Gulch his favorite Halo map, citing its terrain, large amount of vehicle combat and the excitement of coordinating friends to capture the flag.

Blood Gulch was recreated by a fan for the game Counter-Strike: Global Offensive, with Kotaku calling the map "very nicely done".

== In other media ==
Blood Gulch was popularized in part due to it being the main setting of the first five seasons of Red vs. Blue, a web series that first aired in the early 2000s. It was later featured in the battle royale game Fortnite. The addition was announced by Ninja and several Red vs. Blue characters.
