= The Library (Halo) =

Video game level

- Halo location
- The Library as seen in the Halo: Campaign Evolved remake, showing Master Chief being attacked by Flood.
- First appearance: Halo: Combat Evolved (2001)
- Last appearance: Halo: Campaign Evolved (2026)
- Created by: Bungie
- Genre: First-person shooter

In-universe information
- Location: Installation 04
- Characters: Master Chief; Cortana; 343 Guilty Spark; Flood (Halo)

"The Library" is the seventh level in the first-person shooter (FPS) video game Halo: Combat Evolved and its remake, Halo: Campaign Evolved. Taking place in an ancient Forerunner library within Installation 04, one of many ringworld megastructures created by the advanced alien race, the level involves Master Chief's attempt to activate the Installation's defenses and destroy the threat of the Flood with the assistance of the floating robot 343 Guilty Spark, while fending off the newly-awakened Flood monsters.

The Library has received critical and player backlash due to its controversial change in combat tactics against the Flood, its high level of difficulty, and its repetitive nature. It is often cited as the weakest part of the game, with some calling it the worst level in the entire Halo series or gaming in general. While Halo Studios attempted to improve the Library in Campaign Evolved with reworked combat encounters and added dialog, it was still criticized as poorly-designed despite the changes.

== Level content ==
The level begins with the player being teleported into a wide-open room with little cover. They are initially confronted by small Flood "infection forms" that drop down from the ceiling in waves, doing little damage but constantly swarming the player, forcing them to backpedal. In the next room, they are faced with "carrier forms" that explode when they get close to the player. "Combat forms" also use human weapons that hit instantly upon firing, increasing the difficulty in combination with the other Flood types.

Players traverse four floors of the level, each with their own distinct design, as well as various parts where they are trapped in a room waiting for 343 Guilty Spark to open the doors. Throughout the level, the Flood can ambush the player through air vents, as well as face them in pitched, scripted encounters, including one where one Flood fires a rocket launcher to detonate several others and catch the player unawares.

Campaign Evolved makes the level more linear, giving the player only a single path forward rather than a more open-ended space to explore. It also adds large organic masses that have consumed part of the level, affecting traversal.

== Reception ==
Sam Prell of GamesRadar+ compared the Library to the Star Wars prequel trilogy, saying that fans "either pretend it doesn't exist or don't say its name", and also stating that "players hated it just as much 14 years ago". He cited GameSpy as calling it "the video game equivalent of Groundhog Day", and IGN's review, which claimed that the game "hit a rut" at the very time the Library was introduced. Ryan Taljonick and Connor Sheridan of the same website called the Library a notably frustrating video game level, calling it "a generic-looking labyrinth packed with some of the most unenjoyable enemies ever devised in a first-person shooter." Saying it is "easily the worst level in pretty much any of the Halo games", they note how its identical looking rooms make it "easy to get turned around". They cite the sheer number of Flood enemies as forcing the player to exhaust all of their ammunition, overwhelming the player with "wave after wave".

Erich Sherman of GameZone called the Library "notorious [...] for being the low point of the campaign" in a retrospective, describing it as "abnormally boring and lifeless". He stated that "a less than stellar checkpoint system" further increased the difficulty and annoyance by forcing the player to repeat large chunks of the level if they died. Ludwig Kietzmann of Engadget stated that the Library was a level "people either love for being a Doom-like killing spree, or lament for being a slog through generic sci-fi corridors", noting its inclusion in Halo: Combat Evolved Anniversary. Jason Totilo of Kotaku called the level "Halo's most notorious", citing its "seemingly endless shooting in a dark library". Jeff Marchifava of Game Informer called it "the longest and most monotonous video game level ever created", and "the best security system in the galaxy" due to the fact that it "kills intruders with its sheer boredom".

On the other hand, GB Burford, also of Kotaku, offered praise for the level, calling it "a wonderful change in pace, so long as you take it on its terms", and attributing much of players' annoyance with its enemies to a lack of knowledge in how to face them. He called the level "Halo's ultimate test of skill, its final gauntlet". In a retrospective feature for GamePro, Tom Chick argued that "one of Halo's most hated levels is actually one of the best levels in any videogame"; he acknowledged that the level was widely criticised for its repetitive environments and large number of Flood encounters, but these elements contributed to its deliberate narrative purpose. He wrote that the level represented a major shift in the game's story, revealing that the conflict extended beyond the human-Covenant war and centred on the Flood and the true purpose of the Halo installations. Chick also praised the level's horror-inspired design, comparing its portrayal of the Flood outbreak to a large-scale zombie apocalypse and arguing that the encounter was an important example of environmental storytelling in games. Chick also drew attention to a climactic moment at the end of the Library level where the Master Chief is depicted as a gullible though well-intentioned soldier who is chastised by his companion Cortana for blindly following Guilty Spark's instructions to "avert a terrible disaster by plugging a key into a console". He called it the Halo series' most human moment and a contrast to the Master Chief's subsequent portrayal as an infallible war hero in later sequels.

The level's new incarnation for Campaign Evolved received attention due to Halo Studios' statements that it was being modified and improved, and that the studio was aware of the level's negative reception amongst fans and critics. Nevertheless, upon the game's release, Jade King of TheGamer played through the level and wrote that it was still the worst aspect of the game, saying that while it was somewhat improved by the new sprint function and dialog, "going up against The Flood never measures up to Brutes or Elites", while being overwhelmed by and dying to the Flood set the player back to a significant extent. She continued that while she "can’t blame Halo Studios for trying", she thought that "The Library is fundamentally flawed, and could have benefited from either a complete redesign or a fresh level altogether".

== See also ==
- Flood (Halo)
- The Silent Cartographer
