= Halo: Campaign Evolved =

- Developer: Halo Studios (Note: Original game developed by Bungie)
- Publisher: Xbox Game Studios
- Directors: Max Szalgor; Greg Hermann
- Designer: Dan Gniady
- Series: Halo
- Engine: Unreal Engine 5
- Platforms: PlayStation 5; Windows; Xbox Series X/S
- Release: July 28, 2026
- Genre: First-person shooter
- Modes: Single-player, multiplayer

Halo: Campaign Evolved is a 2026 first-person shooter game developed by Halo Studios and published by Xbox Game Studios. It is a remake of the story component of Halo: Combat Evolved (2001), the first installment of the Halo franchise originally developed by Bungie for the Xbox console. The game was released for PlayStation 5, Windows and Xbox Series X/S on July 28, 2026. Campaign Evolved commemorates the 25th anniversary of both the Halo franchise and the Xbox platform it originated on.

Developed in Unreal Engine 5, Campaign Evolved features reinterpreted visuals and new and altered levels. Mechanics, weapons, and narrative additions from other Halo games are brought to Campaign Evolved. The story cinematics and audio were also remade, featuring re-recorded dialogue from the game's principal voice cast. The game does not include Combat Evolved's original competitive multiplayer, but supports four-player online cooperative multiplayer in addition to two-player split-screen on consoles. Campaign Evolved also supports cross-platform play and cross-progression across all consoles and PC during online co-op.

343 Industries assumed control over the Halo franchise following the release of Bungie's Halo: Reach in 2010, debuting with the remastered Halo: Combat Evolved Anniversary (2011) for Xbox 360 before developing new mainline entries through Halo 4 in 2012. The development team restructured and rebranded to Halo Studios in 2024, simultaneously pivoting production of the series away from the proprietary Slipspace Engine used for Infinite towards Unreal Engine 5, and beginning work on Campaign Evolved as the inaugural game utilizing such technology as a means of introducing the series to new players in anticipation of a multiplatform release, a first for the franchise. The game was teased in 2024 before being officially announced the following year. Campaign Evolved received generally positive reviews from critics, who noted that it brought welcome updates and additions to the original campaign, but did not drastically reimagine it.

== Gameplay ==
The player character Master Chief fights enemy aliens in new campaign levels added alongside the original game's ten missions.

Halo: Campaign Evolved is a shooter game with most gameplay experienced from a first-person perspective. A remake of Halo: Combat Evolved's (2001) campaign, Campaign Evolved features redesigned missions with alterations to the level design and structure, along with new movement options and mechanics that reflect subsequent gameplay updates made in Combat Evolved's various sequels. This includes the ability to sprint, which is enabled by default but can be toggled in-game for a more faithful experience. As with Halo 2 (2004) onwards, the Chief is now able to hijack vehicles piloted by the Covenant, which are additionally destructible in real-time. Among the drivable vehicles, the "Warthog" has also been partially redesigned to include a fourth seat on the rear bumper, allowing a full four-man fireteam to be active at once while driving both offline and in multiplayer. The enemy variety has also been updated to acknowledge later additions to Halo canon, such as the appearance of the Jiralhanae "Brutes" and the Flood comprising their 'pure' forms first introduced in Halo 3 (2007).

Campaign Evolved adds a further nine weapons beyond the full selection available from the original Combat Evolved, including the Covenant energy sword, Sub-Machine Gun, Battle Rifle, Fuel Rod Cannon, Sentinel Beam, Beam Rifle, Brute Plasma Rifle and Brute Spiker from Halo 2 and Halo 3, as well as the Needle Rifle from Reach. As introduced in Halo 2 and subsequently incorporated into Halo: Combat Evolved Anniversary (2011), the game features collectible Skulls that modify gameplay conditions by either debilitating player proficiencies or initiating absurd effects, such as a weapon randomizer or the classic 'Grunt Birthday Party' Skull which results a spray of celebratory confetti upon landing a headshot on a grunt. Examples of Skulls new to Campaign Evolved include the 'Perspective' modifier, which enables the game to be played in third-person, and 'The Floor is Lava', which forces the player to take damage every time they contact the ground during a mission. 42 total Skulls are available to obtain across the game, with 26 of them returning from prior Halo titles.

In addition to the original game's ten missions, Campaign Evolved includes three new missions set one year before events of the game, during a campaign led by Master Chief and UNSC Sgt. Avery Johnson known as "Operation METEORITE." As the title suggests, Campaign Evolved excludes the competitive multiplayer included with the original Combat Evolved, but still supports cooperative multiplayer throughout the story, with all platforms featuring online play with up to four players, including full cross-platform play and cross-progression, as well as the option for local two-player split-screen gameplay for the console versions. Both controllers must each be signed-in to an account profile to play split-screen co-op.

== Development ==
Halo: Combat Evolved was developed by Bungie as a launch game for Microsoft's Xbox game console in November 2001, establishing the Halo franchise as a tentpole first-party series for the platform. After Bungie gained independence in 2007, Microsoft, which retained the rights to the Halo property, assembled 343 Industries as a first-party studio that would continue the franchise, starting with a Combat Evolved remaster titled Halo: Combat Evolved Anniversary (2011).

In October 2024, 343 Industries announced their formal rebranding as Halo Studios, intentionally done as a way to signal a fundamental change in the development team's internal philosophy, and to provide a clean break between eras of the franchise as previously done with transitioning between Bungie and 343. Halo Studios simultaneously announced that multiple future games were in various stages of production, and that they were all set to be developed on the third-party Unreal Engine 5 as opposed to the proprietary Slipspace Engine used for Halo Infinite. Art director Chris Matthews cited Unreal's respective lighting and rendering technologies, Lumen and Nanite, as presenting opportunities for more interactive objects and player experiences, motivating the engine change. Studio head Pierre Hintze described the rebrand as evocative of their intent to "change the recipe" of how Halo games were produced in conjunction with the pivot to a new engine.

Halo Studios conceived Campaign Evolved as a means of defining a fresh starting point for new players with little knowledge of the Halo storyline and universe, while laying the groundwork for future games in anticipation of both the franchise's 25th anniversary, and the growth in the potential addressable audience from a PlayStation release, a historical first for Halo after being a platform exclusive for Xbox consoles and Windows since inception. Despite the graphics front-end being created in Unreal Engine 5, the team preserved elements of code from the original Blam engine created by Bungie and iterated on by 343 Industries, as a means of retaining Combat Evolved's distinct physics and computer-controlled enemy behavior. Game director Greg Hermann asserted that the move to Unreal also enabled the team to refocus on the implementation of gameplay and content by relying on the technical support of Epic Games, as opposed to simultaneously managing engine and design responsibilities as they did with Infinite.

=== Design ===
Creative director Max Szalgor stated that an aim of Campaign Evolved was to faithfully rebuild every encounter and mission in Combat Evolved with enhancements to fidelity. Fully remaking Combat Evolved also allowed the developers to make larger changes than they could when working on Combat Evolved Anniversary in 2011, such as improved wayfinding and navigation functions during traversal, and improvements to the diversity and pacing in enemy encounters, notably citing the monotony of fighting against the parasitic Flood in the game's seventh mission, "The Library". Community manager Brian Jarrard noted that the franchise being 25 years old meant there was 25 years of player feedback that could be brought to bear on new games, including fan's desire for splitscreen cooperative play. Divisive elements such as sprint were treated as a customizable player choice.

The developers sought to integrate gameplay mechanics and features first introduced in later Halo games into Combat Evolved, including adding weapons that were not usable in the first game, as well as being able to hijack and commandeer vehicles, including the Wraith tank. Skulls, collectible gameplay modifiers first introduced in Halo 2 before being incorporated into Combat Evolved Anniversary, are also available in Campaign Evolved; the game boasts 'dozens' of Skulls to procure, the highest number present in any Halo campaign to date.

As its subtitle suggests, Campaign Evolved eschews including the original game's competitive player versus player (PvP) multiplayer due to the development team's focus on refining the single-player campaign and expanding its respective cooperative multiplayer options. The game still supports four-player online co-op and cross-platform gameplay on all platforms with cross-progression, and retains the two-player local split-screen mode on consoles, which Conn hoped would uphold the sense of community prevalent in Halo gameplay.

=== Presentation ===
While Combat Evolved Anniversary was a simple graphical update of the original game, Campaign Evolved redoes several elements of the game's presentation, chief among them being completely new cinematics and audio that has been re-recorded with new performances from most of the original game's principal voice cast, including Steve Downes, Jen Taylor and Tim Dadabo as John-117 / Master Chief, Cortana and 343 Guilty Spark, respectively. Keston John assumes the role of Sgt. Avery Johnson in Campaign Evolved, succeeding original voice actor David Scully following his retirement in 2013; Keith Silverstein portrays Captain Jacob Keyes in Campaign Evolved, succeeding Pete Stacker, who voiced the character in the original Combat Evolved and Halo: Reach (2010). Game designer Dan Gnaidy stated that the Halo Studios team reviewed the development assets they had access to from Combat Evolved's production to map the blocking and sequencing of scenes, in addition to referencing the original game assets and storyboards produced by Bungie. The game's audio design has been revised, including the original score co-composed by Martin O'Donnell and Michael Salvatori being faithfully remastered.

== Release ==
A remake of Halo: Combat Evolved was first reported to be in development in June 2024 by The Verge, which additionally speculated that the game would target a multiplatform release amidst Microsoft Gaming's newly announced shift to multiplatform games publishing that year. The game was first teased alongside the announcement of the Halo series' pivot to Unreal Engine 5 at the Halo World Championships in October 2024, as part of a demonstration of 'Project Foundry', an in-engine visual exploration piece produced by Halo Studios to experiment with the series' aesthetics in the engine that was noted by commentators for evoking familiar biomes and designs from Combat Evolved. The game was further teased by Microsoft Gaming CEO Phil Spencer during the Xbox Games Showcase in June 2025 as being slated to commemorate the 25th anniversary of Halo and the Xbox brand. Halo: Campaign Evolved was officially announced in October 2025 during that year's Halo World Championships, with a roundtable discussion by Halo Studios developers alongside a thirteen-minute gameplay demo of "The Silent Cartographer", which was also playable to attendees at the event and selected members of the Halo Insider flighting program on Xbox Series X.

Campaign Evolved is the first Halo game to be available on Sony's PlayStation consoles, a decision that Xbox Content and Studios head Matt Booty attributed towards a desire to take games to where players were, regardless of platform. Halo community manager Brian Jarrard commented that the developers viewed Campaign Evolved as the beginning of a new era for the franchise that allowed the community to welcome more players with the shift away from Xbox exclusivity, asserting that future Halo games would also release on PlayStation going forward. Multiple outlets cited these announcements as proof of Microsoft's capitulation to Sony in the console market, signaling the end of the traditional 'console wars' between the two platform holders. The official social media accounts of the White House attempted to play into the commentary by posting an AI-generated photo of President Donald Trump in Master Chief's armor, while the Department of Homeland Security separately posted recruitment ads for Immigration and Customs Enforcement, featuring agents on a Warthog, comparing illegal immigrants to the Flood. Former Halo developers Marcus Lehto and Jaime Griesemer condemned the posts.

In June 2026, The Game Business reported in an attempt to message Xbox's renewed focus on their hardware and exclusive games, Xbox CEO Asha Sharma had pulled the Campaign Evolved story trailer, which featured gameplay footage captured from PlayStation 5 Pro development hardware, from its intended slot in Sony's State of Play presentation on June 2, instead premiering it on June 8, the day after the Xbox Games Showcase. The report was corroborated by Bloomberg News writer Jason Schreier, who also suggested that the decision caused potential friction in Microsoft and Sony's relationship.

Halo: Campaign Evolved was released for PlayStation 5, Windows and Xbox Series X/S on July 28, 2026. It was available from launch on Xbox Game Pass Ultimate and PC Game Pass subscription services. Alongside the standard edition, a Digital Premium Edition enabled an early access period, weapon skins and cosmetics that can be equipped from the game's Customization menu, as well as a digital game manual, an artbook featuring concept illustrations, and the short story Halo: Hungry Buzzards, which elaborates on details from the game's prequel missions. The physical Collector's Edition comes with the game disc in a special steelbook for Xbox Series X or PlayStation 5, or a download voucher for use with the Steam version on Windows; other extras include a replica of Cortana's data chip, three prints of game concept art, a physical game manual modeled after the original Combat Evolved instruction booklet, and a 12-inch statue of Master Chief holding an Assault Rifle designed by Dark Horse Comics. Pre-ordered copies were bundled with a cosmetic pack including low-definition skins inspired by the original Combat Evolved graphics.

== Reception ==
Reception

Aggregate scores
Aggregator	Score
Metacritic	(PC) 77/100 (PS5) 80/100 (XSXS) 81/100
OpenCritic	84% recommend

Review scores
Publication	Score
Destructoid	8.5/10
Eurogamer	4/5
Game Informer	8.5/10
GameSpot	8/10
GamesRadar+	3.5/5
IGN	7/10
PC Gamer (US)	70/100
PCGamesN	7/10
Push Square	9/10
Shacknews	7/10
Video Games Chronicle	5/5

Halo: Campaign Evolved received "generally favorable" reviews, according to review aggregator website Metacritic. Fellow review aggregator OpenCritic assessed that the game received strong approval, being recommended by 84% of critics. Critics generally found that Campaign Evolved was a remake that remained highly faithful to the original. Initially believing remaking Combat Evolved to be pointless, Video Games Chronicle's Andy Robinson wrote that the game respected the source material while elevating it with small tweaks and a large graphical upgrade. Reviewers such as GameSpot's Jordan Ramée suggested Campaign Evolved was now the definitive way to experience the first Halo game, while Eurogamer's Dom Peppiatt considered it an excellent starting point for players unfamiliar to the series. Some critics opined that due to the greater number of features, the version of Combat Evolved included with The Master Chief Collection was a better buy. Other complaints included the lack of multiplayer, which Shacknews's Sam Chandler called a "cardinal sin" given how important it was to the popularity of the original game.

Opinions differed on the changes Campaign Evolved introduced. PC Gamer's Morgan Park appreciated the addition of new weapons, but felt that additions like sprint or excessive objective markers detracted from the gameplay. IGN's Michael Higham felt the new weapons and mechanics added welcome variety, while PCGamesN's Tim Edwards felt that many of the changes felt like welcome extensions to the formula more than unnecessary additions. Eurogamer's Dom Peppiatt wrote that since many of the changes introduced had been made gradually over the Halo games since Combat Evolved released, going back to the original felt frustrating, and Campaign Evolved rectified this. While many reviews noted the total amount of changes were minimal, the larger adjustments to reduce tedium in the back half of the game, and the rework of the Library level, were generally welcomed; Tom Pritchard of Tom's Guide wrote that the changes made the Flood feel like they were more than just another enemy to shoot through, and that their progress in taking over the ring helped make the later levels feel less like retreads.

The visuals were generally praised. Tim Edwards wrote that the game "looks like how you remember Halo—after your mind and nostalgia fill in the blanks." while Game Informer's Matt Miller wrote that the game realized the Pacific Northwest-inspired vision the first game had been unable to fully create. Reviews from IGN and Shacknews, among others, noted that the game had some characteristic weaknesses of Unreal Engine games, such as image fuzziness or excessive shininess and muddy visuals; Park found that the game had a generic photorealism and preferred the more alien look of the original.

The new Operation Meteorite missions were conflictingly received. Destructoid's Scott Duwe and Push Square's Liam Croft called them a welcome addition and among the best missions in the game, with Ramée recommending them as an excellent prequel to the main campaign. In contrast, reviewers like Higham and GamesRadar+'s Will Sawyer called the levels serviceable or unremarkable, and Robinson called them the biggest new offering Campaign Evolved brought to the table while also the weakest. Dom Peppiatt called the Operation Meteorite missions a stark difference in approach between Bungie Studios and Halo Studios, as the prequel missions played more like a film blockbuster, and the character work was sometimes called tropey.
