= Silent Library (disambiguation) =

Silent Library may refer to:

- Silent Library, a segment from the Japanese variety show Downtown no Gaki no Tsukai ya Arahende!!
  - Silent Library, an American television game show that aired on MTV based on the Japanese game show game
- Đại náo thư viện chiến (Vietnamese: Silent Library, lit. 'Library War'), a Vietnamese TV gameshow based on the Japanese game show game; see List of international game shows

== See also ==
- MTV LoudLess, an MTV India game show, a version of the American game show Silent Library, based on the Japanese game show game, produced by Sajeed A.
- Fist of Zen, an MTV UK game show, a version of the American game show Silent Library, based on the Japanese game show game
- Silence (disambiguation)
- Silent (disambiguation)
- Library (disambiguation)
