= Earth City =

Earth City may refer to:

- Earth City, Missouri, an unincorporated community in Missouri, United States
- Earth City demo, a demo for the video game Halo 2
