= Library (disambiguation) =

A library is a collection of books or an institution lending books and providing information.

Library may also refer to:

== Arts and media ==
- Library (journal), a former American literary magazine
- Library (web series), an analog horror web series

=== Music ===
- Library Records, a record label
- "Library", a song by Bridgit Mendler from her 2016 EP Nemesis
- "Library", a song by Macintosh Plus from her 2011 album Floral Shoppe

== Science and technology ==
- Library (biology), a collection of molecules in a stable form that represents some aspect of an organism
- Library (computing), a collection of subprograms used to develop software
- Digital library, an online database of digital objects
- Library (electronics), a collection of cells, macros or functional units that perform common operations
- Library (IBM i), a type of object in the IBM i operating system which is used to group other objects together
- Library (Windows), a virtual folder that aggregates content from various locations in Windows

== Places and transportation ==
- Library, Pennsylvania, United States, an unincorporated community
- Library station (PAAC), a light rail station in South Park, Pennsylvania, United States
- Library (UTA station), a transit station in Salt Lake City, United States
- Library tram stop, Birmingham, England

== See also ==
- Library War (disambiguation)
- The Library (disambiguation)
