= Halo Wars =

2009 real-time strategy video game

- Developer: Ensemble Studios (Note: DLC development by Robot Entertainment. Definitive Edition developed by 343 Industries, and ported to Windows by Behaviour Interactive.)
- Publisher: Microsoft Game Studios
- Writer: Graeme Devine
- Composer: Stephen Rippy
- Series: Halo
- Platforms: Xbox 360; Windows; Xbox One
- Release: February 26, 2009: Xbox 360; AU: February 26, 2009; EU: February 27, 2009; NA: March 3, 2009 Windows, Xbox One; WW: December 20, 2016
- Genre: Real-time strategy
- Modes: Single-player, multiplayer

Halo Wars is a real-time strategy (RTS) video game developed by Ensemble Studios and published by Microsoft Game Studios for the Xbox 360 video game console. It was released in Australia on February 26, 2009; in Europe on February 27; and in North America on March 3. The game is set in the science fiction universe of the Halo series in the year 2531, 21 years before the events of Halo: Combat Evolved. The player leads human soldiers aboard the warship Spirit of Fire in an effort to stop an ancient fleet of ships from falling into the hands of the genocidal alien Covenant.

Halo Wars was unveiled at the X06 Xbox show in 2006. Ensemble designed the game specifically for the Xbox 360 controller, in an attempt to circumvent issues present in previous console RTS titles. Ensemble was closed by Microsoft before the game's release, but soon after Robot Entertainment was founded by many of Ensemble's former employees; this new company continued to support Halo Wars with updates and downloadable content.

Halo Wars received generally positive reviews. Reviewers lauded the game's pre-rendered cinematics, attention to detail in replicating the Halo universe, and intuitive control scheme. Complaints against the game included the lack of an option to play as the Covenant faction in campaign mode as well as the lack of strategic options during play. Critics from GameSpot and USA Today wrote that experienced RTS players would find the strategic elements of the title shallow. The game sold one million units worldwide through March 2009, making it the best-selling console real-time strategy game to date. An enhanced version of the game—Halo Wars: Definitive Edition—developed by 343 Industries, was released for Windows and Xbox One in December 2016. Halo Wars 2, a sequel developed by 343 Industries and Creative Assembly was released in February 2017.

== Gameplay ==
In Halo Wars, special units known as Leaders can turn the tide of battle. Here, the Prophet of Regret, a Covenant Leader, calls down a "Cleansing" ability from an orbiting ship to destroy enemy human forces.

Halo Wars is a real-time strategy (RTS) video game developed exclusively for the Xbox 360 console, in which players command armies from a bird's-eye view of the battlefield. The game focuses on military combat, but contains streamlined resource management and base construction elements. It was designed with the Xbox 360 controller in mind; for example, the A button is used for selecting units. A single tap of the button selects one unit, while a double tap selects all units of the same type. The d-pad navigates to current battles and cycles through bases, while the right analog stick adjusts the camera angle. A radial menu is used for base construction.

Halo Wars features a story-based, military campaign game mode that can be played alone or cooperatively over the Xbox Live service. A plotless multiplayer option, called "skirmish mode", lets players compete against human or computer-controlled opponents. The game features two factions the players can control: the human United Nations Space Command (UNSC) as Captain Cutter, Sergeant Forge, or Professor Anders, and the alien Covenant as the Prophet of Regret, the Arbiter, or an unnamed Brute Chieftain. Each faction has different units, strengths, and special abilities. There are three selectable "Leaders" for each side; the chosen leader allows the use of specific units and upgrades during play. While Covenant Leaders appear on the battlefield as units, human leaders do not.

Combat in Halo Wars is balanced by a "rock-paper-scissors" system. In general, ground vehicles are effective in combat against infantry, infantry are effective against aircraft, and aircraft are effective against vehicles. Most units have a unique special ability; for example, human Marines throw grenades, while the "Warthog" vehicle can run over enemies. Humans have access to their ship, the Spirit of Fire, and its special abilities, such as a powerful coilgun called a M.A.C. (Magnetic Accelerator Cannon). Covenant units are generally weaker than their UNSC counterparts, but can use inexpensive and powerful defensive shield generators to add protection to their bases. Players establish their armies by building and expanding bases; these are used to train units and to allocate resources to the research of upgrades and technologies. There are a limited number of potential locations for bases on each scenario or map, making base fortification and defense a priority. A player is defeated if all of their bases are destroyed and either their army gets destroyed as well or 60 seconds passes without them building a new base.

Units are trained, buildings upgraded, and special abilities activated using resources known as "supplies". Players can find supplies on the battlefield, or generate them by building supply structures at bases. Greater numbers of these buildings produce more supplies. Some structures and upgrades become available only after the player achieves a certain "tech level". The UNSC can achieve multiple tech levels through the construction of reactors, with some actions requiring up to level four; the Covenant builds a single temple that allows three upgrades of tech level. The Covenant has one fewer tech level, and each upgrade is more expensive. Destruction of a temple results in the loss of all tech until the temple is rebuilt. Each base has a limited amount of space, so players must balance their resource buildings with other facilities, such as those used to create military units. The number of units a player can deploy is restricted, though certain upgrades ease this limit.

== Synopsis ==
=== Setting and characters ===
Halo Wars takes place in the science fictional universe of the Halo series, during the 26th century. In 2525, a collective of alien races known as the Covenant attacked humanity, declaring humans an affront to their gods, the Forerunners. The game takes place in 2531, roughly 20 years before the events of Halo: Combat Evolved. Years after the Covenant invaded the colony of Harvest, human UNSC forces are still locked in battle on the planet.

The commander of the UNSC warship Spirit of Fire is Captain James Cutter (Gregg Berger), a strong leader who has earned the admiration of his subordinates. Cutter's lack of political ambition prevents him from climbing the ranks further. Serving under Cutter is Sergeant John Forge (Nolan North), a gruff Marine whose devotion to his men has caused him to be jailed twice for disobeying orders and engaging in disorderly conduct. Joining the Spirit of Fire's military expedition is Professor Ellen Anders (Kim Mai Guest), a scientist interested in ancient ruins of the mysterious Forerunners. The Spirit of Fire is operated with help from Serina (Courtenay Taylor), a super-intelligent artificial intelligence (AI) with a sardonic sense of humor. Leading the Covenant search for Forerunner technology is a holy warrior known as the Arbiter (David Sobolov), who the Covenant leaders, the Prophet Hierarchs, have tasked with the oversight of humanity's destruction.

=== Plot ===
The Spirit of Fire is sent to the ruined planet Harvest to investigate Covenant activity, where Cutter learns that the Covenant has excavated something at the planet's northern pole. When the UNSC's main outpost on Harvest is captured, Cutter orders Forge to retake it. Soon after, Forge scouts the Covenant excavation and discovers that they, under the direction of the Arbiter, have discovered a Forerunner facility. Forge's troops defeat the Covenant forces before they can destroy the installation, and Anders arrives. She determines that the facility is an interstellar map, and recognizes a set of coordinates that points to the human colony of Arcadia.

After escaping the facility, the Spirit of Fire travels to Arcadia, where the Covenant has begun raiding local cities and slaughtering civilians. Forge contacts the local Spartan special forces and helps with the evacuation process. UNSC forces discovered that the Covenant has built a giant energy shield to hide the construction of a gigantic Scarab super-weapon, and their search of Forerunner ruins in the area. The UNSC forces use experimental equipment to break through and destroy the Scarab. The Arbiter kidnaps Anders during a salvage operation and escapes the planet, with Spirit of Fire in pursuit.

Spirit of Fire follows Anders' signal to an uncharted planet in another star system. The planet's surface is infested by the parasitic Flood, who attack and assimilate any sentient life they encounter. The Spirit of Fire inadvertently activates a Forerunner docking station and enters the planet's interior, revealing the planet is actually a Forerunner installation with a hollow, habitable interior, and a miniature sun at its core. The Covenant's plan is to activate a dormant fleet of highly advanced Forerunner starships inside the installation, and use them to obliterate humanity.

While the Forerunner ships are being activated, Anders escapes through a teleportation device and is rescued. Cutter decides to destroy the Forerunner fleet rather than allow the Covenant to use it. Anders formulates a plan to detonate the ship's faster-than-light drive in the planet's sun, as the explosion would cause a supernova. Before they can prepare the reactor, Forge and the Spartans are ambushed by the Arbiter and his Elites. The Spartans dispatch the aliens and Forge kills the Arbiter. The reactor is damaged during the fight, necessitating a manual detonation. Forge volunteers for the suicidal task, telling the Spartans that they will be needed in the coming fight. The Spirit of Fire escapes just as Forge overloads the reactor, destroying the fleet and the Forerunner world. Without its faster-than-light drive, the Spirit of Fire is left drifting in space. The crew enters cryonic sleep for long-term storage as Cutter takes a last look at Forge's empty cryonic tube. If the game is completed on the "Legendary" difficulty mode, Serina wakes Cutter and tells him that "something has happened".

== Development ==
=== Design ===
Computer game developer Bungie conceived Halo: Combat Evolved as a real-time strategy game in which players would tactically control units and vehicles in a three-dimensional environment. Microsoft acquired Bungie in 2000, and the game became a first-person shooter and "killer app" for the Xbox console. Bungie produced two best-selling sequels, Halo 2 in 2004 and Halo 3 in 2007, before separating from Microsoft and becoming an independent company once more. Although Bungie is free to produce new intellectual property, the rights to Halo remain with Microsoft. Shane Kim, the head of Microsoft Game Studios, said during the split announcement that "our intent is to continue investing in [Halo] and growing it."

In 2004, the Microsoft-owned Ensemble Studios—developers of the Age of Empires strategy series—began work on the game that would become Halo Wars. The studio confirmed in April 2006 that it was working on a console-based RTS. CEO Tony Goodman said, "We're giving RTS games on the console a shot. We actually spent a whole year just trying to reconstruct how the controls would work on an RTS game." Without revealing the title, Goodman described the game as being shorter and more visceral than their previous projects.

Halo Wars was originally not a Halo series title. Ensemble spent 12 to 18 months working on the control scheme, using the Age of Mythology engine. The development team hacked an Age of Mythology expansion, The Titans, and used it as a prototype for control experiments. Ensemble found that managing Age of Mythology's resources, units, and buildings was too difficult with the console's controller. "The answer [to making a PC-style strategy game for a console] is actually hidden in the question," Jason Pace, Microsoft Game Studio's lead producer, told The New Zealand Herald. "It's something we believe has held strategy games back from succeeding on the console: you can't effectively bring a PC-style strategy game to the console because the fundamental game mechanic is tied to the mouse and keyboard input devices. It's not a question of just changing the control scheme to be gamepad friendly—you need to adapt the underlying strategy mechanic to make sense with the new input device." Senior designer Justin Rouse said that the team kept the controls from the research they had conducted, but scrapped the rest in favor of "build[ing] from the floor up what we need[ed]: the basics, the core of a strategy game." With the goal of making "the first great strategy game on the console", Ensemble streamlined gameplay mechanics; the game's single resource is produced at each base site, which allows players to quickly cycle through their bases instead of micromanaging multiple resources at many locations.

Once the developers were satisfied with the controls, they presented their project to Microsoft, who suggested that it be turned into a Halo game. Bungie was reportedly not happy about this development. Ensemble's Founder, Tony Goodman, stated in a 2012 interview that Bungie saw the move as "the whoring out of our franchise"

Although Ensemble had to re-create all of Bungie's assets from scratch, Bungie had produced a large amount of reference material for the Halo film adaptation that the Halo Wars team used for inspiration. Another reference point was art from the Halo first-person shooters; however, as the art was from a forward perspective and Halo Wars takes place from a bird's-eye view, the team exaggerated shapes to make the units recognizable. Lead designer Graeme Devine noted that the Warthog Jeep is "actually jumping three times as high as it does in Halo, and it goes four times faster than it does in Halo, and all these things—but it looks the same. Very different, between look and accuracy." To ensure artistic continuity between Halo Wars and previous games in the series, Ensemble created a set of guidelines for their artists to follow; for example, the Covenant were to retain their curvy, organic look, while the Forerunner and UNSC were to keep the same geometry angles. UNSC structures and units were given a green tint, with gold specular highlights. The Covenant were textured with a repeating honeycomb pattern, with small blue lights against a purple base color.

Devine described the challenge of developing Halo Wars as "getting Halo fans to play a realtime strategy game, and getting realtime strategy fans to play a Halo game." "Fans of the [first-person shooter] series have very strong expectations for how a Halo games looks, feels and plays. Halo is all about heroic action to save humanity, mega-battles across the galaxy, visceral, highly-tuned combat and heart-pounding tension," Pace said. These themes were considered fundamental to the Halo experience, and so Ensemble tried to replicate them for Halo Wars. Early in play tests, the developers watched devoted Halo fans play the game; their feedback led to the development of special abilities, which, according to Devine, enhanced the Halo feel. Ensemble initially considered making the Flood a playable race, but this idea did not progress beyond the concept stage. According to Devine, this was largely because the Flood would have needed to be similar to StarCraft's Zerg, in order to maintain balance with the UNSC and Covenant. This did not match the Flood's role as "the single scariest thing in the galaxy".

Because of the Master Chief's large role in previous games, significant effort was expended on the Spartan units. Lead designer Dave Pottinger said the design team "started out just accepting and embracing the fact that the Spartans have to be the coolest unit in the game. If they're not, it's not going to meet the Halo fans' expectations." To position the Spartans as "kingmakers" in gameplay, the team gave them what it considered to be the "coolest" unit ability: hijacking enemy vehicles. The developers hoped players would become attached to individual Spartans in the campaign and gave each one an individual name; skirmish units were left nameless. The character design of the Spartans was meant to emphasize their relative inexperience and the setting of the game, which takes place decades before the events of the main trilogy. Devine commented on the Spartans' look:

... We felt because it was 20 years earlier, these are much younger Spartans. They aren't quite as experienced as Master Chief, and we looked a lot at combat infantry going into actual wars, and typically at the beginning of a war, especially the Vietnam War, if you look at the infantry, they're all loaded up. They have all the backpacks on, they have all the belts on, every single bit of armor is there, and they're carrying around lots of armor. At the end of the war, they've lost it all and just carry what they need. This is all they have. So if you look at our Spartans, they have more pieces of armor on going into the war. They have more markings on there, more pieces of armor. They've still got the belts on, they're still carrying around everything.

Ensemble expanded the Halo universe during the game's development, in order to create enough units to give players strategic options. Among the new units was the Gorgon, a biped mech that used weapons called Needlers to destroy light aircraft. However, Ensemble later realized that the Gorgon invalidated a rule they had established: "anything with two legs that walks" was an infantry unit. Instead, the team added a new aircraft called the Vampire. The UNSC, meanwhile, lacked a melee unit to match the Covenant's hand-to-hand power. Ensemble considered using the original, less advanced Spartan Mark I suits of armor, in keeping with Halo lore, but once added these units were indistinguishable from Spartans in appearance. Instead, they created a lumbering, mechanized unit called the Cyclops, a nod to Age of Mythology.

Time constraints prevented many elements from appearing in the final game. One such missing feature was a fatality system by which Spartans or Covenant leaders could inflict massive damage on large groups of units. Pottinger said that the animations, while interesting, did not mesh with the fast-paced combat of Halo Wars and raised balance concerns. Other elements based on Halo fiction did not work in a strategy game. Although more than 100 people worked on the project, which cost tens of millions of dollars, a Covenant campaign was never realized because of a lack of manpower and money.

=== Announcements ===
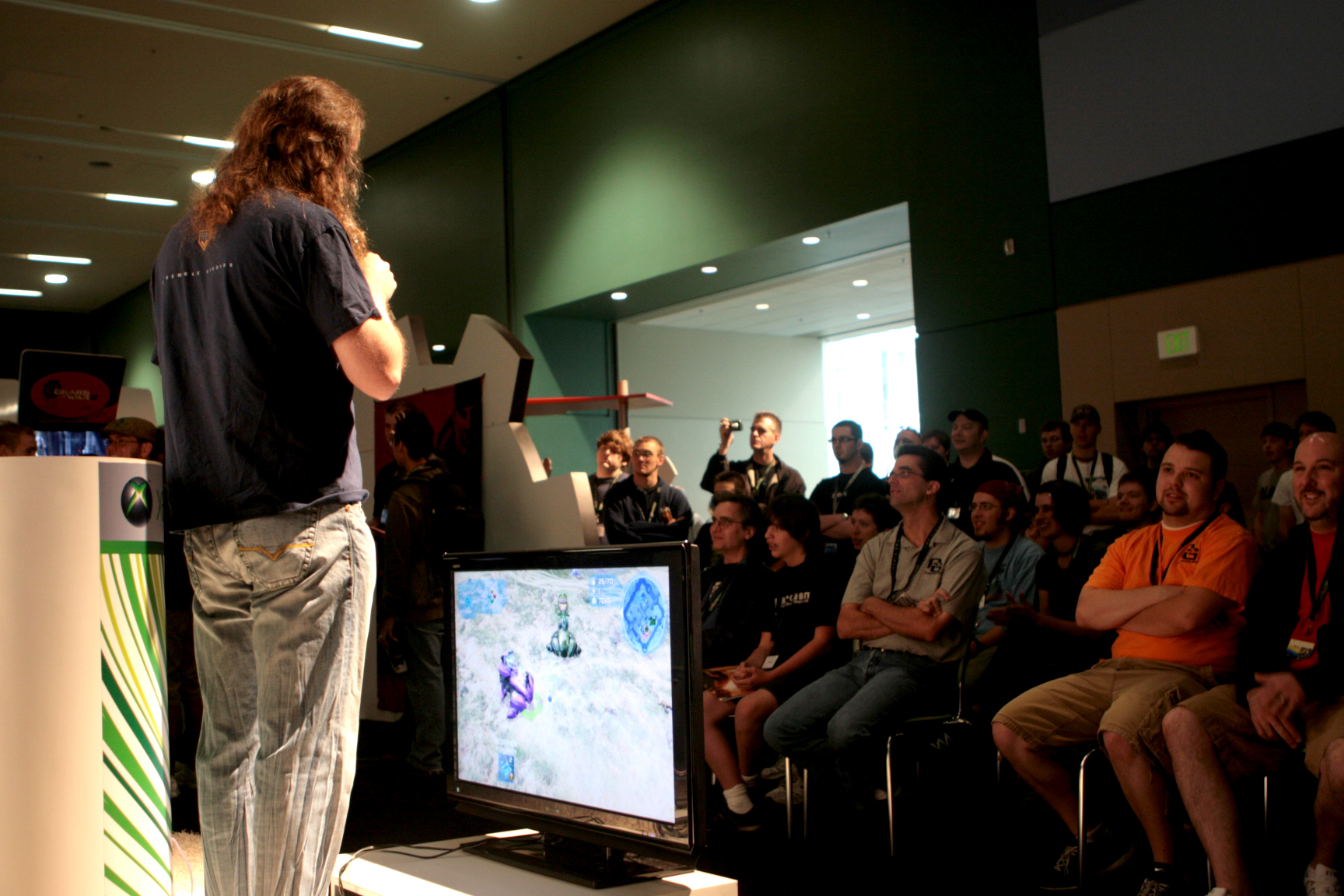
Devine demonstrates Halo Wars at the 2008 Penny Arcade Expo.

Halo Wars was officially announced at Microsoft's X06 media briefing on September 27, 2006, with a pre-rendered trailer created by Blur Studio. The trailer depicts a group of Warthog vehicles searching for missing soldiers. Covenant Elites ambush the patrol and a battle ensues involving human and Covenant vehicles and infantry. The trailer ends with the arrival of Spartan reinforcements. GameSpy listed the trailer in its top 25 video game cinematic moments, because it showed "the world of Halo on a much grander scale".

Halo Wars was exhibited at the Electronic Entertainment Expo (E3) in 2007 and 2008. Devine narrated the soundtrack for a video shown at E3 2007, which was later made available on the Xbox Live Marketplace. This video described the game's controls, user interface, vehicles, special weapons, and new units. It also showed a UNSC base consisting of an airbase, vehicle depot, missile silo, and other buildings. IGN, Next Generation, and PC World ranked Halo Wars as one of the most anticipated showings at E3.

On September 10, 2008, Ensemble Studios announced that it would close after Halo Wars' completion. Ensemble founder Tony Goodman and other employees announced the formation of a new studio, Robot Entertainment, shortly before the game's release; another group of ex-staff created Bonfire Studios. Robot announced that, while developing new intellectual property, it would support Halo Wars and Age of Empires through a partnership with Microsoft Game Studios.

=== Audio ===
Halo Wars Original Soundtrack
Title	Time
"Spirit of Fire"	2:11
"Bad Here Day"	3:00
"Perspective"	1:24
"Money or Meteors"	3:23
"Flollo"	3:01
"Just Ad Nauseum"	0:56
"Unusually Quiet"	1:29
"Flip and Sizzle"	3:39
"Put the Lady Down"	2:20
"Six-Armed Robbing Suit"	2:55
"Action Figure Hands"	2:59
"Status Quo Show"	1:13
"Part of the Plan"	0:29
"Work Burns and Runaway Grunts"	3:06
"Freaked Out"	0:44
"Rescued or Not"	1:31
"Best Guess at Best"	2:55
"One Problem at a Time"	1:14
"De Facto the Matter"	1:31
"Part of the Problem"	2:58
"Fingerprints Are Broken"	3:22
"Out of There Alive"	1:04
"Through Your Hoops"	1:35
"Under Your Hurdles"	1:28
"Insignificantia (All Sloppy/No Joe)"	3:19
Total time	53:57

Halo Wars' music was composed by Stephen Rippy, the composer for all of the Age of Empires games. Rippy wanted to write new material while maintaining continuity by reusing iconic elements of the Halo trilogy's music, written by Martin O'Donnell and partner Michael Salvatori. Consultation with O'Donnell and Salvatori finished before Rippy became involved in the project, but the composer sent a compact disc of his work to O'Donnell halfway through the writing process. Before starting work on Halo Wars, Rippy listened to previous Halo soundtracks and searched for useful material in discarded Ensemble projects; "I'm a big fan of both cataloging that stuff and stealing from it without remorse," Rippy said. "Sometimes you don't know what you've got until you really, really need it." Rippy and audio lead Kevin McMullan examined O'Donnell's tracks to identify elements to reuse in Halo Wars. Foregoing his usual method of writing melodies before determining the method of sound production, Rippy built melodies around synthesizer patches or drum loops. He felt that scoring for science fiction was a change of pace from his previous work, which was written for historical settings.

Rippy began writing music for the game in April 2007. "Some of the plot points of Halo Wars revolve around discovery, and I think that was my favorite idea to write to—that sense of, 'no one's seen this before,'" he said. The first two tracks combined repurposed elements from past projects with his efforts to convey the Halo sound. "Flollo" contained musical ideas Rippy had experimented with since his last project, Age of Empires III: The WarChiefs. "Bad Here Day" was the first piece in which he tried to incorporate the "Halo sound". Rippy felt it important to avoid repeating too many old themes because he wanted the game to have its own identity; however, he wanted to continue to incorporate choir and piano, elements he believed to be integral to the sound of previous Halo games. In adherence to an Ensemble Studios tradition, the tracks are often named after coined phrases and inside jokes, rather than in-game events.

By the end of 2007, Rippy had completed all of the gameplay music, including end credits, battle themes, and ambient world tracks. In the game's skirmish mode, the music reflects the environment rather than the warring factions. To ensure that the character of the music changed depending on the environment, he followed self-imposed rules; one environment could feature guitars, but not piano, for instance. To musically unify each world, he added a short introductory piece containing common elements. In contrast with the skirmish mode, the campaign mode contains different recurring melodies for each major character and the human ship Spirit of Fire. Rippy's most intensive work period was January 2008, when he began writing music for the game's cinematics; by this point, he had been working on the score for nine months. Rippy finished the score by February 2008, and, after three months, all tracks were ready to be recorded.

Although the previous live orchestrations for Halo games were performed by the Northwest Sinfonia in Seattle, Washington, Rippy chose the FILMharmonic Orchestra of Prague to record Halo Wars' music. Rippy had been in Prague attending recording sessions for Age of Empires III: The Asian Dynasties and loved both the city and the sound the orchestra produced. The lower cost of recording in Eastern Europe was an additional benefit. The March 10–15 recording sessions involved 24 vocalists and 45 instrumentalists; choir and string sections were later overdubbed to enlarge the sound. In all, roughly 65 minutes of Halo Wars' 75-minute score were recorded in Prague. The final touches and production took place in Seattle; O'Donnell attended one of the mixing sessions.

Rippy used the Audiokinetic Wwise pipeline to create dynamic music that changes with the action in the game. Although Rippy used Wwise's tools only for dynamic music, they made audio system setup much easier than in previous Ensemble games. For each battle sequence, the musical cue was divided into sections and mixed differently for each section. "When a cue is triggered, an intro plays and then the game randomly picks between all of those elements for as long as the battle continues," Rippy explained. "Once it's over, an outro plays and then it's back to the regular "world" music. It was an interesting way to work, and I'd like to push it further if there's an opportunity in the future."

Four tracks from Halo Wars were included as a preview on a bonus DVD bundled with Halo Trilogy—The Complete Original Soundtracks, a December 2008 compilation of previous Halo music. The tracks were mixed in Dolby Digital 5.1-channel Surround Sound and packaged with video of recording sessions and the "Five Long Years" trailer. The soundtrack was released on February 17 as a standalone compact disc and as a digital download. AOL Radio secured the exclusive rights to premiere the soundtrack early, playing a new track at the beginning of every hour.

== Release ==
The pre-release playable demo for Halo Wars was first mentioned in the October 2007 issue of Official Xbox Magazine, and it became available for download on February 5, 2009; redemption codes for early access were given starting January 29. According to Microsoft, the game demo was downloaded by more than 2 million Xbox Live Gold members in the first five days, and set a record for most demo downloads on the service.

In addition to the standard retail version, a Limited Collector's Edition of Halo Wars was made available. To attract Halo 3's player base, Microsoft bundled early access to the Mythic Map Pack, a collection of three Halo 3 multiplayer maps, with the collector's edition. A 48-page, half-size hardcover graphic novel was also included; titled Halo Wars: Genesis, it was created by Phil Noto, Graeme Devine, and Eric Nylund. It explores the background stories of Anders, the Arbiter, Forge and Cutter. Other bonuses included a unique in-game vehicle, trading cards, and a Spirit of Fire patch. Players who pre-ordered the game from certain retailers received a special in-game Warthog vehicle with flame decals. GameStop announced that on February 28, 2009, one thousand stores in the United States would hold Halo Wars tournaments, and two thousand GameStop stores held midnight releases for the game. European markets sold a "Best of Halo" bundle of Halo Wars, Halo 3 and an Xbox 360.

On release, Halo Wars reached second place on the United Kingdom weekly sales charts behind Killzone 2. Halo Wars reached only 16.7% of Halo 3's first-week sales, but it outsold Command & Conquer 3: Tiberium Wars threefold, making it the fastest-selling console strategy game. The following week, Halo Wars's sales were ranked fifth. In Australia, Halo Wars' weekly sales ranked highest, ahead of Killzone 2. By March 12, the limited edition and standard version were ranked second and third, respectively, on the United States Xbox 360 sales charts, behind Call of Duty: World at War. Gamasutra attributed the surge in Halo 3 sales to the release of Halo Wars; the former was fourth in the United States and second in Australia in sales of Xbox 360 games, and reappeared on the list of top 20 United States console games for February.

Before the game's release, industry analyst Michael Pachter estimated that Halo Wars would sell 2 million units. On March 19, 2009, Microsoft announced that the game had sold 1 million units and that players had spent 118 total years of time in online skirmish matches. According to NPD Group's March sales figures, Halo Wars sold 639,000 copies in the U.S. through March, making it the third best-selling game in the market.

In June 2016, Microsoft announced Halo Wars: Definitive Edition—an enhanced version of the game—for Windows and Xbox One. Development of the Definitive Edition was handled by 343 Industries, with Behaviour Interactive handling the development for the Windows port. It was made available on December 20, 2016 as part of the Ultimate Edition version of Halo Wars 2.

== Downloadable content ==
After Ensemble's closing, Robot Entertainment announced that it was developing downloadable content (DLC) for Halo Wars. Pottinger described support as ongoing rather than a one-time effort and compared it to Bungie's post-launch additions to Halo 3. He stated that Robot would also work on balance issues, bug fixes, and other patches.

The first DLC package, Strategic Options, added three new multiplayer modes. "Keepaway" is similar to capture the flag; in it, players try to capture and hold Forerunner units. In "Tug-of-war", players earn points by fielding large armies and destroying enemy units. In "Reinforcement", players receive units as reinforcements, rather than training them at bases. The amount of available resources and reactors determines which types of units are deployed and the upgrades they can earn. Strategic Options was released on May 19, 2009, after a patch that addressed software bugs and game balance issues. The update garnered criticism for its small size (2 megabytes) and high price (800 Microsoft Points). Pottinger responded on the Halo Wars forums that the game modes were small downloads "because they are rules. There is some new content, but it's obviously a different type of content compared to a map." Robot released a second DLC package on July 21, 2009. The DLC, dubbed "Historic Battles", contains four additional maps and four new Xbox Live achievements.

== Reception ==
Reception

Aggregate score
Aggregator	Score
Metacritic	X360: 82/100; XONE: 81/100

Review scores
Publication	Score
1Up.com	B
Computer and Video Games	7.9/10
Eurogamer	8.0/10
Game Informer	9.0/10
GameSpot	6.5/10
GameSpy	4.5/5
IGN	8.4/10 (US); 9.0/10 (AU); 8.2/10 (UK)
Official Xbox Magazine (US)	9.0/10 (UK)
X-Play	4/5

Halo Wars garnered generally positive reviews. The game has an average of 82/100 on aggregate web site Metacritic. Critics were split on whether Halo Wars was a successful console translation of the RTS genre. GameSpy's Allen Rausch argued that, as Halo: Combat Evolved showed that first-person shooters could work on consoles, Halo Wars "is an RTS ... on a console ... and it works". Tom Price of TeamXbox said that gamers have been waiting a long time for a console RTS "to get it right", and Halo Wars did so; reviewers for Official Xbox Magazine credited Ensemble with creating a strategy game that felt "absolutely at home on the console", rather than a "poorly shoehorned ... port" of a PC game with clumsy controls. 1UP's Thierry Nguyen was neutral about whether it was a good RTS game or Halo title, but called it a "solid beginning towards what could be a really good console RTS". Digital Trends' Scott Steinberg said that, while not perfect, Halo Wars made a strong case for the viability of RTS on consoles; "There's certainly the potential to have PC holdouts seriously reconsidering hoisting the controller." Peter Hartlaub of the San Francisco Chronicle offered a dismissive summation of the game as "a remedial game—real-time strategy for dummies", and stated that the game offered relatively little innovation when compared to other Halo titles.

Reviewers generally praised Halo Wars's controls. Critics who were less experienced RTS players, such as Darren Zenko of the Toronto Star, appreciated the streamlined RTS experience. In contrast, critics such as Luke Anderson of GameSpot said that the game lacked the depth necessary to attract more seasoned RTS players. Some critics were frustrated by the lack of control features—specifically, the ability to create and manage groups of units, the lack of hotkeys, the inability to set rally points for different units, and the need to return to the base to adjust production. Nguyen wrote that "finesse maneuvers ... are more difficult to pull off than they should be". Brett Molina of USA Today said that experts would find the action oversimplified, but that the game "is an excellent choice for fans of the Halo universe and players new to real-time strategy". Reviewers for GameSpy, G4TV, and Eurogamer stated that the controls worked well mainly because the developers omitted features to make most options quickly available; for example, limiting base construction to select areas made sure players could easily find their buildings.

Reviewers considered the factions balanced. Eurogamer's Kieron Gillen commented that the Covenant was harder to master, especially because the campaign served as a tutorial for the UNSC, but no similar introduction was available for the Covenant. However, he said the two sides were "authentically different", and each offered its own challenges to players. Some critics, such as Nick Cowen of The Daily Telegraph, wished that the Flood was a playable faction; in contrast, Ryan Geddes of IGN disliked the Flood and appreciated their exclusion. Will Porter of IGN UK enjoyed the rock-paper-scissors RTS mechanics, but said that "since the game is singularly crap at indicating which units are rocks and which scissors," players had to learn which units were best via trial and error, an issue that was more prevalent with the Covenant.

The game's plot was well received. Reviewers praised the game's cinematics and voice acting. Geddes said the story was good, but not on par with those of Bungie's Halo games, and that most of the characters were stereotypical and somewhat unlikable. Critics noted that for a strategy game, the campaign was rather short, with only 15 missions; Nate Ralph of Wired completed each in fewer than 40 minutes. Jon Wilcox of Total Video Games wrote "there's an ebb and flow" to the gameplay, with "lengthy chapters cut with shorter punchy ones or time-based missions, all together creating a surprisingly compelling experience". Wilcox said the additions of performance-based medals added replay value to the campaign. Price said that, although the story and mission structure of the game was fairly standard, levels that were "rote" in other RTS games seemed more substantial in Halo Wars. Reviewers such as Geddes, Wilcox, and Patrick Kolan of IGN UK said that the lack of a Covenant campaign was an unfortunate omission.

Publications judged the multiplayer aspect of the game well. Wilcox noted that, although the multiplayer mode "added [nothing] new [to RTS games], at the very least it's a solid experience that expands the longevity of Halo Wars." Adam Biessener of Game Informer wrote that Halo Wars gameplay was better against human players, as campaign "gimmicks" and poor artificial intelligence were not an issue. The Mirror's Kevin Lynch found fault with the "limited" variety of game modes.

Critics generally agreed that Ensemble re-created the Halo universe's aesthetic well. Gillen said knowledge of the game universe could alleviate some issues of player ignorance regarding units' actions: "It's not just the geek thrill of seeing a Scarab in action—it's that you understand what the Scarab means on the battlefield (trouble)," he wrote. "We know which characters are best against tanks, and which are probably best in special vehicles." Nguyen said that, although the core units meshed well, the inclusion of Ensemble-developed units gave Halo Wars the feeling of a generic science-fiction title. While giving the game a mixed review, Anderson said that the authentic-looking units and environments went a long way to integrating the game with the rest of the series. Wilcox commented that with the Halo-inspired menu system and Rippy's score, "before the campaign even begins, the message is clear: this is still very much a Halo game." Overall, Halo Wars was judged a fitting final game for Ensemble.

During the 13th Annual Interactive Achievement Awards, the Academy of Interactive Arts & Sciences nominated Halo Wars for "Strategy/Simulation Game of the Year".

== Sequel ==
On August 4, 2015, Microsoft announced Halo Wars 2, developed by Creative Assembly with assistance from 343 Industries. The game was released February 21, 2017 for the Xbox One and Windows 10.
