= The Library =

The Library may refer to:

- Bibliotheca historica, also known as The Library, a work by Diodorus Siculus
- The Library (journal), a publication of the Bibliographical Society
- The Library (film), a 2013 Thai short film
- The Library (play), a 2014 play by Scott Z. Burns
- "The Library" (Seinfeld), an episode of the television series Seinfeld
- "The Library" (Avatar: The Last Airbender), an episode of the television series Avatar: The Last Airbender
- The Library, a World Fantasy Award-winning 2002 novella by Zoran Živković
- The Library (Halo), a level in the video game Halo: Combat Evolved

== See also ==
- Library
- Bibliotheca (Pseudo-Apollodorus), a collection of Greek mythology and legends
