= The Silent Cartographer =

Level in the video game Halo: Combat Evolved

- Halo location
- The Silent Cartographer in its remastered Halo: Combat Evolved Anniversary incarnation
- First appearance: Halo: Combat Evolved (2001)
- Last appearance: Halo: Campaign Evolved (2026)
- Created by: Bungie
- Genre: First-person shooter

In-universe information
- Location: Installation 04
- Characters: Master Chief; Cortana; Foehammer

"The Silent Cartographer" is the fourth level in the first-person shooter (FPS) video game Halo: Combat Evolved. Taking place on the Halo ringworld, it follows the Master Chief and a group of UNSC Marines as they wage a daytime beachfront assault on the Covenant in search of an ancient Forerunner installation known as the "Silent Cartographer".

The level has received critical praise for its visuals and level design, as well as its use of vehicles to enhance gameplay. Called one of the most iconic levels in the Halo series, and one of the best FPS levels of all time, it is credited as helping to shift the genre from linear, corridor-heavy level designs to open spaces emphasizing player freedom. It was also an important aspect of Halo's development, crystallizing the decisions of the development team on the game's genre and visual design language.

== Level content ==
The player, in the role of Master Chief, starts out flying towards an island on a Pelican dropship piloted by "Foehammer". After Master Chief and his fellow Marines touch down on the beach, combat immediately begins against the enemy Covenant. The enemies are too far away to hit effectively, forcing the player to advance quickly into the fray of battle. After Covenant forces are cleared from the beach, Foehammer drops a Warthog jeep for the player to ride. The player is encouraged to move quickly down the beach with the Warthog before defeating Covenant reinforcements sent to retake the beach.

With the entrance to the Cartographer sealed off by the Covenant, the player is forced to defeat their "Hunter" units to reach an unlocking mechanism. Following the player's unlocking of the door, they are also forced to contend with Covenant Elites equipped with active camouflage. Following this, the player can retrieve a rocket launcher from a downed Pelican. Getting in a new Warthog, the player unlocks the previously sealed door and enters an interior area with more vertical combat. There, the player must fight their way to the Cartographer and past a powerful sword-wielding Elite and their other squad members. When this is complete, they are evacuated via Pelican.

== Development ==
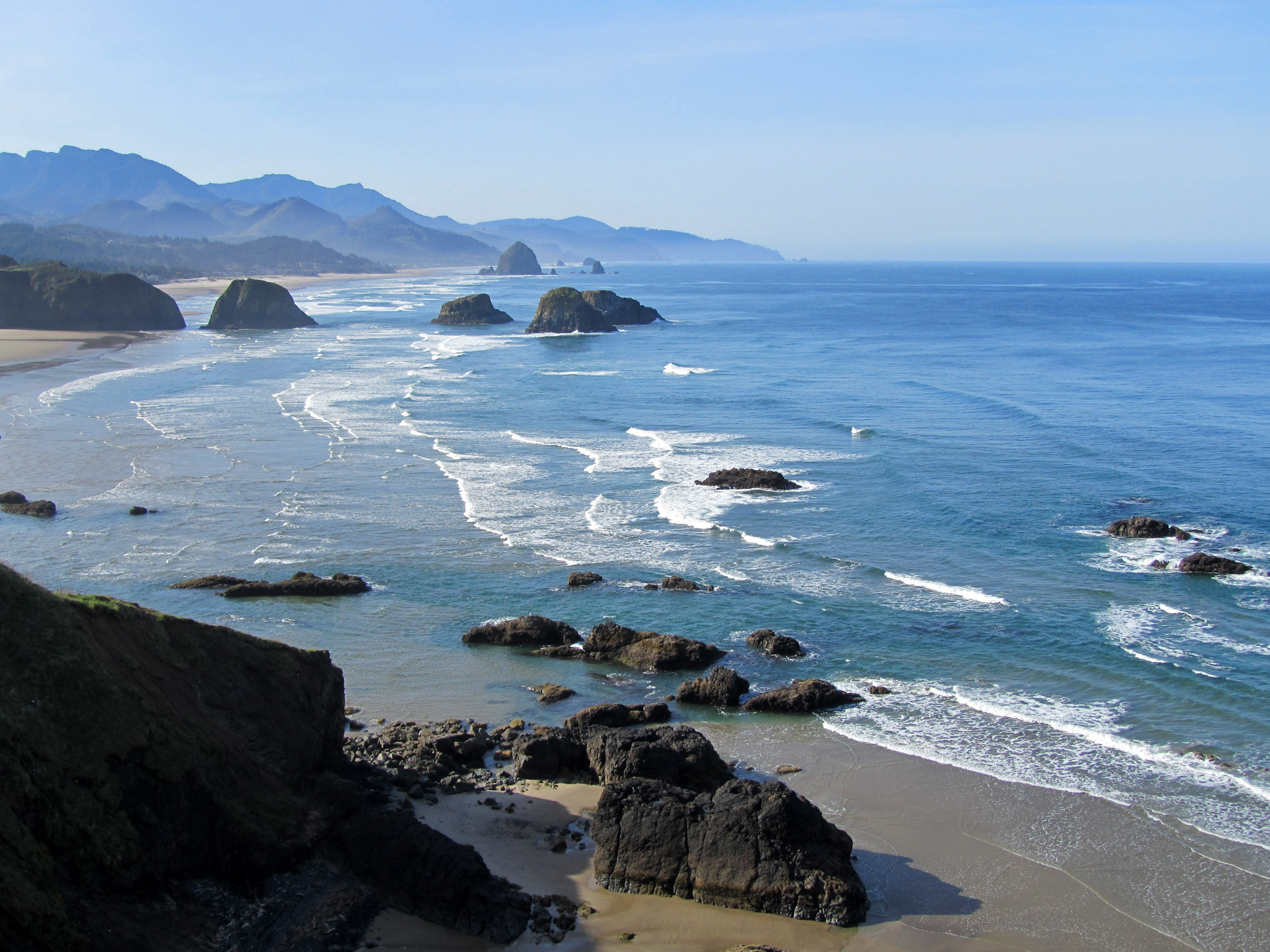
The level design was inspired by the environment of the Pacific Northwest.

According to Marcus Lehto, the art director of Halo: Combat Evolved, The Silent Cartographer's design was first inspired by the "amazing beauty" of the Pacific Northwest, when Bungie and its developers moved to Seattle after Microsoft acquired the studio in June 2000. The level was created while Halo was still being planned as a real-time strategy game, and was designed with wide-open spaces that were conducive to such gameplay. However, the fact that the Warthog was so "fun" to drive led the team to change the game's genre, making it an action game. The multiple paths and wide-open areas featured in the level's design forced the team to design missions that did not have to be done in a linear order.

According to The Art of Halo, The Silent Cartographer was used to test aspects of the game while they were in development, such as lighting, visibility, objects and effects. The level was also used for early demonstrations of the game. Lehto stated that "the Forerunner visual language didn't really come together for me until I worked on the level that became 'The Silent Cartographer' in Halo — the 'beach landing' level".

== Reception ==
G. B. Burford of Kotaku called the level "superb", with a "constant sense that you're making progress as you play through the level". He stated that while the level's generous use of checkpoints gave the impression of the player being on the attack, they are also vulnerable due to being alone for a large part of the level. Alex Dale of GamesRadar+ called the level one that bucked the trend of "tight, claustrophobic corridors" and "blew the walls wide open", "offering the kind of freeform, tactical warfare that fans could only have dreamed about at the time". David Houghton of the same website called the level's design "bogglingly non-linear brilliance", saying that, 13 years later, free-roaming shooter series were still trying to catch up.

Robert Purchese of Eurogamer said that The Silent Cartographer had one of the best beaches in video games, calling it "to this day [...] the greatest Halo campaign level of all time". He stated that "I found myself dumbfounded a video game could immerse me in such a heart-pumping, epic shooter battle". Saying that "what's remarkable about The Silent Cartographer is that no matter what the player does or where the player goes, it doesn't break stride", he stated that, as the player makes their way deeper underground and into the ringworld's interior, "you start to realise that everything is connected in a way that at least creates the illusion of coherence". Claiming that "the island feels real", he concludes that "back in 2001, Halo's beach blew me away. Looking back at old gameplay of The Silent Cartographer now, nearly 20 years later, it still does."

Matt Whittaker of Hardcore Gamer called the level "one of the most iconic missions in the entire series, as it blends Warthog play, labyrinthine interior sections and a blend of every type of Covenant enemy present in Halo: Combat Evolved", praising the improved visual clarity of the Hunter aliens as the best improvement to the level in Halo: The Master Chief Collection. Jonathon Dornbrush of Entertainment Weekly ranked The Silent Cartographer the best level in Halo: Combat Evolved, calling it "an impressively long but rarely tedious mission that employs all of Halo's best elements, while also introducing the brutality of Hunters". Andy Kelly of PC Gamer cited the level when professing that Halo was his favorite series game, stating, "that rousing music, the blue skies and sparkling water, the Pelican cruising over the beach, and later, the chance to bounce around in a Warthog. That's peak Halo for me, really." While he admitted that "it's really just a wider linear path than the other levels", he nonetheless added that "the scale gives you a real sense of adventure and freedom". He also included it on his list of best FPS levels of all time. Speedrunner Andrew "Goatrope" Halabourda noted that in 2004, The Silent Cartographer was the most popular single level in Halo to speedrun.

== Legacy ==
The Silent Cartographer was planned to be featured in the cancelled Halo film. The level influenced the design of future games in the series, such as the level design of Halo: Reach, due to its combination of on-foot and vehicle action, forcing players to board and exit vehicles as they traversed the level. Reach featured a level called The Long Night of Solace which was said to be "a retread of The Silent Cartographer", but which was praised by IGN for being more "epic" and "apocalyptic". The level also received a spiritual successor in the Warzone multiplayer mode of Halo 5: Guardians, which contains a level, Raid on Apex 7, that features a similar environment.

A mission inspired by the level was included in the racing game Forza Horizon 4, including a driveable Warthog.

Gene Park of The Washington Post perceived the open world campaign mode of Halo Infinite as a full-game expansion of The Silent Cartographer, a claim that Natalie Clayton of PC Gamer contested on the grounds that the level only resembles an open world deceptively, and a full-game expansion of The Silent Cartographer would be too linear to truly become one.
