= Earth City demo =

- Image from a cutscene in the demo, showing New Mombasa under attack by the Covenant
- Developer: Bungie
- Publisher: Microsoft
- Series: Halo
- Platform: Windows
- Release: 2003 (Publicly playable in 2024)
- Genre: First-person shooter
- Mode: Single-player

The Earth City demo (also known as the Halo 2 E3 demo) is a video game demo and level created by Bungie to demonstrate the gameplay of the then-upcoming first-person shooter (FPS) game Halo 2 for the trade show E3 2003. It takes place in the fictional New Mombasa, where Master Chief lands alongside a group of United Nations Space Command marines to fend off an invasion by the Covenant. Due to development difficulties, the demo was made from the ground up during heavy crunch rather than being an actual portion of the game, and a full game resembling it would not have been possible on the hardware of the time. Played live on stage rather than being accessible to attendees, it was heavily scripted. Its depiction of a "fanciful" and overly-ambitious version of Halo 2 shocked fans at the show and gave the demo legendary status despite the Earth City mission not appearing in the final game.

343 Industries announced in 2022 that it was working with modders to make the demo playable in the Master Chief Collection, and it was released in the game's Steam Workshop in 2024. The original demo executable was later leaked on 4chan the same year as part of a larger leak of Halo assets. Critics described the demo as remarkable despite its "on-rails" nature, and its insights into Halo 2's scrapped mechanics interesting.

== Gameplay ==
The demo begins with a comedic introduction by Sergeant Johnson, in which he gives a presentation, breaking the fourth wall to introduce the demo and calling attention to the fact that the gameplay is not pre-recorded. It then depicts New Mombasa under attack by the Covenant, with the player assuming the role of Master Chief, who is en route via Pelican dropship to a UNSC command post to destroy a Covenant artillery cannon that is threatening the area. After landing, he fights through a number of Covenant and rescues pinned-down Marines near the cannon, after which they order an airstrike on it and it is destroyed by Longsword space fighters. Master Chief is given dual SMGs, introducing the new gameplay element of dual-wielding.

Master Chief is faced by overwhelming Covenant forces, but is rescued by Warthog vehicles. He climbs aboard one and mans the turret until its other occupants are killed by a Brute. He is forced to exit the Warthog and kill the Brute, being attacked by a Covenant Ghost vehicle but hijacking it and turning it against the Covenant. Master Chief escapes several Brute pursuers while on the Ghost, causing them to crash into a closing blast door, but also causing the Ghost to crash. He is attacked by a Covenant transport, which drops numerous pods containing Elites that attack him. Cortana jokingly dares Master Chief to stick them with a plasma grenade, which he accepts before the demo abruptly ends.

== Development ==
The Earth City demo was originally made under major time constraints utilizing a bug-filled early version of the Halo 2 engine. It consisted of over 3400 lines of Haloscript, and was never meant to be played in a sandbox manner. While the game's engineering team bet on using a stencil lighting model that would have been "revolutionary", they realized it would not work and had to throw away two years of work, including the demo itself. This ultimately led to a different team within Bungie working on the game Phoenix - a successor to Myth - to be folded into the Halo 2 team, and Phoenix being cancelled. In 2010, Bungie first admitted that the demo was a "fake" and that the graphics engine and environments had to be thrown away, because they were implausible to put in a full game.

The demo was streamed by 343 Industries in 2018, causing fans to speculate if it would be made playable. In 2022, the studio announced that it was working with a group of modders to create the "Digsite" project, an attempt to make numerous pieces of cut content accessible to players, including the E3 demo and a cut Halo 2 level known as "Alpha Moon" taking place on Basis, a moon orbiting the Threshold gas mine in the ruins of Alpha Halo. When making the demo playable, the modders involved had to make the demo more robust, as it would break if players did not hit specific individual triggers.

A 4chan leak in 2024 included unmodified Halo assets such as the first game's MacWorld 1999 demo and the original executable of the Earth City demo. While a former member of the Digsite team denied any members of the team were responsible, the team had broken up shortly before the leak, after they had requested pay for continued work on the cut content restoration and Microsoft refused, demanding they continue on a volunteer basis, with the disgruntlement of the modding team implicated as a potential cause.

== Reception ==
Morgan Park of PC Gamer described the Earth City demo as "astounding", commending modders for preserving it. Comparing it to a Call of Duty campaign rather than a Halo game, he called it "finicky" and said that, despite the fixes, he managed to softlock the game trying to pick up a second SMG, remarking that Joe Staten must have been "sweating" playing the game on stage when it was first shown. Calling it "neat to try out Bungie's scrapped gameplay experiments", he praised a three-hit melee combo shown in the demo, but understood why it was likely removed from the finished product. He also described the demo's single-shot DMR battle rifle as "super weird" compared to the final game's three-shot version. He described the existence of the playable version of the demo as "nothing less than a miracle".
