= Library War (disambiguation) =

Library War could refer to:

== Library War franchise ==
- Library War, a Japanese light novel series and the title of its first volume
- Library War (TV series), a 2008 Japanese animated television series based on the light novel series
  - Library War: The Wings of Revolution, a 2012 Japanese animated film based on the light novel series and a sequel to the anime series
- Library Wars, a 2013 Japanese live-action film based on the light novel series
  - Library Wars: The Last Mission, a 2015 Japanese live-action film sequel

== Other uses ==
- Library War Service, a library service provided by the American Library Association to American soldiers during World War II
  - Library War Council, part of the Library War Service aimed to raise funds and solicit books and magazines

== See also ==
- British War Library, a library service for British soldiers during World War I
- Battle Library, a library operated by the Reading Borough Libraries in Reading, Berkshire, United Kingdom
- Military library
- Book censorship, including culture wars over library book bans
