= Warthog (Halo) =

Fictional armoured fighting vehicle in the Halo video game franchise

M12 FA-LRV "Warthog"
- Halo vehicle
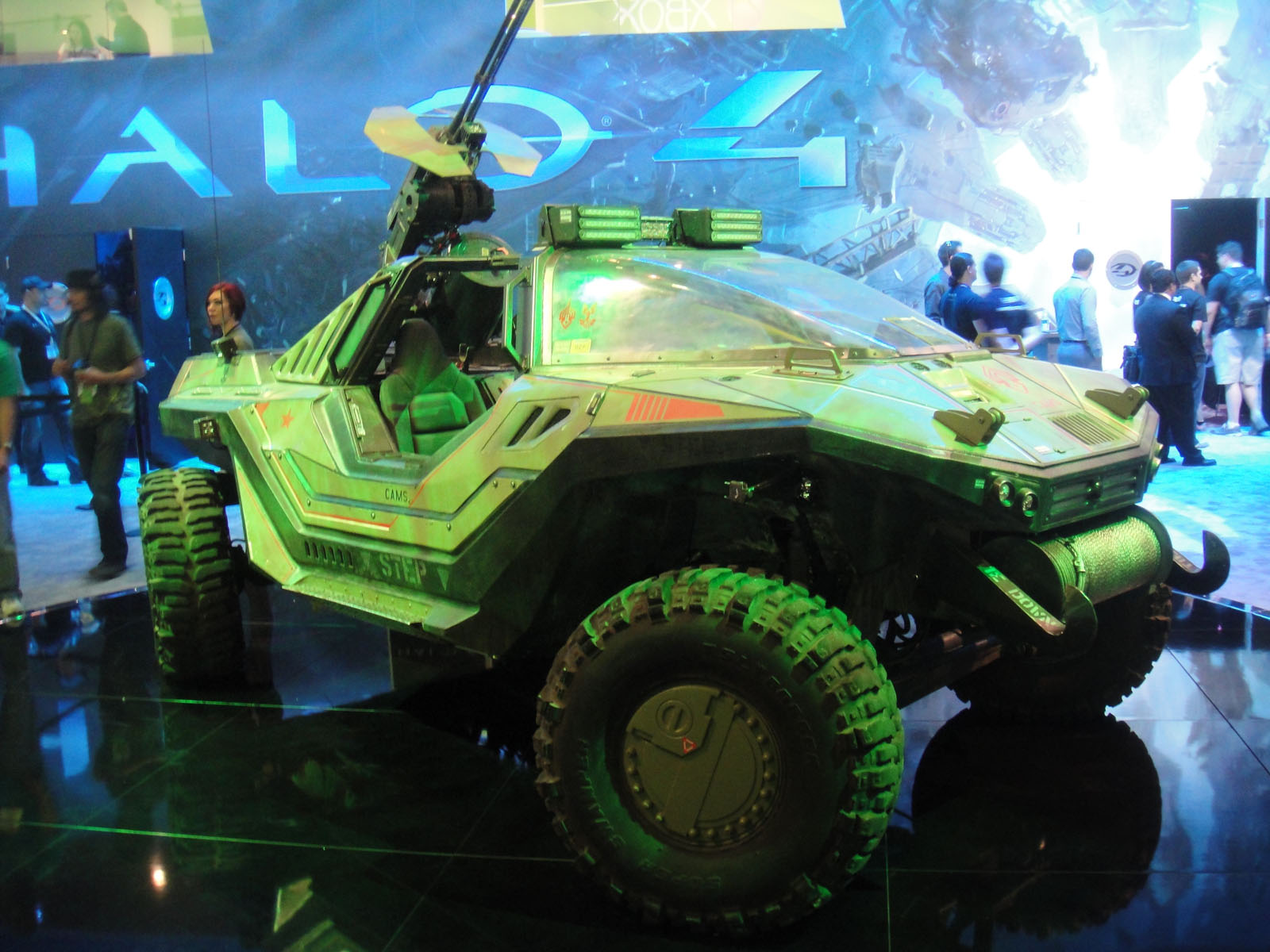
- A real Warthog replica created by Microsoft at the Halo 4 E3 booth
- First appearance: Halo: The Fall of Reach (2001)
- Created by: Marcus Lehto; Jamie Griesemer; Eric Nylund

Information
- Affiliation: United Nations Space Command (UNSC); Insurgents
- Launched: 2319

General characteristics
- Armaments: Machine gun, rocket, gauss cannon
- Maximum speed: 125 km/h (78 mph)
- Chassis: Ballistic polycarbonate and titanium
- Length: 6 meters (20 ft; M12 model); 6.3 meters (21 ft; M12B model)
- Width: 3 meters (9.8ft)
- Height: 3.2 meters (10 ft; M12 model); 2.3 meters (7.5 ft; M12B model)
- Population volume: 1-5 people

The M12 Force Application Light Reconnaissance Vehicle, nicknamed Warthog, is a fictional armoured fighting vehicle that appears in the Halo video game franchise. An anti-infantry military light utility vehicle with a rear-mounted weapon turret, it appears in most major Halo titles as a drivable vehicle. Several working replicas of the Warthog were later created in real life, including by Weta Workshop for use in the cancelled Halo film. Playing an important role in defining the level design and genre of Halo: Combat Evolved during development, the Warthog is an iconic aspect of the Halo series and praised for its design, though the manner in which it has been integrated into the series' gameplay has received a mixed response.

== Development ==
When Halo was still in development as an RTS, the Warthog was originally concepted as a tank that Master Chief, then called the "Super-Soldier", would run alongside. It was later changed to its current design, with Master Chief being made more detailed for third-person driving sections. Designer Jaime Griesemer stated that "I think the Warthog is the real reason Halo became an action game", saying that "it was so cool to watch a squad of jeeps driving across the terrain [that] we wanted to drive them ourselves". Crediting the entirety of the final design of Halo to the Warthog, he stated that "in some ways, Halo is the story of the Warthog and the universe we built to drive it around in".

== Depiction ==
The Warthog is described as a fast and maneuverable light reconnaissance vehicle. It is a four-wheeled all-terrain vehicle with a 12.7mm three-barreled machine-gun mounted in the rear. The Warthog can be crewed by three people; a driver, an armed passenger and a gunner. Halo 2 added the ability to pull a power slide in the Warthog, and an anti-armour variant (the M12G1 LAAV) armed with a 25mm gauss cannon. In the games, UNSC soldiers will climb into the Warthog when prompted to provide support to the main character, such as manning the turret.

In Halo Wars, the Warthog is a fast scouting unit which can run over enemies.

In Halo: Reach, the M12R "Rockethog" variant debuted as a usable vehicle, which differs from the base Warthog model in that it features a pair of mounted rocket launchers in the rear in place of the machine gun. In Halo Infinite, the M15 "Razorback" variant is featured for the first time as a drivable vehicle and differs from the base model in that it features four seats in the back for passengers in place of the mounted weapon, as well as heavier armor.

=== In other media ===
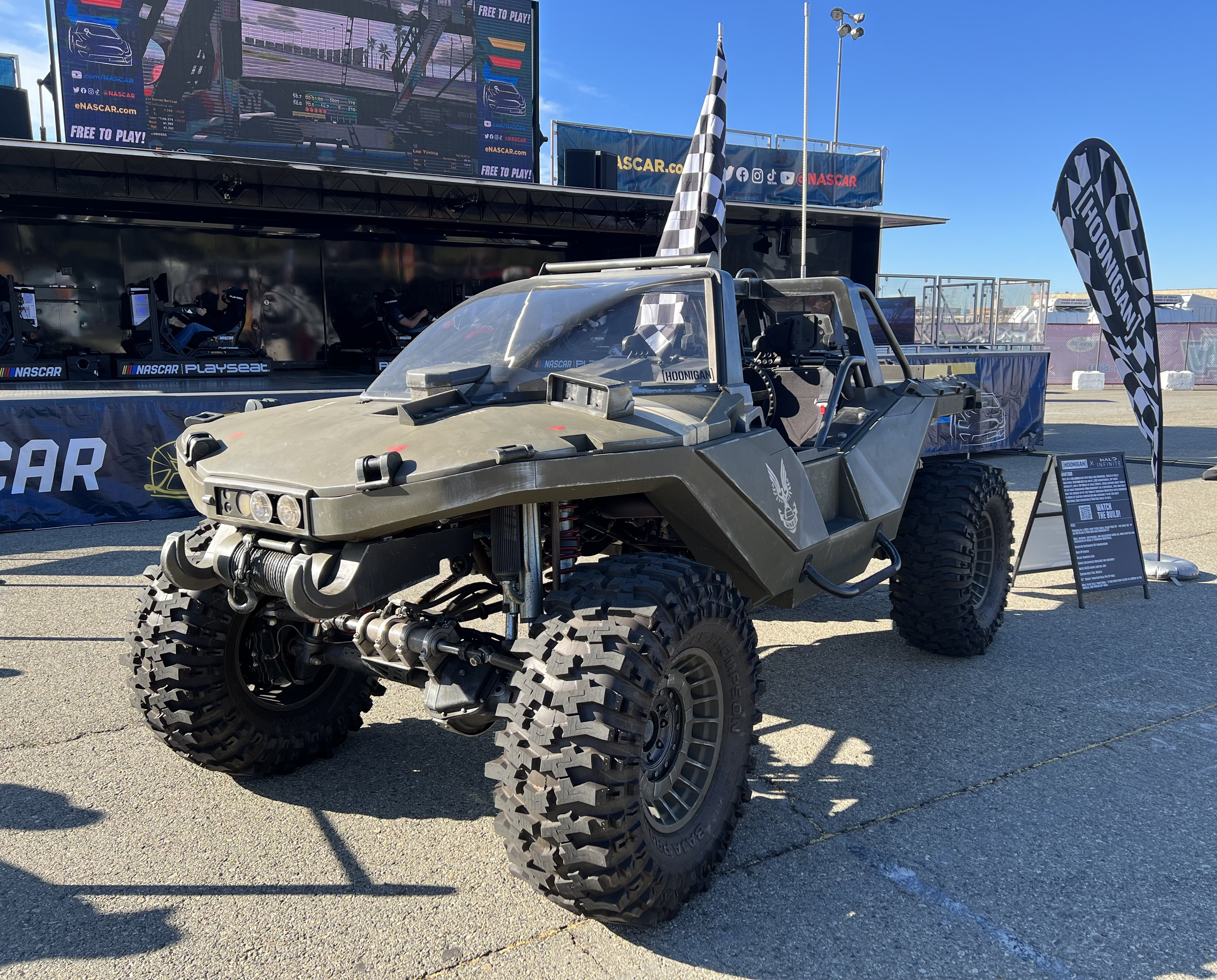
Hoonigan's Warthog at Auto Club Speedway in 2022

A life-sized Warthog replica was constructed by Weta Workshop for use in director Neill Blomkamp's cancelled Halo movie. It was based on a Nissan Patrol 4x4 truck platform and was fully functional with a six-cylinder diesel engine, four-wheel drive, custom chassis and matching body armor. In 2021, rally team Hoonigan Racing Division built a Warthog using a rock crawler's chassis, which has an independent suspension akin to the in-game Warthog, and powered by a V8 Ford small block engine. The Hoonigan Warthog appears in the film Free Guy and was featured at the movie's world premiere in New York.

The Warthog appears in Forza Motorsport 4, but it is not drivable. According to Turn 10 chief Dan Greenawalt, "...it's got some technology that's built into Halo that would have been a big investment for us to then build into the game only to support one vehicle."

The Warthog also appears as a playable vehicle in a crossover with Forza Horizon 3 and Forza Horizon 4, and in Rocket League on Xbox One.

The popular Halo machinima Red vs. Blue heavily uses the Warthog, with creator Burnie Burns saying one of his inspirations for the series was a conversation that was recreated in the second episode, where Burns and his friends discussed that the jeep looked more like a puma than a warthog. Rooster Teeth had a life-sized, fully functional Warthog given to them by an English fan, which was showcased in an episode of Red vs. Blue's fourteenth season, where it was examined how to do in real life the Warthog flip from the Halo games, where any vehicle that falls over in the game can be returned to an upright position with the click of a button. The episode ends with the Warthog exploding.

== Merchandise ==
WizKids released a Warthog model for their Halo ActionClix collectable miniatures game.

== Reception ==
The Warthog has been called a "fan favorite", and "iconic" by critics. Kristen Lee of Jalopnik stated that "the fun of the Warthog [...] is to drive around and mow down enemies with the big gun", but criticized the vehicle's handling, saying that it was "slow, sloppy in turns" and "a handful to manage", and that it had not been changed across the series. Nicole Carpenter from Polygon criticized AI drivers in the series, remarking that they "have always been pretty bad" with regards to their ability to maneuver the Warthog competently, and singled out Halo: Reach as the worst of the series in this regard.

== Cultural influence ==
The Warthog replica built by Weta Workshop was displayed at Sydney Harbour in early August 2009. Another Warthog replica was built by Halo fan Bryant Havercamp and is street-legal. A Warthog appeared along with a reveler dressed as a Spartan soldier at the 2013 Seattle Pride Parade, which was endorsed by a representative from 343 Industries.

In January 2008, Kotaku reported that the design of the then-newly unveiled Hummer HX was very similar to the Warthog, though Carl Zipfel, GM's director of exterior design denied the association. Elon Musk stated on Twitter that the Tesla Cybertruck was also inspired by the design of the Warthog, calling it "Warthog irl!"

== See also ==
- Blood Gulch
- Mako (Mass Effect)
- The Silent Cartographer
