= Halo: Combat Evolved =

2001 video game

- Developer: Bungie (Note: The Windows version was ported by Gearbox Software, while the Mac OS X version was ported by Westlake Interactive.)
- Publisher: Microsoft Game Studios (Note: The Mac OS X version was published by MacSoft.)
- Director: Jason Jones
- Composers: Martin O'Donnell; Michael Salvatori
- Series: Halo
- Platforms: Xbox; Windows; Mac OS X
- Release: November 15, 2001: Xbox; NA: November 15, 2001; PAL: March 14, 2002 Windows; NA: September 30, 2003; PAL: October 10, 2003 Mac OS X; NA: December 3, 2003 Xbox 360; WW: December 4, 2007
- Genre: First-person shooter
- Modes: Single-player, multiplayer

Halo: Combat Evolved is a 2001 first-person shooter game developed by Bungie and published by Microsoft Game Studios. The game was released on November 15, 2001 for the Xbox, with ports to Microsoft Windows and Mac OS X released in 2003. It is the first installment in the Halo franchise. Set in the 26th century, players assume the role of Master Chief, a cybernetically enhanced supersoldier. Accompanied by an artificial intelligence construct named Cortana and the human forces of the United Nations Space Command, players battle against an alien theocracy known as the Covenant while they attempt to uncover the secrets of the eponymous Halo, a ring-shaped artificial world.

Development of Halo began in 1997. Initially, it was a real-time strategy game that changed during development into a third-person shooter and finally into a first-person shooter. Microsoft acquired Bungie in 2000, intending for Halo to be a launch title for the upcoming Xbox. Despite having a troubled development, Halo introduced multiple new features not previously seen in first-person shooters, many of which became standard in the genre. The game features a local multiplayer component.

Halo was a critical and commercial success and is often cited as one of the greatest video games ever made. Particular acclaim was given for its campaign, graphics, soundtrack, and multiplayer, although minor criticism focused on the campaign's level design. More than six million copies were sold worldwide by November 2005, making it the second best-selling Xbox game and spawning a multimedia franchise. A sequel, Halo 2, was released for the Xbox in 2004. A remaster of the game, Halo: Combat Evolved Anniversary, was released for Xbox 360 by 343 Industries in 2011, and was re-released alongside the original multiplayer as part of Halo: The Master Chief Collection in 2014. A remake, Halo: Campaign Evolved, was released on PlayStation 5, Windows, and Xbox Series X/S in 2026.

== Gameplay ==
The Master Chief fires his assault rifle at a pack of enemy Grunts. Ammunition, health, and motion sensor displays are visible in the corners of the screen.

Halo: Combat Evolved is a first-person shooter game in which players primarily experience gameplay in a 3D environment from a first-person view. The player can move around and look up, down, left, or right. The game features vehicles ranging from armored tanks to alien hovercraft, many of which can be controlled by the player. The game switches to a third-person perspective during vehicle use for pilots and mounted gun operators; passengers maintain a first-person view. The game's heads-up display includes a "motion tracker" that registers moving allies, moving or firing enemies, and vehicles in a certain radius of the player.

The player character is equipped with an energy shield that nullifies damage from weapons fire and forceful impacts. The shield's charge appears as a blue bar in the corner of the game's heads-up display, and it automatically recharges if no damage is sustained for a brief period. When the shield is fully depleted, the player becomes highly vulnerable, and further damage reduces the hit points of their health meter. When this health meter reaches zero, the character dies and the game reloads from a saved checkpoint. Health can be replenished through the collection of health packs scattered around the game's levels.

The game's main enemy force is the Covenant, a group of alien species allied by belief in a common religion. Their forces include Elites, fierce warriors protected by recharging energy shields similar to the player's own; Grunts, which are short, cowardly creatures who may flee in terror if their leader is killed; Jackals, who wear a highly durable energy shield on one arm; and Hunters, large, armored creatures equipped with an explosive plasma cannon. A secondary enemy is the Flood, a parasitic alien life form that appears in several variants later in the game. Another enemy is the Sentinels, aerial robots designed by an extinct race called the Forerunners to protect their structures and prevent Flood outbreaks. Sentinels are able to hover in enclosed spaces and produce an energy shield when under attack. They lack durability but use powerful laser weapons.

The player is often aided by United Nations Space Command (UNSC) Marines, and the crew of the ship, who offer ground support, such as following the player and mimicking their tactics, and manning gun turrets or riding shotgun while the player is driving a vehicle. Marine AI and crew member AI are differentiated by their uniforms but also act distinctly; marines engage aggressively while crew members often cower or fire while retreating to cover. If the player kills too many of these friendly forces, they will attack the player in retaliation.

Players fight enemies on foot with a combination of weapons, grenades, or melee attacks. Weapons have different traits and excel in different scenarios; for example, the assault rifle has a high-capacity magazine but is less effective against energy shields. Players can hold only two weapons at once, forcing tactical decisions about which weapons to carry. Fragmentation grenades bounces and detonate quickly, whereas the plasma grenade adheres to targets before exploding.

Halo departs from traditional first-person shooter conventions by not forcing the player to holster their firearm before deploying grenades or melee-range blunt instruments; instead, both attacks can be utilized while a gun is still equipped, supplementing small-arms fire.

=== Multiplayer ===
A split screen mode allows two players to cooperatively play through Halo's campaign. The game includes five competitive multiplayer modes, which all can be customized, for between two and 16 players; up to four players may play split-screen on one Xbox, and further players can join using a System Link feature that allows up to four Xbox consoles to be connected together into a local area network. Halo lacks artificially intelligent game bots, and was released before the launch of the Xbox Live online multiplayer service; LAN parties are needed to reach the game's 16-player limit, a setup that was a first for a console game but was often deemed impractical by critics. Aside from this limitation, Halo's multiplayer components were generally well received, and it is widely considered one of the best multiplayer games of all time.

Although the Xbox version of Halo lacks official support for online multiplayer play, third-party packet tunneling software provide unofficial ways around this limitation. The Windows and Macintosh ports of Halo support online matches involving up to 16 players and include multiplayer maps, not in the original Xbox release. However, co-operative play was removed from the ports because it would have required large amounts of recoding to implement. In April 2014, it was announced that GameSpy's servers and matchmaking, on which Halo PC relied, would be shut down by May 31 of the same year. A team of fans and Bungie employees announced they would produce a patch for the game to keep its multiplayer servers online. The patch was released on May 16, 2014.

== Synopsis ==
=== Setting ===
Halo: Combat Evolved takes place in a 26th-century science fiction setting. Faster-than-light travel called slip-space allows the human race to colonize planets other than Earth. The planet Reach serves as an interstellar hub of scientific and military activity. The UNSC develops a secret program to create augmented supersoldiers known as Spartans. More than twenty years before the beginning of the game, a technologically advanced collective of alien races called the Covenant begins a religious war against humanity, declaring them an affront to their gods. Humanity's military experiences a series of crushing defeats; although the Spartans are effective against the Covenant, they are too few in number to turn the tide. In 2552, Covenant forces attack Reach and destroy the colony. The starship Pillar of Autumn escapes the planet with the Spartan Master Chief Petty Officer John-117 on board. The ship initiates a jump to slip-space, hoping to lead the enemy away from Earth.

=== Plot ===
The game begins as the Pillar of Autumn exits slip-space and its crew discovers a large ringworld structure of unknown origin. The Covenant pursues the Pillar of Autumn and attacks. With the ship heavily damaged, the Pillar of Autumn's captain, Jacob Keyes, entrusts the ship's artificial intelligence (AI) known as Cortana to Master Chief in order to prevent the Covenant from discovering the location of Earth. Keyes orders the crew to abandon the Pillar of Autumn and pilots the ship to a crash-landing on the ringworld.

On the ring's surface, Master Chief and Cortana rescue scattered survivors and help organize a counter-offensive against the Covenant. Learning that Keyes has been captured by the Covenant, Master Chief and a small contingent of soldiers rescue him from the Covenant cruiser Truth and Reconciliation. Keyes reveals that the Covenant call the ringworld "Halo" and that they believe it to be a weapon. Intent on stopping the Covenant from using Halo, Keyes searches for a potential weapons cache, while Master Chief and Cortana mount an assault on the ringworld's control room. Cortana enters Halo's computer systems and, after discovering something horrifying, sends Master Chief to find and stop Keyes from continuing his search and uncovering what lies within the ring.

Searching for the captain, Master Chief encounters a new enemy, the parasitic Flood. The release of the Flood prompts Halo's caretaker, a robot called 343 Guilty Spark, to enlist Master Chief's help in activating Halo's defenses. After Master Chief retrieves the ring's activation index, 343 Guilty Spark transports him back to Halo's control room. Cortana intervenes before Master Chief can activate the ring; she has discovered the purpose of the installation is to destroy all sentient life in the galaxy, starving the Flood of potential hosts. When Cortana refuses to surrender Halo's activation index, 343 Guilty Spark attacks her and Master Chief.

To stop Halo's activation, Master Chief and Cortana decide to destroy the installation. Needing Keyes' neural implants to destroy the Pillar of Autumn and Halo with it, Master Chief returns to the Truth and Reconciliation. He finds that Keyes has been assimilated by the Flood and retrieves the neural implant from the captain's remains. After 343 Guilty Spark stops them from using Pillar of Autumn's self-destruct, Master Chief and Cortana destabilize the Pillar of Autumn's reactors instead, narrowly escaping the ensuing detonation in a fighter. Cortana justifies their actions to destroy the Covenant fleet and stop the Flood threat and believes the fight is finished, but Master Chief states they are only getting started. In a post-credits scene, 343 Guilty Spark is seen floating through space, having survived the ring's destruction.

== Development ==
=== Early development ===
The first official promotional image for Halo, depicting early versions of the shipping game's vehicles and protagonist Master Chief

Halo was conceived as an indirect successor to Bungie's previous first-person shooter games, Marathon and Marathon 2: Durandal. After the 1995 release of Durandal, Bungie considered ideas for their next game and wanted to try something other than a direct sequel. One of the ideas that the team began to develop was that of a first-person shooter game described by co-founder Jason Jones as "the natural extension of Marathon, which would have turned out to be something along the lines of Quake". Concurrently, the team explored the concept of a vehicular combat game that featured tank battles in a futuristic setting, internally dubbed "The Giant Bloody War Game". Jones started the design of a 3D engine that could generate height-mapped graphics to visualize elevated surfaces, and he eventually suggested that Bungie use the technology to realize the "tank combat" idea. The team was enthusiastic about that prospect and proceeded to cancel their first-person shooter project in order to commit to the creation of "The Giant Bloody War Game". However, Jones struggled to implement a physics model to simulate vehicles in the game, which led Bungie to change their plans and develop the real-time strategy game (RTS) Myth: The Fallen Lords, released in 1997.

Around this time, Bungie comprised around 15 people working in Chicago, Illinois. After Myth was completed and Bungie decided on a sequel, Myth II: Soulblighter, Jones delegated its development to the company's other designers and resumed his work on the technology that had not been applied to the 1997 title. A group of three Bungie staffers began to develop an RTS with a focus on science fiction, realistic physics simulations and three-dimensional terrain. Early versions used the Myth engine and isometric perspective. The project had the initial working title Armor, which was changed as it was "boring" and as the project changed dramatically from the original concept. It was renamed Monkey Nuts, then Blam! after Jones could not bring himself to tell his mother the previous name.

Experimenting with ways of controlling units, Bungie added a mode that attached the camera to individual units. The vantage point continually moved closer to the units as the developers realized it would be more fun for players to drive the vehicles themselves, rather than have the computer do it. "And controlling [the vehicle], just that double tactile nature of load a dude in, get a dude out, hands on the steering wheel—it was like, this shouldn't be an RTS game," recalled Seropian. By mid-1998 the game had become a third-person shooter.

Peter Tamte, Bungie's then-executive vice president, used his contacts from his former position at Apple to get writer Joseph Staten and Jones an audience with CEO Steve Jobs. Jobs, impressed, agreed to debut the game at the 1999 Macworld Conference & Expo. Anticipation built for the game after favorable reviews from industry journalists under non-disclosure agreements at Electronic Entertainment Expo (E3) 1999.

Days before the Macworld announcement, Blam! still had no permanent title; possible names included The Santa Machine, Solipsis, The Crystal Palace, Hard Vacuum, Star Maker, and Star Shield. Bungie hired a branding firm that came up with the name Covenant, but Bungie artist Paul Russell suggested alternatives, including Halo. Though some did not like the name—likening it to something religious, or a women's shampoo—designer Marcus Lehto said, "it described enough about what our intent was for this universe in a way that created this sense of mystery." On July 21, 1999, Bungie officially unveiled Halo, with Jobs announcing its simultaneous release on MacOS and Windows.

The game's premise at this point involved a human transport starship that crash-lands on a mysterious ringworld. Early versions of the Covenant arrive to loot what they can, and war erupts between them and the humans. Unable to match the technologically advanced alien race, the humans resort to guerrilla warfare. At this point, Bungie promised an open-world game with terrain that reacted and deformed from explosions, persistent environment details such as spent shell casings, and variable weather. These early versions featured Halo-specific fauna, later dropped following design difficulties and the creatures' detraction from the surprise appearance of the Flood. The Master Chief was simply known as the cyborg. When Halo was shown again at E3 in June 2000, it was still a third-person shooter.

=== Move to Xbox ===
Bungie's financial situation during Halo's development was precarious. Ahead of Myth II: Soulblighter's release, Bungie was surviving on Myth sales and had missed release dates. A glitch that caused Myth II to wipe the contents of the directory it was installed to was discovered only after 200,000 copies had been produced for the December 1998 launch. Bungie recalled the copies and issued a fix, costing the company $800,000. As a result, Bungie sold a share of the company and publishing rights to Take-Two Interactive. Still facing financial pressure, Peter Tamte contacted Ed Fries, the head of Microsoft Game Studios, about a possible acquisition. Fries was working on developing the software lineup for Microsoft's first game console, the Xbox. Fries negotiated an agreement with Take-Two Interactive wherein Microsoft gained Bungie and the rights to Halo, while Take-Two kept the Myth and Oni properties. Jones and Seropian pitched the purchase to the rest of Bungie as the way they could shape the future of a new game console. Microsoft announced its acquisition of Bungie on June 19, 2000. Halo was now to be the tentpole launch game for the Xbox.

Bungie now had about nine months to compile the loose gameplay and story concepts of Halo into a finished product to be released on the Xbox, still an experimental hardware platform. To make players feel more connected to the action, Jason Jones pushed to turn the game's perspective from third-person to first-person. A key concern was making sure the game played well on the Xbox's gamepad; at the time, first-person shooters on consoles were rare. Spearheading the effort, designer Jaime Griesemer wrote code to discern player intent and assist the player's movement and aiming without being obvious. The game buffered player inputs so that the result was the desired player movement, rather than the movement players were actually making.

In the rush to complete Halo, other Bungie projects were scrapped and their teams absorbed. Griesemer said that after the Bungie team moved to the Microsoft campus in Redmond, Washington, he was so busy he did not unpack his belongings for six months. The designers prototyped encounters and enemy artificial intelligence on a sandbox level, "B30". The success of gameplay on this small chunk of the game energized the team, and B30 became "The Silent Cartographer", the fourth mission.

To make the release date, Bungie made drastic cuts to the game's features and scope. The open-world plans were scrapped, and it became clear the lengthy planned campaign was not feasible. One level was cut and replaced with an expositional cutscene. Staten described his role as putting "story duct tape" over gaps that appeared to smooth them over. To save time, Lehto suggested reusing campaign levels; glowing directional arrows were added after playtesters got lost backtracking. Microsoft game writers Eric Trautmann and Brannon Boren performed last-minute rewrites to the script. An online multiplayer component was dropped because Xbox Live would not be ready. Only four months before release, it was decided that the multiplayer was still not fun, so it was scrapped and rebuilt from scratch, using team members who joined after finishing Oni. Some personnel took to sleeping in the office for the last few months to make sure the game made its deadline.

=== Design ===
Bungie's social culture—and the rush to complete the game—meant that team members provided input and feedback across disciplines. Aspects such as level design demanded collaboration between the designers creating the environments for players to explore, and the artists who developed those environments' aesthetics. Initially, artists Robert McLees and Lehto were the only artists working on what would become Halo. Bungie hired Shi Kai Wang as an additional artist to refine Lehto's designs. The aliens making up the Covenant began with varied exploratory designs that coalesced once each enemy's role in the gameplay was defined.

Spearheaded by Paul Russell, the game's visual design changed in response to the changing gameplay and story. The artists made efforts to distinguish each faction in the game by their architecture, technology, and weaponry. The UNSC's original curved look was made blockier to distinguish it from the Covenant; likewise human weapons remained projectile-based to provide a contrast to the Covenant's energy weapons, and their vehicles based on animals, with the Warthog being inspired by Lehto's love of off-roading. The interiors of Pillar of Autumn drew significant influence from the production design of the film Aliens. Organic, curvilinear forms along with a color palette of greens and purples were used for the Covenant, while the Forerunner came to be defined by their angular constructions; the interiors originally drew on Aztec patterns and the work of Louis Sullivan, before being refined five months from the game's completion.

=== Audio ===
Composer Martin O'Donnell and his company TotalAudio were tasked with creating the music for Halo's MacWorld debut. Staten told O'Donnell that the music should give a feeling of ancient mystery. O'Donnell decided Gregorian chant would be appropriate, and he performed the vocals alongside his composing partner Michael Salvatori and additional singers. The structure of the Beatles song "Yesterday" influenced the resulting theme. Because he did not know how long the presentation would be, O'Donnell created "smushy" opening and closing sections that could be expanded or cut as the time required to back up a rhythmic middle section. The music was recorded in Chicago and sent to New York for the show the same night the piece was finished.

Shortly before Bungie was bought by Microsoft, O'Donnell joined Bungie as a staff member, while Salvatori remained at TotalAudio. O'Donnell designed the music so that it "could be dissembled and remixed in such a way that would give [him] multiple, interchangeable loops that could be randomly recombined in order to keep the piece interesting as well as a variable-length". Development involved the creation of "alternative middle sections that could be transitioned to if the game called for such a change (i.e. less or more intense)".

O'Donnell sat with the level designers to walk through the levels, constructing music that would adapt to the gameplay rather than be static: "The level designer would tell me what he hoped a player would feel at certain points or after accomplishing certain tasks." Based on this information, O'Donnell developed cues the designer could script into the level, and then he and the designer played through the mission to see if the audio worked. He made sparse use of music because he believes that music is "best used in a game to quicken the emotional state of the player and it works best when used least". He also stated that "[if] music is constantly playing it tends to become sonic wallpaper and loses its impact when it is needed to truly enhance some dramatic component of gameplay". The cutscenes came so late that O'Donnell had to score them in only three days.

== Release ==
Ed Fries described the period before the Xbox's launch as chaotic: "You've got to imagine this environment of panic combined with adrenaline, but money's mostly no object at the same time. So we were spending lots of it, trying to do all this crazy stuff." After several planned video game tie-ins to Steven Spielberg's film A.I. Artificial Intelligence were scrapped, it became clear that Halo had to serve as the tentpole title for the Xbox, a role which the game was never intended to fill.

Halo's debut had been well received, but its move to the unproven Xbox console caused press treatment to be colder than it was before. While a playable demonstration of the game at Gamestock 2001 was well received, critics had mixed reactions to its exhibition at E3 2001, where the game was shown off in a very broken state, with poor frame rates and technical issues.

Even within Microsoft, Halo was divisive. After Bungie refused to change the Halo name to appease marketing research teams, the subtitle "Combat Evolved" was added to make it more descriptive and compete better with other military-themed games. Fries recalled analysts had suggested that Halo had the "wrong" color palette compared to competing console games; Fries never showed the results to Bungie.

The game was released in North America simultaneously with the Xbox on November 15, 2001.

Halo: The Fall of Reach, a prequel novel to Halo: Combat Evolved, was released a few weeks before the game. Science fiction author Eric S. Nylund penned the novel in seven weeks. The novel was nearly killed halfway to completion; Nylund credits Trautmann with saving it. The Fall of Reach became a Publishers Weekly bestseller with almost two hundred thousand copies sold. The game itself would be novelized with Halo: The Flood, written by William C. Dietz and released in 2003.

On July 12, 2002, a Halo port for Windows was announced to be under development by Gearbox Software. Its showing at E3 2003 was positively received by some critics, with skepticism by others. It was released on September 30, 2003, and included support for online multiplayer play and featured sharper graphics, but had optimization issues that caused poor performance. Halo was later released for Mac OS X on December 11, 2003. On December 4, 2007, the game became available for the Xbox 360 via download from the Xbox Live Marketplace.

=== Sales ===
While Halo was not an instant runaway success on release, it had a long tail sales rate and a very high attach rate for the Xbox; during the two months following Halo's release, the game sold alongside more than 50% of Xbox consoles. One million units had been sold roughly five months after release, a faster pace than that of any previous sixth-generation console game. The game sold three million copies worldwide by July 2003, and four million by January 2004. By July 2006, its Xbox version had sold 4.2 million copies and earned $170 million in the United States alone, while its computer version sold 670,000 copies and earned $22.2 million. Next Generation ranked it as the second highest-selling game launched for the PlayStation 2, Xbox or GameCube between January 2000 and July 2006 in the United States.

== Reception ==
Reception

Aggregate score
| Aggregator | Score |
|---|---|
| Metacritic | Xbox: 97/100; PC: 83/100 |

Review scores
| Publication | Score |
|---|---|
| 1Up.com | A+ |
| AllGame | 4/5 |
| Edge | 10/10 |
| Eurogamer | 8/10 |
| Famitsu | 9/10, 8/10, 7/10, 9/10 |
| Game Informer | 9.5/10 |
| GameSpot | 9.7/10 |
| GameSpy | 80/100 |
| IGN | 9.7/10 |
| Next Generation | 5/5 |
| Official Xbox Magazine (US) | 9.5/10 |

Halo received widespread critical acclaim, with a 97 out of 100 on review aggregator Metacritic, based on reviews from 68 professional critics. Ste Curran's review for Edge praised the game as "the most important launch game for any console, ever" and commented, "GoldenEye was the standard for multiplayer console combat. It has been surpassed."

GameSpot claimed that "Halo's single-player game is worth picking up an Xbox for alone", concluding, "Not only is this easily the best of the Xbox launch games, but it's easily one of the best shooters ever, on any platform." IGN remarked similarly, calling Halo a "can't miss, no-brainer, sure thing, five star, triple A game". Gary Whitta of Official Xbox Magazine called Halo "a stunning achievement". AllGame editor Jonathan Licata praised Bungie for doing "a remarkable job with Halo, taking many successful elements from previous standouts in the genre to make one very playable game". Among the specific aspects that reviewers praised were the balance of weapons, the role of drivable vehicles, and the artificial intelligence of enemies.

The Xbox version of Halo received more than forty awards. Among them were numerous Game of the Year awards, including from the Academy of Interactive Arts & Sciences, Electronic Gaming Monthly, Edge, and IGN. GameSpot named Halo the third-best console game of 2001, and it won the publication's annual "Best Xbox Game" and, among console games, "Best Shooting Game" awards. It was a runner-up in the "Best Sound" category. The British Academy of Film and Television Arts awarded Halo "Best Console Game" and Rolling Stone presented it with their "Best Original Soundtrack" award. Halo also won The Electric Playground's 2001 "Best Console Shooter" award, the "11th Annual GamePro Readers' Choice Awards" for "Best Combat Game of The Year", (Note: The Xbox Version of Halo won the awards which voted by the general public, over the Unreal Tournament (Epic Games/Infogrames), Quake III: Revolution (Activision/EA/Squaresoft), and the PlayStation 2 Version of Half-Life (Vivendi-Universal).) and Golden Joystick Awards for "Xbox Game of the Year" in 2002. (Note: The 2002 Golden Joystick Awards was hosted by Jonathan Ross of Friday Night with Jonathan Ross and Japanorama.) as well as Spike Video Game Awards for "Best PC Game" in 2003.

Halo: Combat Evolved won four awards at the 5th Annual Interactive Achievement Awards (now known as the D.I.C.E. Awards): "Game of the Year", "Console Game of the Year", "Console Action/Adventure Game of the Year", and "Outstanding Achievement in Visual Engineering"; it also received nominations for "Outstanding Innovation in Console Gaming", "Outstanding Achievement in Game Design", "Outstanding Achievement in Game Play Engineering", and "Outstanding Achievement in Art Direction"

Next Generation reviewed the Xbox version of the game, rating it five stars out of five, and stated that "If you didn't think there was a reason to buy an Xbox, Halo will change your mind."

Although Halo's overall reception was largely positive, the game received criticism for its level design. GameSpy commented, "You'll trudge through countless hallways and control rooms that all look exactly the same, fighting identical-looking groups of enemies over and over and over...it is simply frustrating to see a game with such groundbreaking sequences too often degenerate [into] this kind of mindless, repetitive action." Similarly, an article on Game Studies.org remarked, "In the latter part of the game, the scenarios rely on repetition and quantity rather than innovativeness and quality." Eurogamer concluded, "Halo is very much a game of two halves. The first half is fast, exciting, beautifully designed and constantly full of surprises. The second half is festooned with gobsmacking plot twists and great cinematics but let down by repetitive paint-by-numbers level design." Halo was released prior to the launch of Xbox Live, and the lack of both online multiplayer and bots to simulate human players was criticized by GameSpy. In 2003, Gamespy included Halo in a list of "Top 25 Most Overrated Games of All Time".

Halo's PC port received generally favorable reviews, garnering a score of 83% on Metacritic. GameSpot stated that it was "still an incredible action game ... [and] a true classic," awarding it 9.0 out of 10. It received a score of 8.2 out of 10 from IGN, who stated, "If you've played the game on the Xbox, there's not much for you here." Eurogamer called the game "a missed opportunity" but stated that the online multiplayer component was "a massive draw ... for Halo veterans". The PC Port of Halo was heavily criticized for having poor performance issues even on a Athlon 64 or Pentium 4 Extreme Edition-Based High-end PC at that time.

Halo has been praised as one of the greatest video games of all time, and was ranked by IGN as the fourth-best first-person shooter made. In 2017, The Strong National Museum of Play inducted Halo to its World Video Game Hall of Fame.

== Legacy ==
Halo is credited with modernizing the FPS genre. According to GameSpot, Halo's "numerous subtle innovations have been borrowed by countless other games since". The game is often cited as the main reason for the Xbox's success, and it began what is commonly regarded as the system's flagship franchise. In July 2006, Next-Gen.biz published an article estimating Halo as the second-highest revenue-generating 21st century console video game in the United States, behind Grand Theft Auto: Vice City. The game's popularity sparked the usage of terms such as "Halo clone" and "Halo killer", applied to games either similar to or anticipated to be better than it. The Halo engine was used for the game Stubbs the Zombie in Rebel Without a Pulse.

Halo has been featured at both Major League Gaming and the World Cyber Games. The game's sequel, Halo 2, made US$125 million with unit sales of 2.38 million on the first day of its release, earning it the distinction of the fastest-selling United States media product in history. Three years later, Halo 3 shattered that record with the biggest opening day in entertainment history, taking in US$170 million in its first 24 hours.

In addition, the game inspired and was used in the fan-created Red vs. Blue video series, which is credited as the "first big success" of machinima (the technique of using real-time 3D engines, often from video games, to create animated films). Ed Fries, former vice president of Microsoft's game publishing, created a freeware demake Halo titled Halo 2600 for the Atari 2600 in 2010.

It has been called one of the best video games of all time.

=== Halo: Custom Edition ===
On March 15, 2004, Gearbox Software released Halo: Custom Edition for Windows, which enabled players to use custom-made maps and game modifications via the Halo Editing Kit developed by Bungie. Halo: Custom Edition consists of multiplayer maps and requires an original copy of Combat Evolved to install. Custom maps can be both single and multiplayer.

=== Remaster ===
During the Microsoft press conference at the 2011 E3 Expo, it was revealed that Halo: Combat Evolved would be remade by 343 Industries with an in-house game engine and would include achievements, Terminals, and Skulls. It was released for the Xbox 360 on November 15, 2011. The release date marks the 10th anniversary of the original game's release. The remastered version of the original game includes online multiplayer and cooperative play functionality. The remaster is also the first Halo game to include Kinect support. The game is a mix of two game engines—the original Halo engine created by Bungie, which provides gameplay, and a new engine created by 343 Industries and Saber that is responsible for improved graphics—and the player is able to switch between the improved and classic modes of the game at any time. The game's multiplayer component uses the Halo: Reach gameplay engine, tailored with a map playlist to mimic the original multiplayer, as opposed to including the original game's multiplayer mode.

Anniversary was later included as part of Halo: The Master Chief Collection. The single-player campaign is nearly identical to the Xbox 360 version, including the ability to swap between the updated "anniversary" graphics and the original game graphics, but excluding Stereoscopic 3DTV support. However, unlike the Xbox 360 release, the multiplayer component uses the original multiplayer engine from Combat Evolved as opposed to Halo: Reach and is playable over Xbox Live.

=== Remake ===
In October 2025, a remake of the Combat Evolved campaign, titled Halo: Campaign Evolved, was announced, and was released in 2026 for Windows, Xbox Series X/S, and PlayStation 5, marking the first release of a Halo game on PlayStation platforms. Developed using Unreal Engine 5, Campaign Evolved features upgraded visuals and bonus story missions. The original multiplayer mode is not included, but up to four players may play the campaign cooperatively online. Xbox Game Studios president Matt Booty stated that the decision was made to bring the Halo franchise to PlayStation in order to "meet people where they are" as part of a strategic shift away from exclusivity.
