= Halo: Reach =

2010 video game

- Developer: Bungie (Note: 343 Industries and Certain Affinity assisted on post-launch development.)
- Publisher: Microsoft Game Studios
- Director: Marcus Lehto
- Composers: Martin O'Donnell; Michael Salvatori
- Series: Halo
- Platform: Xbox 360
- Release: September 14, 2010
- Genre: First-person shooter
- Modes: Single-player, multiplayer

Halo: Reach is a 2010 first-person shooter video game developed by Bungie and published by Microsoft Game Studios for the Xbox 360 console. It is the sixth installment in the Halo series, and a direct prequel to Halo: Combat Evolved. The game takes place in the year 2552, where humanity is locked in a war with an alien theocracy known as the Covenant, which seeks to exterminate humanity. Players control Noble Six, a member of an elite squad of supersoldiers, known as Noble Team, attempting to stage a defense of the human world known as Reach, which falls under Covenant attack.

After releasing Halo 3 in 2007, Bungie split into teams to develop two different games—what would become Halo 3: ODST and Reach. The developers decided to create a prequel to the original Halo game trilogy, freeing themselves from the obligation of addressing old story threads. As the game would take place on a human world doomed to be destroyed, they focused on making the environment a character unto itself. Longtime Halo composers Martin O'Donnell and Michael Salvatori returned to compose Reach's music, aiming for a more somber sound to match the story.

Reach was announced at E3 2009 in Los Angeles, and the first in-engine trailer was shown at the 2009 Spike Video Game Awards. Players who purchased ODST were eligible to participate in a Reach multiplayer beta in May 2010; the beta allowed Bungie to gain player feedback for fixing bugs and making gameplay tweaks before shipping the final version. Microsoft gave Reach its biggest game marketing budget yet and created award-winning live-action commercials, action figures, and interactive media to promote the game.

Reach was released worldwide in September 2010, and grossed US$200 million on its launch day, setting a new record for the franchise. Reach sold well in most territories, moving more than three million units its first month in North America. It received critical acclaim; reviewers from publications such as GamePro, IGN, and Official Xbox Magazine called it the best Halo title yet. Critics generally praised the gameplay, graphics, sound, and darker tone, with opinions on the plot and characters being somewhat more mixed. Reach was Bungie's final Halo game; subsequent games have been overseen by Microsoft subsidiary 343 Industries, later known as Halo Studios. Halo: Reach was re-released as part of Halo: The Master Chief Collection in 2019 for Windows and Xbox One.

== Gameplay ==
The player character fires an assault rifle at enemy Covenant forces, flanked by members of Noble Team.

Halo: Reach is a first-person shooter in which players predominantly experience gameplay from a first-person perspective; the game perspective switches to third-person when using certain weapons, equipments, and vehicles, as well as when a player dies. Gameplay is more similar to Halo: Combat Evolved than later games in the series. The player's heads-up display shows and tracks a player's current weapons, abilities, and health; it also contains a compass and a "motion tracker" that registers moving allies, enemies, and vehicles in a certain radius of the player. The HUD changes when the player pilots vehicles.

In the game's campaign, which can be played alone or cooperatively, players assume the role of Noble Six, a supersoldier engaged in combat with the alien collective known as the Covenant. The Covenant come in eight distinct varieties with different ranks and classes for each type; for example, Elites are the leaders of a group, while Grunts are less intelligent and only dangerous in large groups. The player is equipped with a recharging energy shield that absorbs damage from weapons, fire and impacts. When the energy shield is depleted, the player loses health. When the player's health reaches zero, the character dies and the game reloads from a saved checkpoint. Health is replenished using health packs scattered throughout Reach's levels. The campaign's encounters with enemies are typically large, open spaces with weapons caches, cover from enemy fire and strategic vantage points. New to the Halo series are dogfight sequences set in space.

Reach features updated versions of old weapons, plus new weapons fulfilling various combat roles. In Halo 3, players can carry single-use equipment power-ups that offer temporary offensive or defensive advantages. This system of single-use equipment is replaced in Reach by reusable and persistent armor abilities that remain with a character until they are replaced by a different equipment. The abilities are sprint, which allows the player to move at an increased rate for several seconds; jetpack, which allows the player to fly for a limited time; active camouflage, which makes a player harder to see (the less the player moves, the more camouflaged they will be); hologram, which creates a facsimile of the player running towards a target point; drop shield, which creates a bubble that heals those inside and protects them from a limited amount of damage; and armor lock, which immobilizes the player, but grants invincibility for a brief period of time. When the player exits armor lock, they release a close range EMP, breaking nearby players' shields and pushing away movable objects. If a vehicle rams a player that is armor locking, the vehicle will sustain heavy damage. When playing as Covenant Elites, players also have access to an evade armor ability which allows the player to quickly dash in any direction.

=== Multiplayer ===
Reach supports player-versus-player multiplayer through split-screen on a single Xbox, local networks (System Link), and the Xbox Live service before servers were shut down in January 2022. The game includes standard multiplayer modes such as "Slayer" and Capture The Flag, as well as game types new to the franchise. In "Headhunter", players drop skulls upon death, which other players can pick up and deposit at special zones for points. When players die, all their accumulated skulls are dropped. "Stockpile" has teams race to collect neutral flags, holding them at capture points every minute for points. "Generator Defense" pits three human supersoldiers, or Spartans, against three Covenant soldiers called Elites. The Elites' objective is to destroy three generators, while the Spartans defend the installation. After every round, the players switch roles. "Invasion" is a six versus six mode with three squads of two on each team. The game type matches Spartans against Elites; Elites vie for control of territories to disable a shield guarding a navigation core. Once the shield is disabled, they must transfer the core to a dropship; the Spartans must prevent this. As the game progresses, new vehicles and areas of the map become open. The gameplay for Spartans and Elites is similar, but not identical. Elites are larger, move faster, and can fully regenerate their health. Depending on the game mode the player chooses, Spartans and Elites have different default loadouts. However, if playing locally, the player can alter the loadouts for both Spartans and Elites to be whatever the player chooses in the settings menu.

Alongside other multiplayer options is "firefight", where players take on increasingly difficult waves of foes in a game of survival. Players can customize the firefight options, including the number and types of enemies. Firefight versus allows a player-controlled Elite team to try to stop a Spartan team from scoring points. Game modes like generator defense are also playable in firefight.

=== Forge World ===
Also included with Reach is "Forge", a level editor. Players can edit the default multiplayer maps and a large empty map known as "Forge World", the largest map ever created in the Halo series and designed and built by art lead Steve Cotton. Players can add or modify spawn points, weapons and items. Objects may be phased into other objects, and can also be snapped to specific orientations. Other included features are the "theater", where players can watch saved films of their games and take screenshots and video clips for posterity, and the file share, where players can upload their screenshots, films, custom maps, and gametypes for public viewing.

== Synopsis ==
=== Setting and characters ===
Reach takes place in a futuristic science fiction setting; the year is 2552, shortly before the events of the video game Halo: Combat Evolved, and during the events of the novel Halo: The Fall of Reach. Halo: Reach largely ignores the canon and timeline of events established in the novel, leading to several plot inconsistencies in the franchise. Humans, under the auspices of the United Nations Space Command (UNSC), have been waging a long war against a collective of alien races known as the Covenant. By the events of Reach, almost all of humanity's interstellar colonies have fallen. Reach itself is an Earth-like colony that serves as the UNSC's main military hub in the system of Epsilon Eridani. The colony is home to over 700 million civilians in addition to the military presence there.

The game follows the actions of "Noble Team", a UNSC special operations unit composed of elite supersoldiers known as Spartans. Players assume the role of a new addition to the team identified by the call sign Noble Six. Noble Team's leader is Carter-A259, a no-nonsense soldier. His second-in-command, Catherine-B320 (referred to by other team members as "Kat"), has a bionic arm; together, Carter and Kat are the only remaining original members of Noble Team. The other current members include heavy weapons specialist and surviving Spartan-II Jorge-052, assault specialist Emile-A239, and marksman Jun-A266.

=== Plot ===
Noble Six meets the rest of Noble Team, shortly before they are dispatched to investigate why a communications relay has gone offline. They discover Covenant forces have invaded Reach. The team is relocated to defend Sword Base, an Office of Naval Intelligence (ONI) installation, from a Covenant assault. After repelling the attack, Noble Team meets Catherine Halsey, a scientist and the mastermind behind the Spartan program and their MJOLNIR powered armor. Halsey enquires about Noble's engagement at the relay, suspecting that the Covenant were attempting to retrieve highly classified ONI data from the site.

Jun and Six discover an invasion force gathering on the planet. The UNSC launches an assault the next morning to repel the invasion. Noble Team assists the strike force, targeting key artillery stations and command posts. A cloaked Covenant supercarrier reveals itself; lacking a conventional weapon to destroy the carrier, Jorge and Six smuggle a slipspace engine onto a Covenant corvette en route to refuel at the carrier. With the timer damaged, Jorge drops Six out of the hangar of the corvette, remaining behind to detonate the engine manually and destroy the carrier. Another Covenant fleet arrives soon afterwards.

Back on the surface, Six assists with city defense and civilian evacuation and reunites with Noble Team, but Kat is killed by a Covenant sniper. Recalled to Sword Base for a scorched earth demolition mission, Noble Team is redirected underground by Halsey to an ancient alien artifact, which she believes is vital to winning the war against the Covenant. Noble Team is entrusted with transporting the artificial intelligence Cortana and her data on the artifact to the UNSC ship Pillar of Autumn, docked at a shipyard. Jun leaves the team to escort Halsey to safety.

En route to the Pillar of Autumn, Carter is wounded and sacrifices himself to allow Six and Emile to reach the shipyard. Emile uses a mass driver emplacement to defend the Autumn against enemies while Six gives Cortana to Autumn's captain, Jacob Keyes. When Emile is killed, Six remains behind to operate the gun and ensure Autumn's escape. Cortana, using the data from the alien artifact, leads the Autumn to a Halo ringworld, leading to the events of Halo: Combat Evolved. In a post-credits scene, Six fights a last stand against overwhelming Covenant forces. In 2589, Six's helmet remains on the grassy plains of a now-restored Reach. A narration by Halsey eulogizes Noble Team, who enabled humanity's victory over the Covenant.

== Development ==
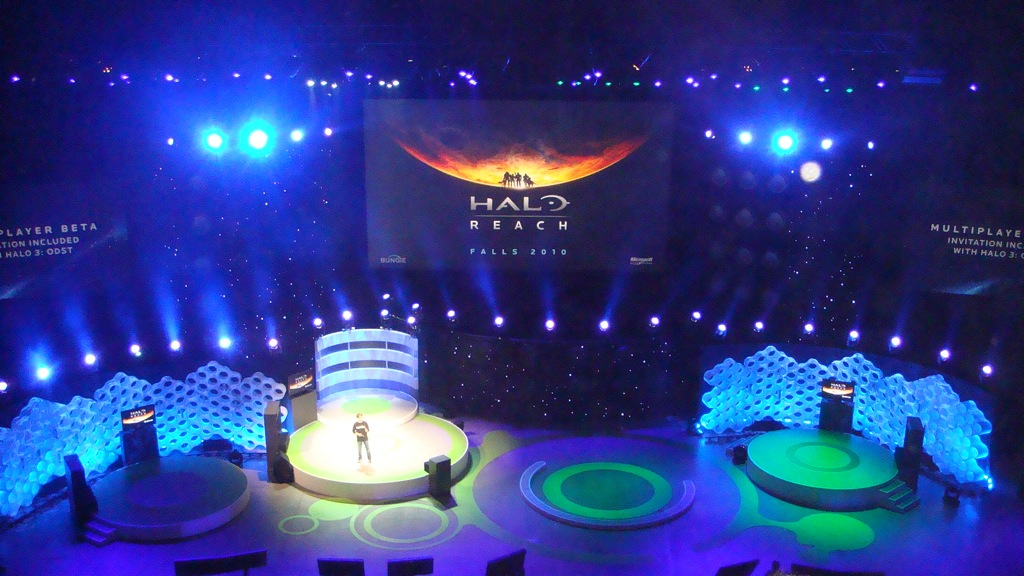
Reach's E3 announcement

=== Announcements and teasers ===
Halo: Reach was announced on June 1, 2009, accompanied by a trailer at the Microsoft Electronic Entertainment Expo (E3) press conference. A press release announced that an invitation to the open multiplayer beta of the game would appear in 2010. Reach is the final game in the Halo series developed by Bungie; responsibility for developing future Halo titles fell to Microsoft subsidiary 343 Industries, beginning with Halo: Combat Evolved Anniversary in 2011.

A trailer released March 3, 2010, showcased the game's multiplayer. Bungie revealed parts of the game's campaign and Firefight at E3 2010. The game reached the "zero bug release" milestone on June 23, signifying a shift from content creation to troubleshooting; buggy artificial intelligence or other elements would be removed rather than fixed at this point because of time constraints. Bungie released the complete list of achievements for the game on July 30, including their titles, symbols, and requirements, and completed Reach between the end of July and beginning of August 2010.

=== Design ===
After Halo 3, development studio Bungie created an internal team to work on Peter Jackson's planned Halo game, Halo Chronicles. The game was eventually canceled and the team began working on a standalone expansion project—Halo 3: ODST—while another team, led by creative director Marcus Lehto and design lead Christian Allen, worked on Reach. The team considered many different concepts and approaches to the game; among the rejected ideas was a sequel to Halo 3. The team eventually settled on a prequel to the first Halo game in brainstorming sessions. It would take place on the planet Reach, during a pivotal time in the war. "Reach, as a fictional planet, was just a great candidate [to] play around with. It's such a rich world, with such a great fiction surrounding it," said Lehto. "We were like: 'Okay, that's it. We've just got a lot of things we can do there so we can build an immense story with it.'" No longer burdened with continuing the story threads of the Halo trilogy, Bungie used Reach to introduce new characters and settings. As Reach ends with the destruction of the titular planet, Bungie wanted to be sure players still felt a sense of accomplishment and success. "It is a challenge overall to ensure the player feels they're doing the right thing all the way to the end," said Lehto.

Lehto recalled that making a character-driven story was a great challenge—players would come to know more about them as they progressed through the campaign, but the Spartan characters also had to behave intelligently. The Halo games consistently featured protagonists that were silent during gameplay sequences. Community manager Brian Jarrard pushed for allowing players to choose a female Noble Six and have the cinematics and dialogue change accordingly. The post-credit game sequence was the subject of intense discussion; some at Bungie wanted to remove it. Executive producer Joe Tung noted, "the 'survive' component ... felt great to us. We definitely talked about different versions of how that was happening and different versions of ending [the game] cinematically, but I think the way that it ultimately ended up is just a really well-paced, significant and emotionally impactful ending."

The developers originally intended to port existing Halo 3 assets to Reach and update them. For Halo 3, Bungie had been forced to shrink parts of the game to fit the game engine's constraints, but wanted to make Reach look better than its predecessors. "The more we started looking into this, the more we found that realistically we could rebuild each asset from scratch with a huge increase in quality without significantly investing more time," said Bungie 3D artist Scott Shepherd. Texture resolution and polygon counts for models increased; the Reach assault rifle is constructed of more polygons than an entire Marine character from Halo 3. The prequel concept also gave the art team an opportunity to redesign key enemies, weapons, and elements of the series. Artists found inspiration in the original concept art for Halo: Combat Evolved; the shape for the redesigned Covenant Grunts came from a sketch that concept artist Shi Kai Wang created ten years earlier.

The developers redesigned the game engine, the software that handles rendering and much of gameplay. Bungie hired an expert in motion capture to develop more realistic character animations. Building a motion capture studio in-house saved Bungie time as motion capture data could be applied to the game models the same day it was shot. The developers sought to increase replay value by focusing on improving artificial intelligence. Rather than scripting enemy encounters, they focused on a more open world or sandbox approach to battles.

=== Audio ===
Martin O'Donnell scored Reach with additional music by Michael Salvatori. O'Donnell wrote "somber, more visceral" music since the plot is character-driven and focuses on a planet that is already known—in the Halo fictional universe—to have fallen. The first music he wrote for Reach was played for the game's world premiere, and he used it as a starting piece to develop further themes. O'Donnell began work on Reach while ODST, for which he also wrote the music, was still in production, but did not begin composing until August 2009. Past Halo collaborators Salvatori, C. Paul Johnson, and Stan LePard assisted O'Donnell. Both Reach and ODST don't have the Gregorian chant. With Reach, he did not give them strictly divided responsibilities. "I decided this time to come up with some themes, tempos, keys, and other basic starting points for musical ideas," explained O'Donnell. "I shared these with all the other composers and just asked them to take off if they felt inspired by any of that material." The works-in-progress they came up with were either retouched by O'Donnell or sent back to be finished by their composer.

In previous Halo titles, sections of music overlap and change depending on player action. Reach's system of interactive audio was much more complex, featuring the ability to combine up to seven layers of instrumentation compared to Combat Evolved's two. The developers also expanded the sound effect system. Every interacting object in Reach produces two sounds for respective objects; for example, a Warthog vehicle that hits an armored Covenant soldier produces a crunching metal noise based on the two colliding elements. The interaction between objects and terrain was demonstrated in an in-game environment that O'Donnell called "the stripey room" after the bands of alternating colors on the objects and environment.

=== Multiplayer beta ===
Reach's multiplayer beta was open to owners of Halo 3: ODST. More than three million copies of ODST were sold by November 2009. Bungie estimated between two and three million players for the upcoming Reach beta, compared to the 800,000 that participated in Halo 3's trial. Development schedules forced Bungie to release a six-week-old beta, fraught with bugs and issues already addressed in newer builds. Though concerned that these issues might tarnish the game's image, Jarrard noted that they had little choice but to ship it as it was and communicate with players concerning the fixes.

More than 2.7 million players participated in the beta, which lasted from May 3 to 20. The game was rolled out from an internal group of Bungie and Microsoft employees, with the total number of players in the thousands. When the beta went public, more than a million played the first day, causing back-end servers to struggle to handle the traffic. While the engineering team had overestimated server load, bugs in server clusters caused game uploads to become backed up, slowing matchmaking until the underlying issues could be fixed. Jarrard noted that the 16 million total hours of play time and large-scale rollout of the beta was vital to seeing how Reach would perform.

Bungie used the beta to fix mistakes, glitches, and balance issues within gameplay elements. "We needed our fans to provide feedback," said Lehto, adding that having a large audience to "hammer" on the game allowed them to gather useful feedback to mold the finished product. The game automatically collected statistics such as upload and matchmaking speeds, as well as game preferences; sorting out what Jarrard called "the more subjective anecdotal feedback" from emails, notes, and forums proved more difficult. The Reach beta generated over 360,000 forum posts on Bungie's community forums. Bungie created official threads for groups of issues to manage the high volume of feedback; "We tried to give people a little bit more of a direct avenue to give that feedback and to make our lives easier. It was definitely a lot to assess and digest," said Jarrard. Certain feedback from the players did not correlate with the statistical data obtained from the matches during the beta. Chris Carney, the lead designer for the multiplayer mode, recalled vocal dissatisfaction with the pistol early in the beta; by the end of the beta, the weapon was responsible for most of the kills coming from newly included weapons in the game. Bungie deployed special test matches to eliminate lurking variables, balance gameplay, and make other informed changes.

== Release ==
Reach was released on September 14, 2010 in 25 countries. Tens of thousands of stores signed up for midnight launch events; sponsored events took place in London, Oslo, Stockholm, and New York. Three editions were sold. The standard edition consisted of the game and its manual. The limited edition featured an artifact bag with story information, different packaging, and an exclusive set of in-game Elite armor. The "legendary edition" contained all the materials from the limited edition, a different packaging, two hours of developer commentary on the game's cutscenes, an in-game Spartan armor effect, and a 10-pound (4.5 kg) statue created by McFarlane Toys. North American players who purchased a first run copy of the game (in-store near launch day or pre-ordered) received an in-game Spartan "recon" helmet customization; players in other regions could earn it only by pre-ordering. Reach also came bundled with a limited edition Xbox 360 S that sports Halo-themed sounds and finish and two wireless Xbox 360 controllers.

Microsoft later listed Reach as an Xbox Live Marketplace download on August 12, 2010, at a price of 99999 Microsoft Points (~US$1250). A spokesperson confirmed the download was for media review purposes, and that there were no plans to distribute the game to the public through Games on Demand. Four days later, hackers managed to access, download, and distribute the game online; Microsoft stated they were investigating the matter. Halo 2, Halo 3, and ODST were similarly leaked ahead of their planned release. Bungie released a demo on May 24, 2011, featuring a single player level from the game's story mode, a multiplayer competitive map, and a cooperative firefight mission.

Halo: Reach was released for Windows and Xbox One as part of Halo: The Master Chief Collection on December 3, 2019.

=== Marketing ===
According to Jarrard, the team decided to have much more "grandiose" marketing for Reach than that of ODST. Microsoft gave Reach its largest game marketing budget at the time, surpassing the scale and $6.5 million cost of Halo 3's award-winning marketing. Marketers focused their efforts on connecting with consumers via universal themes, rather than outdoing Halo 3's push. Interpublic Group of Companies' AgencyTwoFifteen handled strategy and video development for the marketing push, while AKQA developed interactive components. The agencies were involved with Halo 3's marketing. The advertisers' brief was simple: "Remember Reach. Focus on the heroes, not the victims. Expand our audience beyond Halo fanboys."

The advertising campaign commenced in April 2010 with the live-action short "Birth of a Spartan". A series of online videos highlighting a day in the life of average Reach citizens before the Covenant invade, began on August 23, followed by TV spots on August 29. The series concluded in late August with another short, "Deliver Hope". As part of the promotions, Microsoft created an interactive light sculpture; users logged onto a website where they could direct a KUKA industrial robot to plot pinpricks of light; over 54,000 points created a monument to Noble Team that faded unless more points were plotted. Reach's marketing won several industry distinctions, among them thirteen medals from the MI6 Game Marketing Conference Awards.

Several lines of tie-in merchandise were launched. McFarlane, who had produced toys for Halo 3, created a line of five-inch action figures, while Square Enix's Play Arts toy label created additional figures.

=== Sales ===
Reach made $200 million in first-day sales, a record for the franchise. Its strong sales suggested to analysts that core titles in the holiday season could reverse sluggish video game sales in 2010. In its first sixteen days the game sold $350 million worth of merchandise. Reach premiered at the top of Xbox 360 and multi-platform charts in most territories. Figures from the NPD Group estimated that Reach sold 3.3 million units in North America, making it the third game for its console generation (Xbox 360, PS3, Wii) to sell more than three million units during the first month of its release (alongside Halo 3 and Modern Warfare 2). Halo: Reach became the third bestselling game of 2010 in North America, behind Call of Duty: Black Ops and Madden NFL 11. It sold 4.7 million units by September 2011.

In the United Kingdom, Reach's opening week was the fifth-best launch in the territory, beating Halo 3's debut by 20,000 units and ODST's by 200,000 units. In its second week on the UK charts Reach was the second bestselling title, displaced by the racing game F1 2010. Reach continued to hold the top place in North America. In Japan, the game debuted at first place with 44,413 units, but fared poorly in the long-term (as have other Halo games). This showing was above ODST's sales of 29,734 in the comparable timeframe, but below Halo 3's 61,143. Reach dropped out of the top 20 best selling titles entirely its second week.

=== Downloadable content ===
Reach supports additional downloadable content (DLC). Bungie released the game's first DLC, dubbed the "Noble Map Pack", on November 30, 2010; this map pack contains three maps, unique in that they are not based on Reach campaign levels. Microsoft partnered with Certain Affinity, which had worked on Halo 2 maps, to produce the second, "Defiant Map Pack", made available for download on March 15, 2011.

A "title update" was released by 343 Industries for Reach that modified game mechanics such as bullet spread and melee damage. The update also contained playlists for Halo: Combat Evolved Anniversary. Purchasers of anniversary edition received a voucher to download the game's seven multiplayer maps directly into Reach, the map pack was also made available to purchase via the Xbox Live Marketplace.

== Reception ==
Reception

Aggregate score
Aggregator	Score
Metacritic	91/100

Review scores
Publication	Score
1Up.com	A+
Computer and Video Games	9.2/10
Edge	9/10
Eurogamer	9/10
Famitsu	34/40
Game Informer	9.5/10
GamePro	5/5
GameRevolution	A
GameSpot	9.5/10
GamesRadar+	8/10
GameTrailers	9.3/10
IGN	9.5/10 (US); 10/10 (UK)
Official Xbox Magazine (UK)	10.0/10
Official Xbox Magazine (US)	9.5/10
X-Play	5/5
The Guardian	5/5
The Daily Telegraph	10/10

Halo: Reach received critical acclaim upon its release. On aggregating review website Metacritic, it holds an average of 91/100. Critics such as 1UP.com's Thierry Nguyen, the staff of Edge, GamePro's Matt Cabral, and others considered Reach the best Halo title yet. Reviewers noted there were few major changes to the Halo formula; IGN's Erik Brudvig wrote that Reach was not "another rehash", though franchise veterans would feel immediately at home with the game.

Nguyen, Tom Hoggins of The Daily Telegraph, and others wrote that Reach took the best elements from previous games and combined them in Bungie's final entry. Hoggins noted that this approach made Reach "a blistering, breathless crescendo to a decade's worth of work", but also that it was unlikely to convert non-Halo fans. The Daily Mirror's Kevin Lynch praised Bungie for introducing new gameplay mechanics like jetpacks without ruining the title's learning curve or game balance.

Brudvig praised the campaign for avoiding the "repetitive landscapes and circuitous, difficult to follow plots" of past Halo titles. GameSpot's Chris Watters and others felt the artificial intelligence of friendly non-player characters was less advanced than that of enemies, especially while driving. Steve Boxer wrote for The Guardian that Reach's story made previous entries feel "amateurish"; Nguyen felt that whereas previous Halo titles had become mired in inconsistencies and Star Trek-like technobabble, Reach told a broader and more accessible story. Despite this, he contended, the game suffered from archetypal characters with which players spent little time: "I almost forgot that Noble Four (Emile) even existed for a big chunk of the campaign, as I rarely saw him." Wired's Gus Mastrapa unfavorably compared Noble Team to the marines of Aliens, writing that most of the characters were unmemorable and one-dimensional. Nguyen also faulted the game for occasional lapses in exposition, but summed these up as "minor quibbles" compared to the improvements. In contrast, GamesRadar's Charlie Baratt opined that Reach's campaign was better than ODST's, but lacked the "franchise-changing potential" it promised. Lynch judged that while Bungie still had not learned to create a perfect story, "[Reach] does expertly set up bombastic scene after scene".

Ben Kuchera of Ars Technica enjoyed the multiplayer component of Reach for its scope—"no matter how you play, you will find something to like." Reviewers lauded the many customization options available to players: Watters and Kuchera praised the concept of psych profiles to hone more agreeable teammate selections, but questioned its effectiveness; G4 considered Reach's Forge World more expansive and impressive than Halo 3's Forge offerings; and Lynch wrote that the sheer quantity of multiplayer options would give the game a long life cycle for players.

Critics considered the audio-visual components a marked advance over Halo 3 and ODST's. The New Zealand Herald's Troy Rawhiti-Forbes wrote that with the improved graphics and animation, "[Reach] looks just like a big-budget Hollywood project." Official Xbox Magazine acknowledged better graphics in other games, but praised Reach for "eye-catching beauty and breathless scope", noting that the inclusion of wildlife and civilians heightened the impression of a planet under siege. Martin Robinson of IGN UK appreciated O'Donnell's moody score and the redone sound effects, writing that the new weapons "feel like they're about to tear your hands off".

=== Accolades ===
Year	Date	Award	Presented by	Category	Result	Ref.
2010	December 6	GG Awards 2010	Good Game	Best Sound	Won	
2010	December 6	GG Awards 2010	Good Game	Game of the Year	Nominated	
2010	December 11	Spike Video Game Awards 2010	Spike	Best Multiplayer	Won	
2010	December 11	Spike Video Game Awards 2010	Spike	Best Shooter	Nominated	
2010	December 11	Spike Video Game Awards 2010	Spike	Best Original Score	Nominated	
2010	December 11	Spike Video Game Awards 2010	Spike	Best Xbox 360 Game	Nominated	
2010	December 11	Spike Video Game Awards 2010	Spike	Best Performance By A Human Male (Note: Award was for Nathan Fillion as Sergeant Edward Buck)	Nominated	
2010	December 11	Spike Video Game Awards 2010	Spike	Game of the Year	Nominated	
2010	December 22	Game of the Year 2010	GameSpy	Shooter Game of the Year	Won	
2011	January 5	Drunk Tank Awards 2010	Drunk Tank Podcast	Game of the Year	Won	
2011	February 1	9th Visual Effects Society Awards	Visual Effects Society	Outstanding Visual Effects in a Live Action Commercial	Won	
2011	February 1	9th Visual Effects Society Awards	Visual Effects Society	Outstanding Real-Time Visual Effects in a Video Game	Won	
2011	February 1	9th Visual Effects Society Awards	Visual Effects Society	Outstanding Animated Character in a Video Game (Note: Award was for the character of Kat)	Won	
2011	February 11	14th Annual Interactive Achievement Awards	Academy of Interactive Arts & Sciences	Action Game of the Year	Nominated	
2011	February 11	14th Annual Interactive Achievement Awards	Academy of Interactive Arts & Sciences	Outstanding Achievement in Online Gameplay	Nominated	
2011	March 1	NAVGTR Awards 2010	National Academy of Video Game Trade Reviewers	Control Precision	Nominated	
2011	March 1	NAVGTR Awards 2010	National Academy of Video Game Trade Reviewers	Original Dramatic Score, Franchise	Nominated	
2011	March 16	7th British Academy Games Awards	British Academy of Film and Television Arts	Best Action	Nominated	
2011	March 16	7th British Academy Games Awards	British Academy of Film and Television Arts	Technical Innovation	Nominated	
2011	March 16	7th British Academy Games Awards	British Academy of Film and Television Arts	Best Multiplayer	Nominated	
2011	March 16	7th British Academy Games Awards	British Academy of Film and Television Arts	GAME Award	Nominated	
