= List of Halo media =

Halo franchise logo

Halo is a military science fiction video game franchise created by Bungie and owned and published by Xbox Game Studios. Central to the Halo series are the three first-person shooter video games Halo: Combat Evolved, Halo 2 and Halo 3; novelizations, soundtracks, and other media are also available. The story of the series is about the Master Chief, a cybernetically enhanced human super-soldier and his artificial intelligence (AI) companion, Cortana, as the humans of a futuristic universe battle the Covenant, a theocratic alliance of alien races. The Halo series has inspired machinima productions, such as Red vs. Blue, and other fan fiction; however, this list only covers media produced or endorsed by series creator Bungie, or the intellectual property overseer Halo Studios.

The Halo video games have been highly successful and influential; the first game was labeled the killer application of Microsoft's Xbox and was credited with selling many consoles. Halo: Combat Evolved is also noted for its intuitive control scheme that has been used by many console first person shooters since. Halo 2 sold 2.4 million copies making US$125 million in the first 24 hours after its release beating the record for highest grossing entertainment release. Halo 3 grossed US$170 million on its first day, $45 million more than its predecessor. Halo 2 and Halo 3 are also the best selling titles of their respective consoles, the Xbox and the Xbox 360.

== Games ==
=== Mainline games ===
| Game | Release date | Platforms | Notes |
|---|---|---|---|
| Halo: Combat Evolved | November 15, 2001 | Xbox; Xbox 360; Microsoft Windows; Mac OS X | Significantly boosted sales of the Xbox and set first-person shooter standards; Ported to Mac OS X and Windows XP with minor additions on September 30, 2003 |
| Halo 2 | November 9, 2004 | Xbox; Microsoft Windows; Xbox One | Broke sales record for first-day sales, with US$125 million; Ported to Windows Vista on May 29, 2007 |
| Halo 3 | September 25, 2007 | Xbox; Microsoft Windows; Xbox One | Completed the story arc begun in the first game; Broke Halo 2's record for first-day sales record, with US$170 million, and broke record for first-week sales, with $300 million |
| Halo 4 | November 6, 2012 | Xbox; Microsoft Windows; Xbox One | Beginning of the new "Halo" trilogy.; First original Halo game by 343 Industries in place of Bungie. |
| Halo 5: Guardians | October 27, 2015 | Xbox One | Introduces new multiplayer mode "Warzone" |
| Halo Infinite | December 8, 2021 | Microsoft Windows; Xbox One; Xbox Series X/S | Multiplayer was released as free-to-play |

=== Other games ===
| Game | Release date | Platforms | Notes |
|---|---|---|---|
| Halo Wars | February 26, 2009 | Xbox 360; Microsoft Windows; Xbox One | Real-time strategy game released on the Xbox 360; Takes place 20 years prior to Halo: Combat Evolved during the initial encounters with the Covenant. |
| Halo 3: ODST | September 22, 2009 | Xbox 360; Microsoft Windows; Xbox One | Stand-alone expansion for Halo 3, takes place between Halo 2 and Halo 3; Does not feature the Master Chief as the main playable character but five Orbital Drop Shock Troopers instead; Originally known as Halo 3: Recon; Campaign on Disc 1, and all of Halo 3's Multiplayer on Disc 2. |
| Halo: Reach | September 14, 2010 | Xbox 360; Microsoft Windows; Xbox One | Second prequel to the Halo games.; Last Halo game developed by Bungie. |
| Halo: Combat Evolved Anniversary | November 15, 2011 | Xbox 360; Microsoft Windows; Xbox One | High Definition remake of the first game, Halo: Combat Evolved.; Remastered Campaign, 7 Multiplayer Map Remakes utilizing Halo: Reach. |
| Halo: Spartan Assault | July 18, 2013 | Microsoft Windows; Microsoft Windows Phone; Xbox 360; Xbox One; iOS | Mobile twin-stick shooter game; Originally exclusive to Windows 8 phones, tablets, and PCs. Later released on Xbox 360 and Xbox One.; Code-named Halo: Bootcamp prior to its announcement. |
| Halo: The Master Chief Collection | November 11, 2014 | Xbox One; Microsoft Windows | Compilation of remastered versions of Halo 1 Remake, Halo 2, Halo 3 & ODST, Halo 4 and Halo: Reach; The release also ships with access to the Halo 5: Guardians multiplayer beta. |
| Halo: Spartan Strike | April 16, 2015 | Microsoft Windows; Microsoft Windows Phone; iOS | Mobile twin-stick shooter game |
| Halo Wars 2 | February 21, 2017 | Microsoft Windows; Xbox One | Sequel to 2009's Halo Wars; Announced at GamesCom 2015 |
| Halo: Fireteam Raven | July 2018 | Arcade cabinet | Set in the timeframe of Halo: Combat Evolved; The game was initially released as an exclusive to Dave & Buster's in North America. |
| Halo: Campaign Evolved | July 28, 2026 | Microsoft Windows; Xbox Series X/S; PlayStation 5 | Remake of the story mode of Halo: Combat Evolved |

=== Related games ===
| Game | Release date | Media type |
|---|---|---|
Six cryptic emails supposedly sent by Cortana, although they are not canon
| I Love Bees | Mid 2004 | Alternate reality game |
Players were linked to a beekeeping website that appears to have been taken over by an artificial intelligence.; Game ended with invites to play Halo 2 before its release.
| Iris | June 11 – August 17, 2007 | Alternate reality game |
Five web servers containing various media files related to the Halo universe
| Halo ActionClix | September 18, 2007 | Collectible miniatures game |
A table-top miniatures game featuring figures and vehicles for the video games.
| Halo Interactive Strategy Game | Late 2008 | Modular board game |
Table-top strategy board game based on the gameplay of the Halo games.
| Halo Recruit | October 17, 2017 | Mixed reality |
Introduction to the world of Halo and some of its most iconic characters and weapons.; Players assume the role of an unnamed United Nations Space Command recruit, who is put through a virtual reality shooting simulation against Covenant remnant targets.
| Halo: Flashpoint | November 2024 | Tabletop miniatures game |
Halo: Flashpoint is a tactical tabletop miniatures game from UK publisher Mantic Games.

== Soundtracks ==
| Title | Release date | Length | Label |
|---|---|---|---|
| Halo Original Soundtrack | June 11, 2002 | 65:08 | Sumthing Else Music Works |
Awarded best Original Soundtrack by Rolling Stone
| Halo 2 Original Soundtrack: Volume One | November 9, 2004 | 69:20 | Sumthing Else Music Works |
Includes tracks from various artists including Incubus and Breaking Benjamin
| Halo 2 Original Soundtrack: Volume Two | April 25, 2006 | 68:48 | Sumthing Else Music Works |
Suite structure to reflect different levels of the game.
| Halo 3 Original Soundtrack | November 20, 2007 | 118:36 | Sumthing Else Music Works |
Tracks are arranged by time of appearance in the game
| Halo Trilogy – The Complete Original Soundtracks | December 2, 2008 | 321:58 | Sumthing Else Music Works |
All soundtracks from the Halo trilogy (excluding Halo 2 OST: Volume One) appear here as well as four tracks from Halo Wars
| Halo Wars Original Soundtrack | February 17, 2009 | 53:57 | Sumthing Else Music Works |
Music composed by Stephen Rippy; first Halo game to not be scored by Martin O'Donnell; elements of O'Donnell's score still appear
| Halo 3: ODST Original Soundtrack | September 22, 2009 | 114:50 | Sumthing Else Music Works |
Music composed by Bungie's audio director Martin O'Donnell and his colleague Michael Salvatori.
| Halo Legends: Original Soundtrack | February 9, 2010 | 57:04 | Sumthing Else Music Works |
Music composed by Tetsuya Takahashi and Yasuharu Takanashi.
| Halo: Reach Original Soundtrack | September 28, 2010 | 107:24 | Sumthing Else Music Works |
Last Halo soundtrack to be composed by Bungie's audio director Martin O'Donnell and his colleague Michael Salvatori.
| Halo: Combat Evolved Anniversary Original Soundtrack | November 15, 2011 | 83:43 | Sumthing Else Music Works |
Live orchestra recordings arranged by Paul Lipson, Lennie Moore, Tom Salta, and Brian Trifon
| Halo 4 Original Soundtrack | October 19, 2012 | 77:23 | 7Hz Productions Ltd |
Music composed by Neil Davidge
| Halo 4: Forward Unto Dawn Original Soundtrack | July 10, 2013 | 58:02 | 343 Industries |
Music composed by Nathan Lanier
| Halo: Spartan Assault Original Soundtrack | July 18, 2013 | 49:17 | Microsoft Studios Music |
Music composed by Tom Salta.
| Halo 4: Original Soundtrack, Vol. 2 | January 1, 2014 | 81:26 | 7 Hz Productions |
Music composed by Neil Davidge & Kazuma Jinnouchi.
| Halo 2 Anniversary Original Soundtrack | November 10, 2014 | 87:04 | Microsoft Studios Music |
Music arranged by Paul Lipson, Lennie Moore, Tom Salta, Brian Trifon, Brian Lee White.
| Halo: Spartan Strike Original Soundtrack | April 16, 2015 | 67:34 | Microsoft Studios Music |
Music composed by Tom Salta.
| Halo 5: Guardians Original Soundtrack | November 13, 2015 | 132:48 | Microsoft Studios Music |
Music composed by Kazuma Jinnouchi.
| Halo: The Fall of Reach Original Soundtrack | December 4, 2015 | 64:51 | Microsoft Studios Music |
Music composed by Tom Salta.
| Halo Infinite Original Soundtrack | December 8, 2021 | 146:06 | Skill Tree Records |
Music composed by Gareth Coker, Curtis Schweitzer, and Joel Corelitz.
| Halo Infinite Multiplayer: A New Generation Original Soundtrack | December 8, 2021 | 43:58 | Skill Tree Records |
Music composed by Alex Bhore, Eternal Time & Space, and Joel Corelitz.

== Printed media ==
=== Novels ===
| Title | Release date | ISBN | Media type |
|---|---|---|---|
| Halo: The Fall of Reach | October 30, 2001 | ISBN 0-345-45132-5 | Novelization |
Prequel to Halo: Combat Evolved, Reissued in 2010 and 2011 in a Definitive Edition; Publishers Weekly Bestseller
| Halo: The Flood | April 1, 2003 | ISBN 0-345-45921-0 | Novelization |
Novelization of Halo: Combat Evolved, Reissued in 2010; Publishers Weekly Bestseller
| Halo: First Strike | December 2, 2003 | ISBN 0-345-46781-7 | Novelization |
Story set between Halo: Combat Evolved and Halo 2, starting right after the events of Halo: The Flood and leading to the beginning of Halo 2, Reissued in 2010.; The New York Times bestseller.
| Halo: Ghosts of Onyx | October 31, 2006 | ISBN 0-7653-5470-5 | Novelization |
Side story of the SPARTAN-III Project and their training on the world of Onyx set around the same time as the end of Halo 2.; The New York Times international bestseller.
| Halo: Contact Harvest | October 30, 2007 | ISBN 0-7653-1569-6 | Novelization |
Story set around the first encounter between the Humans and the Covenant told from both sides' points-of-view.; The New York Times, Publishers Weekly, USA Today's bestseller.
| Halo: The Cole Protocol | November 25, 2008 | ISBN 978-0-7653-1570-0 | Novelization |
Follows the story of a group of Spartans, "Gray Team", too isolated to take part in the events of other publications; The New York Times, Publishers Weekly, USA Today's best seller (trade paperback)
| Halo: Evolutions – Essential Tales of the Halo Universe | November 24, 2009 | ISBN 978-0-7653-1573-1 | Collection of short stories |
A collection of short stories from the Halo Universe which includes original material by Eric Nylund, Tobias S. Buckell, Karen Traviss and contributions from 343 Industries.
| Halo: Cryptum | January 4, 2011 | ISBN 978-0-7653-2396-5 | Novelization |
Authored by science fiction author Greg Bear.; Set in the universe of the Forerunners, 100,000 years before the events of the Halo story.; The first book of The Forerunner Trilogy.
| Halo: Glasslands | October 25, 2011 | ISBN 978-0-7653-3040-6 | Novelization |
The first Karen Traviss Halo novel.; The first of a Post-Halo 3 'Kilo-Five Trilogy' centered on the Office of Naval Intelligence and some ODSTs.
| Halo: Primordium | January 3, 2012 | ISBN 978-0-7653-2397-2 | Novelization |
Authored by science fiction author Greg Bear.; Set in the universe of the Forerunners, 100,000 years before the events of the Halo story.; The second novel of The Forerunner Trilogy.
| Halo: The Thursday War | October 2, 2012 | ISBN 978-0-7653-3363-6 | Novelization |
Second novel in the Kilo-Five Trilogy by Karen Traviss.
| Halo: Silentium | March 19, 2013 | ISBN 978-0-7653-2398-9 | Novelization |
Authored by science fiction author Greg Bear.; Set in the universe of the Forerunners, 100,000 years before the events of the Halo story.; The third and final novel of The Forerunner Trilogy.
| Halo: Mortal Dictata | January 21, 2014 | ISBN 978-07653-3545-6 | Novelization |
Final novel in the Kilo-Five Trilogy by Karen Traviss.
| Halo: Broken Circle | November 4, 2014 | ISBN 978-14767-8359-8 | Novelization |
Novel that covers some of the Prophet & Elite War, just under 900 years before the Halo event. By John Shirley
| Halo: New Blood | March 2, 2015 | ISBN 978-1-4767-9670-3 | Novelization |
Digital-first short novel. By Matt Forbeck.
| Halo: Hunters in the Dark | June 16, 2015 | ISBN 978-1-4767-9585-0 | Novelization |
Set in 2555, more than two years after the Master Chief went missing-in-action. Humans and Elites must attempt to overcome their differences as they embark on a covert mission back to the Ark. By Peter David.
| Halo: Saint's Testimony | July 27, 2015 | ISBN 978-1-5011-0969-0 | Novelization |
A digital single; A military-grade artificial intelligence successfully launches an unprecedented legal appeal against her own death sentence; By Frank O'Connor, Franchise Development Director for the Halo franchise at 343 Industries
| Halo: Last Light | September 15, 2015 | ISBN 978-1-5011-0336-0 | Novelization |
It is 2553, and the three-decade-long Covenant War that defined a generation has suddenly drawn to a close. Yet, in the remotest parts of human space, tensions remain that threaten to overflow into another full-scale conflict. Beneath the surface of the planet Gao lies a vast cavern system renowned for its therapeutic effects and rumored miraculous cures. But now Gao natives are turning up brutally murdered down there—violent acts that happen to coincide with the recent arrival of a UNSC research battalion protected by Spartan Blue Team, led by the renowned Spartan-II Fred-104.; Print versions of the book from certain retailers contained a code that could be redeemed for a REQ Pack in Halo 5: Guardians, set to be released just over a month from the book's release date.; By Troy Denning
| Halo: Shadow of Intent | December 7, 2015 | ISBN 978-1-5011-2276-7 | Novelization |
A digital-first e-novella.; A powerful threat has set a cataclysmic plan in motion—a plan to lure the Half-Jaw [Rtas ‘Vadum] into a trap that will herald the utter destruction of the entire Sangheili race.; By Joseph Staten
| Halo: Fractures | September 20, 2016 | ISBN 978-1-5011-4067-9 | Collection of short stories |
A collection of short stories from the following authors: Tobias S. Buckell, Troy Denning, Matt Forbeck, Kelly Gay, Christie Golden, Kevin Grace, Morgan Lockhart, John Jackson Miller, Frank O'Connor, Brian Reed, Joseph Staten, and James Swallow.; Includes the first printed versions of Shadow of Intent and Saint's Testimony, previously released as digital-first e-novellas in 2015
| Halo: Smoke and Shadow | November 28, 2016 | ISBN 978-1-5011-4460-8 | Novelization |
Digital-first eNovella; A continuation of the short story "Into the Fire" from "Halo: Fractures". The text from "Into the Fire" is also included in "Halo: Smoke and Shadow".; "Find. Claim. Profit. In a post-war galaxy littered with scrap, it's the salvager's motto. And with a fast ship and a lust for adventure, Rion Forge [daughter of Sergeant Forge from Halo Wars] has certainly made her mark on the trade. When the discovery of a wrecked UNSC cruiser brings Rion's past back to haunt her, stirring fresh hope into a decades-old wound, she's hell-bent on finding answers: What really happened to her father and his ship, the Spirit of Fire?"
| Halo: Envoy | April 25, 2017 | ISBN 978-1-5011-0687-3 | Novelization |
The novel marks the return of Spartan Gray Team and gives the background of what they have been up to since we last saw them.; "It has been six years since the end of the Covenant War...and yet on the planet Carrow, a world on the edge of the Joint Occupation Zone, a decisive new battle suddenly erupts."
| Halo: Retribution | August 29, 2017 | ISBN 978-1-5011-3836-2 | Novelization |
Members of a UNSC special operations team investigate the kidnapping of an admiral and her family, and are sucked into a conspiracy that threatens to undermine a fragile galactic peace.; The novel features characters from the Halo: Fractures short story "A Necessary Truth" and the novel Last Light.
| Halo: Legacy of Onyx | November 15, 2017 | ISBN 978-1-5011-3261-2 | Novelization |
The adoptive daughter of two scientists moves to a Forerunner installation, where she must grapple with living next to the aliens who once killed her people.; The novel features characters from the Halo: Fractures short story "Lessons Learned".
| Halo: Bad Blood | June 26, 2018 | ISBN 978-1-5011-2825-7 | Novelization |
Features Spartan Edward Buck and other characters from Halo 3: ODST.; The novel follows up on the novella New Blood, as well as the events of Halo 5.
| Halo: Silent Storm | September 4, 2018 | ISBN 978-1-5011-3838-6 | Novelization |
Takes place in 2526, early in the Human-Covenant conflict.
| Halo: Battle Born | January 1, 2019 | ISBN 978-1-338-25364-1 | Novelization |
First book in the Battle Born: A Halo Young Adult Novel Series; First Halo young adult fiction (YA) novel
| Halo: Renegades | February 19, 2019 | ISBN 978-1-5011-9279-1 | Novelization |
Follows up on the events of Halo: Smoke and Shadow and Halo: Primordium
| Halo: Oblivion | September 24, 2019 | ISBN 978-1-9821-1476-3 | Novelization |
Sequel to Halo: Silent Storm
| Halo: Meridian Divide | October 1, 2019 | ISBN 978-1-338-28099-9 | Novelization |
Sequel to Battle Born
| Halo: Shadows of Reach | September 22, 2020 | ISBN 978-1-982143-61-9 | Novelization |
Bridges the gap between Halo 5 and Halo Infinite; USA Today Bestseller
| Halo: Point of Light | March 2, 2021 | ISBN 978-1-982147-86-0 | Novelization |
Followup to Halo: Renegades.
| Halo: Divine Wind | October 19, 2021 | ISBN 978-1-80336-015-7 | Novelization |
Followup to Halo: Retribution
| Halo: The Rubicon Protocol | August 9, 2022 | ISBN 978-1-98214-788-4 | Novelization |
Expands on the campaign of Halo Infinite
| Halo: Outcasts | August 8, 2023 | ISBN 978-1-80336-750-7 | Novelization |
Follows characters Olympia Vale and Thel 'Vadam and their efforts to recover an artifact to stop Cortana.; Written by Troy Denning.
| Halo: Epitaph | February 27, 2024 | ISBN 978-1-80336-920-4 | Novelization |
Features the continuation of the Didact's story from Halo 4 and Halo: Escalation.; Written by Kelly Gay
| Halo: Empty Throne | December 10, 2024 | ISBN 978-1-6680-5212-9 | Novelization |
Set before Halo Infinite; Written by Jeremy Patenaude
| Halo: Edge of Dawn | December 16, 2025 | ISBN 978-1-6680-1755-5 | Novelization |
Continues the story of Halo Infinite; Written by Kelly Gay
| Halo: Waypoint Chronicles - Volume One | March 10, 2026 | ISBN 978-1-6682-1522-7 | Novelization |
Collection of short stories, some previously released on the Halo Waypoint website
| Halo: Parasite's Wake | October 20, 2026 | ISBN 978-1-6682-2684-1 | Novelization |
Takes place in 2552 and follows a group of military malcontents during the events of Halo: Combat Evolved.; Written by Tim Lebbon

=== Comic books ===
| Title | Release date | Media type |
|---|---|---|
| The Halo Graphic Novel | July 19, 2006 | Graphic novel |
Art from Lee Hammock, Jay Faerber, Tsutomu Nihei and Jean Giraud; Split into four stories: The Last Voyage of the Infinite Succor, Armor Testing, Breaking Quarantine, and Second Sunrise Over New Mombasa.
| Halo: Uprising | August 22, 2007 | Comic book series |
Four-part comic book series written by Brian Michael Bendis, and illustrated by Alex Maleev.; Story set between the end of Halo 2 and the beginning of Halo 3.
| Halo Wars: Genesis | March 3, 2009 | Supplemental graphic novel |
Art from Phil Noto, Graeme Devine and Eric Nylund.; Included in the Halo Wars: Limited Edition.; Story chronicling the first military campaign against the Covenant and a mission to discover why they are so interested in the world of Harvest.
| Halo: Helljumper | July 22, 2009 | Comic book series |
Five-part comic book series written by Peter David, and illustrated by Eric Nguyen.; Story set before Halo: Combat Evolved, focusing on the Helljumpers or Orbital Drop Shock Troopers (ODSTs).
| Halo: Blood Line | December 23, 2009 | Comic book series |
Four-part comic book series written by Fred Van Lente, with art by Francis Portela.; Story set before Halo: Combat Evolved, following a Black Ops group of Spartans assigned to the Office of Naval Intelligence (ONI).; Originally known as Halo: Spartan Black.
| Halo: Fall of Reach | September 15, 2010 | Comic book series |
Comic book adaptation of Halo: The Fall of Reach written by Brian Reed, and illustrated by Felix Ruiz.; Split into three mini-series (Halo: Fall of Reach – Boot Camp, Halo: Fall of Reach – Covenant, and Halo: Fall of Reach – Invasion) with a total of 12 issues.
| Halo: Initiation | August 14, 2013 | Comic book series |
A three issue series written by Brian Reed and art by Marco Castiello.; The origin story of Sarah Palmer, a character introduced in Halo 4, following her from her time as an Orbital Drop Shock Trooper (ODST) to a commander of the SPARTAN-IV Program.
| Halo: Escalation | December 11, 2013 | Comic book series |
Originally a twelve issue series written by Christopher Schlerf and art by Omar Francia.; Expanded with twelve additional issues by Duffy Boudreau (Blackacre), Sergio Ariño (Ms. Marvel), Ian Richardson (Noble Causes), and Douglas Franchin (Person of Interest).; Volume 1 (Issues 1–6): Taking place after the events of Halo 4, the UNSC Infinity is assigned escort duty for a diplomatic mission between the Arbiter and a Jiralhanae chieftain.; Volume 2 (Issues 7–12): The Fall of New Phoenix, Master Chief's return to action, and a dark plot by the Office of Naval Intelligence.; Volume 3 (Issues 13–18): Halo 4 Spartan Ops continues here as the UNSC Infinity battles the Covenant for control of the all-powerful Forerunner Janus Key. Plus, Spartan Tanaka's thrilling origin story revealed.; Volume 4 (Issues 19–24): An unexpected ally joins a crack team of Spartans for their most dangerous operation yet—a secret mission into the mysterious Forerunner site known as the Absolute Record.
| Halo: Tales from Slipspace | October 25, 2016 (Only Digital Pre-orders)/November 29, 2016 (All others) | Graphic novel |

=== Other books ===
| Title | Release date | Media type |
|---|---|---|
| The Art of Halo: Creating A Virtual World | November 9, 2004 | Art book |
Concept art, hi-res screenshots, wallpapers, and other information from the development of Halo: Combat Evolved and Halo 2
| Conversations from the Universe | November 9, 2004 | Supplemental booklet |
Included in the Halo 2 Limited Collector's Edition; Several in-universe messages to and from various characters
| Bestiarum | September 25, 2007 | Supplemental booklet/DVD |
Contains in-universe information about the various species of the Halo series; Released in printed and DVD format
| The Art of Halo 3 | November 25, 2008 | Art book |
Concept art, commentary, and other information from the development of Halo 3
| Halo Encyclopedia | October 19, 2009 | Guidebook |
A comprehensive guide to the Halo Universe.
| Dr. Halsey's Personal Journal | September 14, 2010 | Supplemental booklet |
Included in the Halo: Reach Limited Edition and the Halo: Reach Legendary Edition; A journal detailing Halsey's involvement with Spartan-IIs, Cortana, Keyes, Noble Team and more; Includes additional in-universe items such as Spartan-II patch, ID Card, News Snippets, Photos, etc.
| Halo: The Essential Visual Guide | July 4, 2011 | Guidebook |
An all-encompassing essential visual guide to the Halo universe.
| Halo: The Great Journey: The Art of Building Worlds | October 18, 2011 | Art book |
Art book celebrating the 10th anniversary of the franchise.
| Awakening: The Art of Halo 4 | November 6, 2012 | Art book |
Collection of and commentary on various art created specifically for Halo 4.
| Halo 4: The Essential Visual Guide | September 16, 2013 | Guidebook |
An all-encompassing essential visual guide to the world of Halo 4.
| Halo Mythos: A Guide to the Story of Halo | September 6, 2016 | Guidebook |
A comprehensive guide to the Halo Universe.
| Halo Warfleet | September 5, 2017 | Guidebook |
Technical guide to spacecraft in the Halo universe, including cross-sections of select ships from the franchise.
| Halo Encyclopedia | April 20, 2022 | Guidebook |
Updated encyclopedia

== Other media ==
| Title | Release date | Media type |
|---|---|---|
| Halo | – | Film |
A planned film adaptation of Halo: Combat Evolved ultimately postponed indefinitely.
| Halo Waypoint | November 5, 2009 | Application |
An evolving portal of content related to the Halo series. The application acts as a hub for Halo-related news, podcasts, art, video content, social network conversations, and user's Halo gaming careers.; Developed by 343 Industries in collaboration with Certain Affinity and originally released for the Xbox 360.; Released for Windows Phone 7 on November 8, 2010.; Released for Android and iOS on December 10, 2011.
| Halo Legends | February 16, 2010 | Series of anime shorts |
A series of seven animated short films created by five Japanese production houses: Bones, Casio Entertainment, Production I.G., Studio 4°C, and Toei Animation; Animated short films include Homecoming, Odd One Out, Origins, Prototype, The Babysitter, The Duel and The Package.
| Halo 4: Forward Unto Dawn | October 5, 2012 – November 2, 2012 | Web series |
A live-action web series released in the weeks leading up to the release of Halo 4.
| Halo: Nightfall | November 11, 2014 – December 9, 2014 | Web series |
A live-action web series released in the weeks following the release of Halo: The Master Chief Collection.
| Hunt the Truth | March 22, 2015 – October 26, 2015 | Podcast |
An episodic audio-drama released as a promotional marketing campaign for Halo 5: Guardians.
| Halo: The Fall of Reach (miniseries) | October 27, 2015 | Web series |
An animated web series following the events of Eric Nylund's book Halo: The Fall of Reach releasing alongside Halo 5: Guardians.
| Halo (TV series) | March 24, 2022 | Television series |
Television adaptation set in an alternate canon from the main series

== See also ==
- Xbox Game Studios
