= Michael Ostin =

American music industry executive and producer

- Born: Los Angeles, CA
- Education: University of Colorado; UCLA
- Occupations: Music industry executive; artist manager; producer; entrepreneur
- Board member of: UCLA School of Music; We Are Family Foundation; The Painted Turtle
- Father: Mo Ostin
- Website: michaelostin.com

Michael Ostin is an American music industry executive, producer, talent manager and entrepreneur.

== Early life ==
Michael Ostin was born in Los Angeles to Evelyn and Mo Ostin, the head of Warner Bros. Records. His father—one of the "most music conscious, music-centric chief executive of a record company in the rock and roll era"—brought home early demos and test pressings of albums by Arlo Guthrie, The Kinks, Frank Zappa and Jimi Hendrix, among others, and sought the opinions of his three sons and their friends, who often hung out at the Ostin's Encino home.

He took Michael and his brothers to concerts including the 1967 Beatles concert at the Hollywood Bowl, and Hendrix's 1969 concert at the Los Angeles Forum. Mo Ostin was also an art collector, and as a teenager Ostin accompanied him to galleries in New York and London.

== Career ==
=== Warner Bros. Records ===
After graduating from UCLA, Ostin was hired as a junior talent scout at Warner Bros. Records. His first signing was Christopher Cross, who he discovered while listening to unsolicited demos in 1978. Cross's self-titled debut album, released in 1979, included four hit singles, won 5 Grammy Awards, and sold more than five million albums in the US alone. In 1982, Cross won the Academy Award for Best Original Song for "Arthur's Theme (Best That You Can Do)", which he co-wrote with Burt Bacharach, Carole Bayer Sager, and Peter Allen for the film Arthur.

Ostin first worked with Madonna in 1983, when she released her self-titled debut. In 1984, after hiring Nile Rodgers to produce her second album, Ostin found its title track, "Like a Virgin". The song, which songwriters Billy Steinberg and Tom Kelly had unsuccessfully tried to place for more than a year, was Madonna's first #1 hit. Ostin also proposed the cover of Rose Royce's "Love Don't Live Here Anymore" which appeared on Like A Virgin, and found True Blue's "Papa Don't Preach," which became Madonna's fourth #1 single.

Mentored by Lenny Waronker, Ostin held A&R positions at Warner Bros. throughout his 19-year tenure at the company and ran the department as senior vice president of A&R from 1988 through 1996. In addition to Cross and Madonna, he was involved in signing and recording American Music Club, Eric Clapton, Filter, Fleetwood Mac, Green Day, Al Jarreau, Quincy Jones, Prince, Red Hot Chili Peppers, Seal, Paul Simon, Rod Stewart, Q-Tip and Neil Young, among other artists. He also produced and/or executive produced the soundtracks for Batman, National Lampoon's Vacation, Wayne's World and Wayne's World 2, Earth Girls Are Easy, Batman: Mask of the Phantasm, and Cool World.

=== DreamWorks Records ===
In December 1994, after a battle with the label's parent company, TimeWarner, Waronker and Mo and Michael Ostin resigned from Warner Bros. Records. Ten months later it was announced that they would found the recorded music division of DreamWorks SKG. Handpicked by the company's founders, Steven Spielberg, Jeffrey Katzenberg, and David Geffen, they were guaranteed complete autonomy. Ostin was named president of the newly formed label.

While building DreamWorks Records and DreamWorks Music Publishing, Ostin maintained a focus on A&R. In October 1995, Variety reported that DreamWorks had quickly become "the preeminent label for burgeoning talent", over the next five years signing artists, including Nelly Furtado, Eels, Elliott Smith, and Chris Rock. One of the label's most successful artists was Lifehouse, who Ostin signed and executive produced. Their 2000 single, "Hanging by a Moment", was on the Hot 100 for 56 consecutive weeks; their debut album, No Name Face, sold 2.3 million records. The Eels were the first new band to release a record on DreamWorks; Rufus Wainwright was the first artist signed.

Ostin executive produced and/or produced the soundtracks that accompanied films released by DreamWorks Films. He executive produced two "inspired by" versions of the Prince of Egypt soundtrack, The Prince of Egypt: Inspirational and The Prince of Egypt: Nashville, as well as the Prince of Egypt, which included the film's Hans Zimmer score, several theatrical songs by Stephen Schwartz, and the end credit theme, "When You Believe." The song, recorded by Mariah Carey and Whitney Houston, won an Oscar for Best Original Song in 1999 and was nominated for three Grammys in 2000. The Rent Broadway cast album was one of the label's first platinum records. He executive produced the American Beauty soundtrack with Sam Mendes, the film's director, and KCRW dj Chris Douridas, who Ostin had hired as an A&R rep. The album was nominated for Best Soundtrack at the 2001 Grammys, and Thomas Newman's score won Best Soundtrack Score. He also worked on several Saturday Night Live-related projects with Lorne Michaels, including the 25th SNL Anniversary CD and the 40th anniversary box set.

He was the executive producer for the Shrek and Shrek 2 soundtracks, both of which went multiplatinum and hit #1 on the Billboard soundtrack chart. "Accidentally in Love", which Adam Duritz of Counting Crows wrote for Shrek 2, was nominated for an Oscar, a Grammy, and a Golden Globe Award. Ostin was nominated for Best Compilation Soundtrack Album Grammy Awards for both Shrek and Shrek 2. In a 2021 article in The Ringer about the "massive musical footprint" of the films, Ben Lindberg wrote: "Shrek’s collection of music remains as beautiful and bold as it was 20 years ago. Only shooting stars break the mold, and Shrek’s soundtrack was one."

In addition to the soundtracks, and Lifehouse's debut, DreamWorks Records had multiplatinum success with Papa Roach, Furtado, and Toby Keith. Records by artists including Smith, Eels, Eitzel, and Wainright, among others, were critically acclaimed. In 2003, DreamWorks Records was acquired by Universal Music Group. Ostin stayed on to complete the projects he was working on at the time of the sale and in 2004 resigned to pursue entrepreneurial interests.

=== Production and management, Nile Rodgers, theater, philanthropy ===
After leaving DreamWorks, in addition to founding a management company, he independently produced compilations and new albums by Stewart, The Dream Academy, and Raphael Saadiq. In 2016, he A&R'd A Tribe Called Quest's sixth and final studio album, We Got It from Here... Thank You 4 Your Service. As of 2025, his management roster included A Tribe Called Quest, Tribe's MC and primary producer, Q-Tip, and D'Angelo.

Rodgers and Ostin reteamed to work on the soundtracks for the video game Halo, which Rodgers released through his distribution company, Sumthing Else; he was the music supervisor for the original Halo soundtrack as well as the soundtracks for Halo 2, and Halo 3. He also produced the Rodgers retrospective, Rarities, Oddities, and Exclusives, and partnered with Rodgers to form the independent label Land of the Good Groove.

Ostin invested in and produced the Tony award-winning musical The Book of Mormon and invested in the Broadway productions of Larry David's Fish in the Dark and Tina Fey's musical, Mean Girls. He was also involved in bringing Gregory Colbert's Ashes and Snow to Los Angeles.

Ostin is on the board of directors for We Are Family Foundation, a nonprofit focused on education and activism for young people founded by Rodgers and his life partner, Nancy Hunt; Painted Turtle, a camp experience for children with chronic and life-threatening illnesses founded by Paul Newman and the Dean's board of advisors at the UCLA School of Music. Through the Ostin Family Foundation, in addition to supporting the Evelyn and Mo Ostin Music Center, he established a scholarship fund at the music school. He is also an art collector, and has served on boards and various committees for the Hammer Museum, the Museum of Contemporary Art, and LAXART.

== Selected discography ==
Year	Album	Artist	Credit	Notes
2019	Rarities, Oddities, and Exclusives	Nile Rodgers	Producer	
2016	We Got It from Here... Thank You 4 Your Service	Tribe Called Quest	A&R	
2008	The Way I See It	Raphael Saadiq	A&R	
2008	Some Guys Have All the Luck	Rod Stewart	Executive producer	
2008	Halo 3	Various artists	Music supervisor	Soundtrack (video game)
2007	Halo 2	Martin O'Donnell	Music supervisor	Soundtrack (video game)
2006	Halo	Various artists	Music supervisor	Soundtrack (video game)
2005	Remembrance Days/A Different Kind of Weather	The Dream Academy	Vocals (background)	
2004	Shrek 2	Various artists	Executive producer	Grammy-nominated for Best compilation/ soundtrack album and Best song written for motion picture, television, or other visual media.
2003	Folklore	Nelly Furtado	A&R	
2003	My Soul	Maria	Executive producer	
2003	Floacism "Live"	Floetry	Executive producer	
2003	Encore: The Very Best of Rod Stewart, Vol. 2	Rod Stewart	Producer, executive producer	
2003	Biker Boyz	Various artists	Executive producer	Soundtrack
2002	The Amalgamut	Filter	Executive producer	
2002	Very Best of MTV Unplugged	Various artists	Producer, arranger	
2002	The Very Best of Christopher Cross	Christopher Cross	Assistant producer	
2002	Stanley Climbfall	Lifehouse	Executive producer, A&R	
2002	Baz Luhrmann's Production of Puccini's; La Bohéme on Broadway	Various artists	Album supervision	
2001	WWF Tough Enough	Various artists	Executive producer	
2001	Shrek	Various artists	Executive producer	Soundtrack
2001	"Hanging by a Moment"	Lifehouse	Executive producer	
2000	Whoa, Nelly!	Nelly Furtado	A&R	
2000	Somewhere in the Sun... Best of the Dream Academy	The Dream Academy	A&R, background vocals	
2000	Road Trip	Various artists	Producer	Soundtrack
2000	No Name Face	Lifehouse	Executive producer, A&R	
1999	American Beauty	Various artists	A&R	Soundtrack
1999	Saturday Night Live: 25 Years, Volumes 1 and 2	Various artists	Executive producer	
1999	Breakfast with Girls	Self	A&R	
1999	Forces of Nature	Various artists	Producer	Soundtrack
1999	Title of Record	Filter		
1998	The Prince of Egypt	Various artists	Executive producer	Soundtrack
1997	Steven Spielberg Presents Tiny Toons Sing!	Tiny Toons Sing	Executive producer	
1997	Leave Virginia Alone	Rod Stewart	Producer, executive producer	
1997	A Spanner in the Works	Rod Stewart	Producer, executive producer	
1996	Beautiful Freak	Eels	A&R	
1995	Insomniac	Green Day	A&R	
1995	Short Bus	Filter	A&R	
1995	Forever Blue	Chris Isaak	A&R	
1995	Getting Away with Murder	Patti Austin	A&R	
1994	Dookie	Green Day	A&R	
1994	Mo's Songs	Warner Bros. artist roster	Executive producer	
1994	Seal II	Seal	A&R	
1994	A Tribute to Curtis Mayfield	Various artists	Executive producer	
1994	Words + Music: Music from the Motion Picture; Bridges of Madison County	Various artists	Executive producer	
1994	With Honors	Various artists	Executive producer	Soundtrack
1994	San Francisco	American Music Club	A&R	
1994	Meanwhile	Third Matinee	Executive producer	
1993	San Francisco Days	Chris Isaak	A&R	
1993	"Soul to Squeeze"	Red Hot Chili Peppers	Executive producer, A&R	Coneheads soundtrack
1993	Wayne's World 2	Various artists	Executive producer	Soundtrack
1993	Unplugged....And Seated	Rod Stewart	Producer, Audio production, Executive producer	
1993	Stone Free: A Tribute to Jimi Hendrix	Various artists	Producer, Executive producer	
1993	Perfect World	Marty Robbins	Executive producer	
1993	Batman: Mask of the Phantasm	Shirley Walker	Executive producer	Soundtrack
1992	Automatic for the People	R.E.M.	A&R	
1992	Wayne's World	Various artists	Producer, executive producer	Soundtrack
1992	The Radical Light	Vonda Shepard	Executive producer	
1992	Start the Car	Jude Cole	Executive producer	
1992	Don't Tread	Damn Yankees	Executive producer	
1992	Cool World	Various artists	Executive producer	Soundtrack
1991	Diamonds and Pearls	Prince	A&R	
1991	Seal	Seal	Executive producer	
1991	Every Home Should Have One	Patti Austin	A&R	
1991	It's Your Life	Gardner Cole	Executive producer	
1990	The Rhythm of the Saints	Paul Simon	A&R	
1990	Toy Matinee	Toy Matinee	Cast	
1990	A View from 3rd Street	Jude Cole	Executive producer	
1989	Like A Prayer	Madonna	A&R	
1989	Batman	Prince	A&R	Soundtrack
1989	Storyteller – The Complete Anthology: 1964–1990	Rod Stewart	Executive Producer	
1989	Heart Shaped World (Chris Isaak album)	Chris Isaak	A&R	
1989	Back on the Block	Quincy Jones	A&R	
1989	Earth Girls Are Easy	Various artists	Executive producer	Soundtrack
1989	Atomic Playboys	Steve Stevens' Atomic Playboys	A&R	
1988	Traveling Wilburys Vol. 1	Traveling Wilburys	A&R	
1988	Triangles	Gardner Cole	Executive producer	
1988	Suspense	Anthony and the Camp	Executive producer	
1987	You Can Dance	Madonna	Executive producer, A&R	
1987	Tango in the Night	Fleetwood Mac	A&R	
1987	Sign o' the Times	Prince	A&R	
1987	Who's That Girl	Madonna	Coordination	Soundtrack
1987	Remembrance Days	The Dream Academy	Vocals (background), A&R	
1986	True Blue	Madonna	A&R	
1986	Graceland	Paul Simon	A&R	
1986	Chris Isaak	Chris Isaak	A&R	
1986	Tones	Eric Johnson	A&R	
1985	Gettin' Away with Murder	Patti Austin	Audio production, Executive producer	
1985	Anywhere You Go	David Pack	Executive producer	
1985	The Dream Academy	Dream Academy	A&R	
1985	Silvertone	Chris Isaak	A&R	
1985	Behind the Sun	Eric Clapton	A&R	
1984	Like a Virgin	Madonna	A&R	
1984	Which One of Us Is Me	Jay Gruska	Executive producer	
1983	Madonna	Madonna	A&R	
1983	National Lampoon's Vacation	Various artists	Producer	Soundtrack
1982	Long Time Friends	Alessi Brothers	Producer	
1981	Breakin' Away	Al Jarreau	A&R	
1981	Tonight I'm Yours	Rod Stewart	Producer	
1980	Code Blue	Code Blue	Engineer, remixing	
1980	Buy American	DB Cooper	Executive producer	
1979	Christopher Cross	Christopher Cross	Producer, Assistant producer	Five Grammy awards, including Song of the Year and Record of the Year
