= Blow Me Away =

Single by Breaking Benjamin

from the album Halo 2 Original Soundtrack, So Cold EP and Shallow Bay: The Best of Breaking Benjamin
- Released: November 3, 2004; February 23, 2010; June 7, 2011 (featuring Valora)
- Genre: Alternative metal; hard rock
- Length: 3:26; 3:09 (featuring Valora)
- Label: Hollywood
- Songwriters: Benjamin Burnley; Aaron Fink; Jeremy Hummel; Mark Klepaski
- Producer: David Bendeth

Breaking Benjamin singles chronology
"Lights Out" (2010)	"Blow Me Away" (2004)	"Failure" (2015)

2011 cover
- "Blow Me Away" (featuring Valora)

Music video
- "Blow Me Away" on YouTube

"Blow Me Away" is a song by American rock band Breaking Benjamin. The song is a non-album single, written in 2004 specifically for the Halo 2 Original Soundtrack and is featured in the video game Halo 2. It was later released in 2010 as a digital single. In 2011, a remixed version of the song was released on Shallow Bay: The Best of Breaking Benjamin, featuring vocals of Sydnee Duran from Valora. The single was certified platinum by the Recording Industry Association of America (RIAA) on January 21, 2021.

== Composition ==
Written by vocalist and guitarist Benjamin Burnley and then-drummer Jeremy Hummel, the song is described as featuring "hard rock roots, ... a vocal-centric aesthetic, heavy electric rhythm guitars", and "an aggressive male vocalist". The opening of the song contains a characteristic deep tenor-style choir and bell chime inspired by the Halo Original Soundtrack.

== Appearances in Halo 2 ==
Burnley described himself as a huge gamer, and "Blow Me Away" was written specifically for the Halo 2 Original Soundtrack for the band's publicity. Featured on Volume 1 of the soundtrack, the song notably became the fan favorite standout single over fellow featured band tracks "Follow" by Incubus and "Connected" by Hoobastank.

Within the video game Halo 2, the track plays during the end of the twelfth level Gravemind, as the player is controlling Master Chief fighting between the Covenant civil war in the Mausoleum of the Arbiter, though the song plays an instrumental version with the lyrics muted. The introduction of the song, with its characteristic bell chime, can be heard during the fourth level Outskirts apart of the unreleased track "Broken Gates" by Martin O'Donnell, and later its 2014 remastered version "Moon over Mombasa" apart of the Halo 2: Anniversary Original Soundtrack.

== Band controversies ==
In 2004, drummer Jeremy Hummel filed a federal wrongful termination lawsuit against the band, which he contended that he co-wrote the song.

In March 2010, it was announced that Hollywood Records was seeking the band's permission to produce the remix with additional vocals from Sydnee Duran of Valora for their upcoming greatest hits album Shallow Bay: The Best of Breaking Benjamin. In May 2011, while the band was on hiatus due to Burnley's health issues, guitarist Aaron Fink and bassist Mark Klepaski gave the label permission to remix the song after being offered money. Burnley fired both two days later. In June, Burnley filed a lawsuit against Fink and Klepaski, seeking at least $750,000 in damages and the exclusive right to the band's name. He claimed that both members had made unilateral and unauthorized decisions on behalf of the band, though both of them denied these claims. On April 19, 2013, Burnley announced that the dispute between him and the other members had been resolved and that he retained the right to continue the band under the name Breaking Benjamin.

== Track listing ==
"Blow Me Away"
No.	Title	Writer(s)	Length
1.	"Blow Me Away"	Benjamin Burnley; Aaron Fink; Jeremy Hummel; Mark Klepaski	3:26

"Blow Me Away" (featuring Valora)
No.	Title	Writer(s)	Length
1.	"Blow Me Away (featuring Valora)"	Benjamin Burnley; Aaron Fink; Jeremy Hummel; Mark Klepaski	3:09

"Blow Me Away" (featuring Valora) – single
No.	Title	Writer(s)	Length
1.	"Blow Me Away (featuring Valora)"	Benjamin Burnley; Aaron Fink; Jeremy Hummel; Mark Klepaski	3:27

== Charts ==
Year	Single	Peak chart positions					Album
Year	Single	US BU	US Alt.	US Digital	US Main.	US Rock	Album
2010	"Blow Me Away"	1	—	64	—	—	Single-only release
2011	"Blow Me Away" (remix featuring Valora)	20	37	—	5	14	Shallow Bay: The Best of Breaking Benjamin
"—" denotes a release that did not chart.

== Certifications ==
Region	Certification	Certified units/sales
United States (RIAA)	Platinum	1,000,000^{‡}
^{‡} Sales+streaming figures based on certification alone.

== Personnel ==
"Blow Me Away"

- Performed by Breaking Benjamin
  - Benjamin Burnley – vocals, rhythm guitar
  - Aaron Fink – lead guitar
  - Mark Klepaski – bass
  - Jeremy Hummel – drums
- Written by Benjamin Burnley and Jeremy Hummel
- Produced and mixed by David Bendeth
- Digital editing by Dan Korneff
- Recorded at Blackbird Studios, Nashville, Tennessee

"Blow Me Away" (featuring Valora)

- Written by Benjamin Burnley and Jeremy Hummel
- Produced and mixed by David Bendeth
- Mix engineering by Dan Korneff
- Engineering and digital editing by Dan Korneff and John Bender
- Recorded at House of Loud, Elmwood Park, New Jersey
- Mastered by Ted Jensen at Sterling Sound, New York City, New York
- Additional vocals by Sydnee Duran of Valora
