= Guilty Party =

(The) Guilty Party or Guilty Parties may also refer to:

- Guilty party, someone who is responsible for committing an offense in law.

== Film and television ==
- The Guilty Party, a 1912 short film directed by Oscar Apfel
- The Guilty Party, a 1917 short film by Thomas R. Mills based on the O. Henry short story
- "The Guilty Party", episode 37 of the 1953 4th season of the TV series BBC Sunday-Night Theatre
- Guilty Party (1956 TV series), a BBC miniseries written by Edward J. Mason and Tony Shryane
- "The Guilty Party", episode 10 of the 1957 1st season of the TV series The O. Henry Playhouse, adapted from the O. Henry short story
- "The Guilty Party", episode 19 of the 1960 6th season of the TV series Dixon of Dock Green
- "The Guilty Party", an episode of the 1963 TV series The Scales of Justice
- "The Guilty Party", episode 27 of the 1964 9th season of the TV series ITV Play of the Week
- "Guilty Party", 18th episode of the 1987 second season of the TV series The Colbys
- "The Guilty Party", episode 6 of the 1990 4th season of the TV series Thirtysomething
- "The Guilty Party", episode 18 of the 1992 3rd season of the TV series Dream On
- "Guilty Party", the two-part 23rd and 24th episodes of the 1993 2nd season of the TV series A Country Practice
- "The Guilty Party", episode 12 of the 2003 2nd season of the TV series Cyberchase
- "Guilty Party", 114th episode of 2009 11th season of the TV series Doctors
- Guilty Party (TV series), on Paramount+

== Other uses ==
- Guilty Party (video game), 2010
- "'The Guilty Party'", a short story by O. Henry, first published in The Trimmed Lamp (1907)
- Guilty Party, 1997 EP by the band Out Hud
- The Guilty Party, Roger Glover's band from 2002
