= Oni (video game) =

2001 video game

- Developer: Bungie West (Note: Ported to PlayStation 2 by Rockstar Canada; Mac version later ported from Carbon to Cocoa by The Omni Group for increased OS X compatibility, and from PowerPC to x86 by Feral Interactive.)
- Publishers: Gathering of Developers; Rockstar Games (PS2 and PC)
- Director: Michael Evans
- Producer: Hamilton Chu
- Designer: Hardy LeBel
- Composers: Martin O'Donnell; Michael Salvatori; Paul Sebastien; Brian Salter
- Platforms: Microsoft Windows, Mac OS, PlayStation 2
- Release: Microsoft Windows: EU: 26 January 2001; NA: 29 January 2001; PlayStation 2: NA: 29 January 2001; EU: 9 March 2001; Mac OS: NA: 29 January 2001; EU: March 2001
- Genres: Action, beat 'em up, third-person shooter
- Mode: Single-player

Oni is a third-person action video game developed by Bungie West, a division of Bungie. It was originally released by Gathering of Developers for Microsoft Windows and Mac OS in 2001; a PlayStation 2 port developed by Rockstar Canada was released the same year. It was Bungie West's only game. Its gameplay consists of third-person shooting with hand-to-hand combat, with a focus on the latter. The game's style was largely inspired by the films Ghost in the Shell (1995) and Akira (1988) and shares the same genre, being set in a cyberpunk world.

== Gameplay ==
Konoko using a move effective on multiple enemies, the Devil Spin Kick

Oni is a third-person action game, focused on melee combat mixed with some gunplay. The player can punch, kick, and throw enemies; progressing into later levels unlocks stronger moves and combos. There are ten different guns in Oni, including handguns, rifles, rocket launchers, and energy weapons. Power-ups such as "hyposprays", which heal damage, and cloaking devices, which render the player invisible, can be found scattered throughout the levels or on corpses. Since the player can carry only one weapon at a time and ammunition is scarce, hand-to-hand combat is the most effective and common means of defeating enemies.

There are multiple classes of enemy, each with its own style of unarmed combat. Each class is subdivided into tiers of increasing strength. As in Bungie's earlier Marathon titles, tiers are color-coded, in this case by green (weakest), blue, and red (strongest). Also color-coded are the levels of health each opponent has, indicated by a flash when the player strikes or shoots them. Green flashes show the opponent has high health, red flashes show the enemy is near death.

Oni does not confine the player to fighting small groups of enemies in small arenas; each area is fully open to explore. The fourteen levels are of various sizes, some large enough to comprise an entire building. Bungie hired two architects to design the buildings.

The Oni engine implements a method of interpolation that tweens key frames, smoothing out the animation of complex martial-arts moves, but frame slippage is a common problem when multiple non-player characters near the player are attacking.

== Plot ==
The events of Oni take place in or after the year 2032. In the game, Earth is so polluted that little of it remains habitable. To solve international economic crises, all nations have combined into a single entity, the World Coalition Government. The government is totalitarian, telling the populace that what are actually dangerously toxic regions are wilderness preserves, and uses its police forces, the Technological Crimes Task Force (TCTF), to suppress opposition. The player character, code-named Konoko (voiced by Amanda Winn-Lee), begins the game working for the TCTF. Soon, she learns her employers have been keeping secrets about her past from her. She turns against them as she embarks on a quest of self-discovery. The player learns more about her family and origins while battling both the TCTF and its greatest enemy, the equally monolithic criminal organization called the Syndicate. In the game's climax, Konoko discovers a Syndicate plan to cause the Atmospheric Conversion Centers, air-treatment plants necessary to keep most of the world's population alive, to catastrophically malfunction. She is partially successful in thwarting the plot, saving a portion of humanity.

== Development ==
The game was developed by a core team of about twelve people. The game's universe is heavily influenced by Mamoru Oshii's anime film Ghost in the Shell, with some additional influence from Akira and the works of Kenichi Sonoda. The original plan was for Konoko to be a cyborg like Ghost in the Shell's Motoko Kusanagi. The explanation for her superhuman abilities was changed to be more organic with the addition of the Daodan Chrysalis concept by design lead Hardy LeBel.

Oni was originally expected to be released in the fourth quarter of 1999. Advertising was targeted towards that shipping date, and the game won E3's Game Critics Awards for Best Action/Adventure Game in 1999. However, development difficulties caused the release date to be pushed back continuously. The acquisition of Bungie by Microsoft in 2000 then led to the transfer of the Oni IP to Take-Two Interactive (which owned 20% of the studio prior to Microsoft's acquisition). Since Bungie's employees were moving to the new office location in Microsoft's headquarters or leaving the company, work on Oni had to be completed as quickly as possible. Due to a lack of time to resolve issues with the multiplayer code and to finish the levels intended for use by multiplayer mode, this functionality was omitted from the released version.

A sequel was in development at Angel Studios for two years before being cancelled due to a lack of progress and creative direction.

=== Music ===
Half of the music was composed by Martin O'Donnell in collaboration with Michael Salvatori. Other tracks in the game, which had already been implemented before O'Donnell and Salvatori joined the project, were composed by the music company Power of Seven, which specialized in electronic music genres such as techno and ambient. The Power of Seven team consisted of founder Paul Sebastien, as well as composer Brian Salter and Kim Cascone, who served as a sound designer for the game; the team had previously worked together at Thomas Dolby's audio technology company Headspace. O'Donnell, who served as the game's audio lead, decided to keep the tracks Power of Seven had already composed, while composing roughly the same amount of music himself. Select tracks from the game were made available on MP3.com in 2000, a year before the game was released. A soundtrack CD of the game's music was bundled with purchases of the game at Best Buy.

== Reception ==
Reception

Aggregate score
Aggregator	Score
Metacritic	(PC) 73/100 (PS2) 69/100

Review scores
Publication	Score
AllGame	2.5/5
Edge	7/10
Electronic Gaming Monthly	3.33/10
Eurogamer	7/10
Game Informer	6.5/10
GamePro	2/5
GameRevolution	B
GameSpot	(PS2) 7.1/10 (PC) 6.9/10
GameSpy	80%
GameZone	(PC) 9/10 (PS2) 8/10
Hyper	90/100 (PC)
IGN	(PC) 7.5/10 (PS2) 7.3/10
Next Generation	4/5
Official U.S. PlayStation Magazine	1.5/5
PC Gamer (US)	72%
The Cincinnati Enquirer	4/5
Playboy	75%

The game received "average" reviews on both platforms according to the review aggregation website Metacritic. Some reviewers were unimpressed by the minimal detail of the environment graphics, the lack of intelligence on the part of the AI in some situations, and the plot, which was occasionally criticized as underdeveloped. The game's difficulty in combination with a lack of savepoints was sometimes cited as a negative.

The absence of LAN-based multiplayer, which had been demoed at hands-on booths at Macworld Expos during Oni's development, but removed before release due to stated concerns over latency issues, contributed to some lower scores from reviewers.

On the positive side, Oni received the most praise for its smooth character animation and large array of fighting moves, as well as how it blended gunplay and melee combat. Thus, reviewers gave Oni mostly average-to-good scores in recognition of the enjoyment factor of the game. Jeff Lundgren of Next Generation said of the PlayStation 2 version: "It may have been a long time coming, but it was worth the wait. In fact, in a number of important ways, this is the game The Bouncer should have been."

In the United States, Oni sold 50,000 copies by October 2001.

== Anniversary Edition ==
The "Anniversary Edition" was made by fans and the community, based on years of research, as an enhancement mod for the retail version of Oni. The first official release was in 2008, seven years after Oni's release.
