= Septerra Core =

1999 video game

- Developer: Valkyrie Studios
- Publishers: Monolith Productions; TopWare Interactive
- Designer: Brian Babendererde
- Composers: Martin O'Donnell; Michael Salvatori
- Platforms: Windows, OS X, Linux
- Release: Windows: NA: November 8, 1999; UK: March 24, 2000; OS X: WW: October 15, 2013; Linux: WW: November 14, 2016
- Genre: Role-playing
- Mode: Single-player

Septerra Core: Legacy of the Creator is a role-playing video game developed by Valkyrie Studios and published by Monolith Productions. It was originally released in 1999 for Windows; since then, it has been re-released via GOG.com for Windows in 2009, for OS X in 2013, and for Linux in 2017.

== Gameplay ==
Battle sequence

The gameplay area has two different depths: the world map and the location maps, both using pre-rendered backdrops. The player is given the opportunity of interacting with other characters, visiting stores, fighting battles, and so forth, while the world map serves the purpose of transporting the player from one location map to the other. At some points in the story, such as the beginning, the game is linear on the world map; at other times the player can move to battlefields to gain more experience for the characters. Within dungeons there is a choice of movement to pick up the required magic items in any order, but one cannot rest to full health within. Each combat sequence is accompanied by a random battle-music track, during which the player characters and their opponents leap to their stations on an isometric grid. The player cannot alter their location during the game, not even if the villain directly in front of one is defeated. There is a "dial" for each of the three player characters, which moves past two break points, and ultimately to a maximum power level, as time goes along. After the first break point, the player may choose to have that player attack at a low level, or join with another character for a combined attack. Spells, either for a given character or combo, may be set up and cast at low, medium, or maximum power level as well. While the player chooses to wait until the characters are powered-up, the enemy attacks.

== Characters ==
=== Playable Characters ===
In total there are 9 playable characters to be unlocked. The player gets the choice to customize their roster of 3 characters at once. Certain characters have different interactions with different people, objects or scenery.

- Maya: The main protagonist of the game. She is a young woman from Shell 2, who scavenges useful items from the junk piles. As a girl, her village was destroyed and her parents killed when the Chosen, the inhabitants of the topmost Shell, decided to bring their airborne conflicts to her peaceful home town. You will start your adventure with Maya. She is the main character of the Septerra Core story; however, during the course of the game you will encounter a variety of characters who will join you in your quest to save Septerra from destruction.
- Grubb: He is Maya's friend. A reclusive mechanical wizard who can turn the bounty of junk on Shell 2 into just about any machine he can think of. Grubb has the ability to repair things, which can be used in combat to heal mechanical/cyborg allies.
- Runner: Grubb's oddest and best creations, an enormous and affable junk-bot that can walk on two legs or run on four. Runner seems like a massively overgrown puppy-dog at times, but he is a ferocious ally in combat. Runner has the ability to steal when browsing a shop.
- Corgan: A member of the courageous and dedicated Holy Guard, the protectors of Shell 3 and of the legacy of Marduk, Corgan is a skilled defensive sword fighter with a knack for diplomacy. Until a certain side mission is completed, Corgan does not completely trust Selina and there is a random of chance that Corgan will automatically use his turn during combat to attack Selina or vice versa, if they are paired on the same team.
- Led: The young daughter of a great military leader, General Campbell, Led is a skilled mechanic whose preferred Weapon is a giant wrench. She has two artificial legs which are the result of an accident during military training. Ever since then, her father has forbidden her to fight for her country. The only character other than Grubb who has the repair ability.
- Araym: A thief and bounty hunter, he can use his detachable, spider-like mechanical limbs for a variety of attacks. The only character other than Runner who has the steal ability when browsing a shop.
- Selina: One of Doskias’ generals and his lover, Selina is a dark, mysterious and powerful warrior with a knack for mystical Core Spells. Though in the start of the game Selina is an antagonist, as the game progresses, she has a change of heart and is unlocked as a playable character.
- Badu: A member of the inhuman race of the Underlost, the enormous Badu is a powerful warrior but a bad communicator — he only speaks his native tongue. This character has very few interactions with people outside of his homeland, but very useful when the player needs to communicate with other Underlost people who can only speak in their native tongue.
- Lobo: he was once a mindless cyborg created to defend his country from marauding pirates, but after crash landing during battle he was found and rebuilt by a renegade mechanic. After acquiring free thought, he became a pirate, to fight against the very country that made him. This characters attacks in combat are very similar to Maya, and they can share a lot of weapon accessories.

=== Non Playable Characters ===
There are a ton of non playable characters, or NPCs, that the player can interact with which have countless reactions to various playable characters which makes talking to the same NPC when playable characters are swapped always worth a try. Below some of the NPCs who are integral to the story are mentioned.

- Uncle: He is known simply as uncle because Maya, and many of the orphans in her hometown Oasis, were raised by this kindly man.
- Azziz: The orphans of Oasis are taught by Azziz, the wise master of the temple that celebrates the great Marduk. Azziz is a good source of information about the world of Septerra.
- Bowman: The leader of the Holy Guard. He has trained Corgan and other Holy Guard and is also the father of Layla.
- Layla: She is Corgan's one true love, and also another member of the Holy Guard. She is the daughter of Bowman who worries about her when going into battle.

== Development ==
Septerra Core was originally being developed by Rabid Entertainment. After Rabid Entertainment closed its doors, Valkyrie Studios took over and finished development. The game was released by Monolith Productions in November 1999 for the PC. The game was scored by Martin O'Donnell and Michael Salvatori, and featured minor voice work from Steve Downes.

According to IGN, "Many of the Valkyrie Studios team had previously worked on the Beavis & Butthead game for Viacom, a highly acclaimed graphic adventure."

== Release ==
In 2006, version 1.04 was released, addressing compatibility issues with the game and newer versions of Windows operating systems.

In 2009, the digital distributor GOG.com released a version of the game pre-patched to v1.04.

In 2013, the game was also released on Steam.

== Reception ==
Reception

Aggregate score
Aggregator	Score
Metacritic	72/100

Review scores
Publication	Score
AllGame	3.5/5
CNET Gamecenter	6/10
Computer Games Strategy Plus	3.5/5
Computer Gaming World	2/5
Eurogamer	4/10
GamePro	4/5
GameRevolution	A−
GameSpot	6.7/10
GameSpy	78%
IGN	8/10
Next Generation	4/5
PC Accelerator	5/10
PC Gamer (US)	86%
RPGFan	95/100

The game received "average" reviews according to the review aggregation website Metacritic. John Lee of NextGen said, "You don't see many console-style RPGs on PC, but Septerra Core should make you look."

Jason Lambert of GameZone gave it 8.1 out of 10, saying, "If you are wanting an exciting RPG while waiting on the other greats to hit the shelves, then you would want to pick Septerra Core."
