= Golem (2019 video game) =

- Developer: Highwire Games
- Publishers: Highwire Games, Perp Games
- Directors: Jaime Griesemer; Jared Noftle
- Artists: Vic Deleon; Travis Brady
- Composer: Martin O'Donnell
- Engine: Unreal Engine 4
- Platform: PlayStation 4
- Release: November 15, 2019
- Genre: Action-adventure
- Mode: Single-player

Golem is a video game developed by Highwire Games and published by Perp Games for the PlayStation 4 video game console, specifically for the PlayStation VR virtual reality headset. It was released on November 15, 2019.

== Development ==
Golem is the debut game from independent studio Highwire Games. Based in Seattle, the studio was founded in 2015 by former Bungie employees Martin O'Donnell and Jaime Griesemer, alongside Jared Noftle, co-founder of Airtight Games. Vic Deleon, another former Bungie employee, left 343 Industries to join the development team as world art director and Travis Brady of Valve joined as character art director.

Golem was developed for the PlayStation 4 and makes use of the PlayStation VR virtual reality headset. The game was developed using Unreal Engine 4. Highwire approached Epic Games' Seattle-based studio for assistance on developing the virtual reality game.

O'Donnell, who serves as the game's composer, launched a Kickstarter campaign to crowdfund a "musical prequel" to Golem, titled Echoes of the First Dreamer.

== Release ==
Golem was first announced in December 2015 at the PlayStation Experience. The game was scheduled to launch on 13 March 2018, but had since been delayed for further polishing. On 19 August, Highwire games confirmed a new Fall 2019 release window.

== Reception ==
The game received mixed reviews, according to review aggregator Metacritic, with an average of 59/100 based on 19 reviews.

Golem was nominated for "Outstanding Achievement in Original Music Composition" at the 23rd Annual D.I.C.E. Awards, and won the award for "Best Dialogue for an Indie Game" at the 2020 G.A.N.G. Awards, whereas its other nomination was for "Best Sound Design for an Indie Game".
