= Halo Original Soundtrack =

Soundtrack album by Martin O'Donnell, Michael Salvatori
- Released: June 11, 2002
- Genre: Video game soundtrack
- Length: 65:08
- Label: Sumthing Else Music Works
- Producers: Martin O'Donnell, Michael Salvatori

The Halo Original Soundtrack is a soundtrack for the video game Halo: Combat Evolved. Composed and produced by Martin O'Donnell and Michael Salvatori for Bungie, the soundtrack was released on June 11, 2002. Most of the music from Halo: Combat Evolved is present on the CD, although some songs have been remixed by O'Donnell in medley form for "more enjoyable" listening. The first piece O'Donnell wrote, known as "Halo", became the basis for Halo's "signature sound" which has been heard in the other games of the main trilogy.

The soundtrack features a wide range of musical styles, including chanting, string orchestra, and percussion. Upon release, the soundtrack was praised by critics, with the music being widely regarded among the greatest video game soundtracks ever made. Some complimented the wide range of musical styles, and most agreed that playing the game is not required to enjoy the soundtrack. A special edition of the soundtrack was released on October 28, 2003, featuring a DVD with a trailer, demo movie, and high quality music for Halo 2.

== Background ==
As audio director for Bungie, Martin O'Donnell was tasked with writing the music for Halo: Combat Evolved. He had scored previous Bungie projects, including Myth: The Fallen Lords, while working for his audio company, TotalAudio, along with Michael Salvatori. O'Donnell stated that he approached the project "with fear and trepidation" and that his main influences were music he liked—"a little Samuel Barber meets Giorgio Moroder". Bungie director of cinematics Joseph Staten told O'Donnell that "the music should give a feeling of importance, weight, and sense of the 'ancient' to the visuals of Halo".

O'Donnell's first piece of music, "Halo", which would become "the signature theme for Halo", was written and recorded in three days. O'Donnell convinced Alex Seropian to allow him to produce an original piece of music for the game's 1999 Macworld Conference & Expo demonstration. He drew inspiration for the theme from the Beatles' "Yesterday". O'Donnell recruited Salvatori and three other colleagues with whom he had recorded jingles—Robert Bowker, Jeffrey Morrow, and Rob Trow—to produce the "chanting monks" that open the piece. Originally, he had intended the Qawwali accents to be sung by one of the professionals, but after singing an example of what he wanted, the others suggested using O'Donnell's rendition instead. The theme premiered at the 1999 Macworld Conference & Expo.

Music Sample:
"Halo"
The piece used for the Macworld Expo 1999 Halo announcement.

The remaining themes were written, recorded, and produced throughout 2001. The music was written with a variety of equipment, including "keyboards, synths, and samplers as well as digital recording equipment were controlled by computers". In addition, MIDI devices such as the Roland XV-5080 and EM-U Proteus 2000 were most prominently used to create the game's soundtrack. Live instrumentations by members of the Chicago Symphony and Chicago Lyric Opera Orchestra were added where needed. The soundtrack features a wide range of sounds O'Donnell described as "Gregorian chant, string orchestra, percussion and just a bit of a 'Qawwali voice'". Working closely with level designers, O'Donnell divided the music into "chunks", which could be played back dynamically by the audio engine depending on the player's actions. For the soundtrack release, O'Donnell rearranged the music featured in the game in order to make listening to the soundtrack "more enjoyable".

Bungie had previously released soundtracks for their games due to fan request, but Microsoft was hesitant to commit to producing a soundtrack for Halo; at the time most video games did not get a commercial soundtrack release. The publisher finally relented after pressure from O'Donnell and the outside solicitation of musician Nile Rodgers, who returned to produce the Halo 2 Original Soundtrack and Halo 3 Original Soundtrack.

== Release ==
The soundtrack was released on compact disc (CD) June 11, 2002. A special edition of the soundtrack was released on October 28, 2003, featuring a DVD with a trailer, demo movie, and high quality music for Halo 2. Laced Records is producing a vinyl edition of the soundtrack across two LPs on its own, or as part of a boxed set with the soundtracks to Halo 2 and 3, to be released in 2025.

== Reception ==
The Halo Original Soundtrack has been widely regarded among the greatest video game soundtracks ever made. Upon release, reception of the soundtrack was very positive. IGN praised the soundtrack for its wide use of instruments: "Where other videogame scores tend to miss their mark when combining electronic and organic elements, O'Donnell and Salvatori seem to have found a rather stable balance between the two divergent sounds." They described the soundtrack as "one of the better videogame oriented musical experiences out there" and noted that playing the game is not required to enjoy the score.

Reviewing for Monsters At Play, Michael Johnson called the soundtrack "66 minutes of orchestral goodness," citing the wide range of music covered as a strong point. Nuketown rated the soundtrack 9 out of 10, describing it as "a welcome and invigorating reminder of good times had blasting unstoppable alien hordes". The release went on to sell over 40,000 copies.

== Track listing ==
All music was written and composed by Martin O'Donnell and Michael Salvatori.

| No. | Title | Length |
|---|---|---|
| 1. | "Opening Suite" | 3:33 |
| 2. | "Truth and Reconciliation Suite" | 8:25 |
| 3. | "Brothers in Arms" | 1:29 |
| 4. | "Enough Dead Heroes" | 3:00 |
| 5. | "Perilous Journey" | 2:26 |
| 6. | "A Walk in the Woods" | 1:52 |
| 7. | "Ambient Wonder" | 1:57 |
| 8. | "The Gun Pointed at the Head of the Universe" | 2:26 |
| 9. | "Trace Amounts" | 1:51 |
| 10. | "Under Cover of Night" | 3:41 |
| 11. | "What Once Was Lost" | 1:40 |
| 12. | "Lament for Pvt. Jenkins" | 1:14 |
| 13. | "Devils... Monsters..." | 1:30 |
| 14. | "Covenant Dance" | 1:57 |
| 15. | "Alien Corridors" | 1:48 |
| 16. | "Rock Anthem for Saving the World" | 1:17 |
| 17. | "The Maw" | 1:06 |
| 18. | "Drumrun" | 1:01 |
| 19. | "On a Pale Horse" | 1:35 |
| 20. | "Perchance to Dream" | 1:00 |
| 21. | "Library Suite" | 6:47 |
| 22. | "The Long Run" | 2:12 |
| 23. | "Suite Autumn" | 4:22 |
| 24. | "Shadows" | 0:59 |
| 25. | "Dust and Echoes" | 2:49 |
| 26. | "Halo" | 4:22 |
| Total length: | | 65:08 |

== Personnel ==
All information is taken from the CD credits.

- Martin O'Donnell (ASCAP) – Writer, composer, musician, and singer
- Michael Salvatori (ASCAP) - Writer, composer, musician, and singer
- Harry Hmura - musician
- Arnie Roth - musician
- Peter Labella - musician
- Everett Zlatoff-Mirsky - musician
- Elliott Golub - musician
- Niasanne Howell - musician
- Marylou Johnston - musician
- Kevin Case - musician
- Barbara Haffner - musician
- Larry Glazier - musician
- Judy Stone - musician
- Robert Bowker - singer
- Jeffrey Morrow - singer
- Rob Trow - singer
