= Steve Downes =

American DJ and voice actor

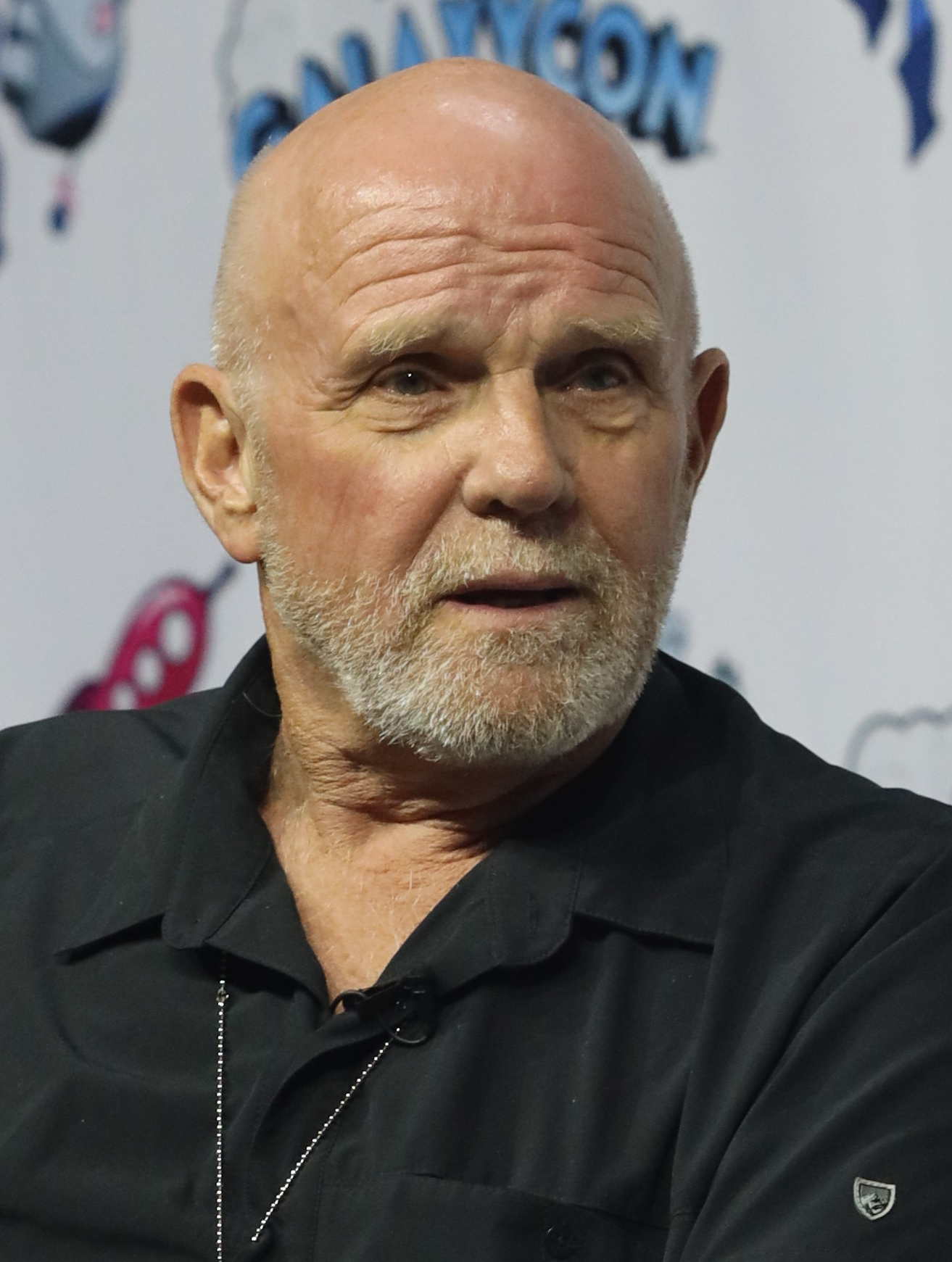
- Downes at GalaxyCon Raleigh in 2022
- Born: Stephen Arthur Downes; June 28, 1950 (age 76); Columbus, Ohio, U.S.
- Occupations: DJ, voice actor
- Years active: 1978–present
- Spouse: Liz Zweifler (m. 1992)
- Website: stevedownesvo.com

Stephen Arthur Downes (born June 28, 1950) is an American disc jockey and voice actor. He is best known for his work as the voice of the Master Chief in the Halo video game series. He worked as a disc jockey at Los Angeles, California Album-oriented Rock radio stations KWST (1978–1981), KEZY-AM (1981–1982) and KLSX (1994), but is best remembered working evening drive at KLOS from 1982 to 1991. He frequently hosted the live call-in talk show, Rockline in the early 1990s. Most recently, he worked as the morning show host for 97.1 WDRV "The Drive" in Chicago, Illinois. Downes also hosts the nationally syndicated radio show "The Classics". He is married to fellow voice actress Liz Zweifler.

On February 6, 2015, Downes announced that after 44 years in radio he would retire to spend more time with his family; his final show on WDRV was March 9, 2015. He was succeeded by veteran sports/talk radio hosts Dan McNeil and Pete McMurray.

== Voice acting ==
Downes started in commercial voice acting in 1990. He has provided voices for several video games. His first experience in voice acting for video games came in 1999 when he played the role of Gunnar in the video game Septerra Core: Legacy of the Creator by Valkyrie Studios. Despite the relatively minor role, his performance caught the attention of the voice acting director and music composer of the game, Martin O'Donnell. When O'Donnell began working on the video game Halo: Combat Evolved at Bungie, he invited Downes to voice the game's main protagonist, Master Chief, a role he has voiced ever since. At GalaxyCon Columbus in December 2023, Downes stated his favorite line as Master Chief is "She said that to me once... about being a machine" from Halo 4.

== Filmography ==
=== Television ===
Year	Title	Voice role	Notes
2012	The Avengers: Earth's Mightiest Heroes	Peter Quill / Star-Lord	Episode: "Michael Korvac"

=== Video games ===
Year	Title	Voice role	Notes
1999	Septerra Core: Legacy of the Creator	Gunnar	
2001	Halo: Combat Evolved	Spartan John-117 / Master Chief	
2004	Halo 2	Spartan John-117 / Master Chief	
2007	Halo 3	Spartan John-117 / Master Chief	
2010	Halo: Reach	Spartan John-117 / Master Chief	Firefight voice
2012	Halo 4	Spartan John-117 / Master Chief	
2015	Halo 5: Guardians	Spartan John-117 / Master Chief	
2017	Super Bomberman R	Spartan John-117 / Master Chief	Xbox One version
2021	Halo Infinite	Spartan John-117 / Master Chief	
2026	Halo: Campaign Evolved	Spartan John-117 / Master Chief	
