= Halo 3 Original Soundtrack =

Soundtrack album by Martin O'Donnell and Michael Salvatori
- Released: November 20, 2007
- Studios: Studio X, Seattle, Washington
- Genre: Video game soundtrack
- Length: 118:36
- Label: Sumthing Else Music Works
- Producer: Nile Rodgers

Halo 3 Original Soundtrack is the official soundtrack to Bungie's first-person shooter video game Halo 3. Most of the original music was composed by Martin O'Donnell and Michael Salvatori, but also includes a bonus track, "LvUrFR3NZ", which was the winning entry in a contest held before the soundtrack's release. The 2-CD set was released on November 20, 2007.

For the next game in the Halo trilogy, O'Donnell added new themes as well as bringing back and expanding old ones, some of which had never been recorded with a full orchestra before. The score made extensive use of the piano, an instrument which O'Donnell used frequently for composition but that had not been featured in previous Halo music. In addition to scoring the game, the music was used for promotional advertisements and trailers preceding Halo 3's release. The game's score and its soundtrack were generally well received. The soundtrack reached the Billboard 200 chart, and also broke the top twenty best-selling soundtracks and independent albums listings. The score was nominated for X-Play's "Best of 2007" awards, under best original soundtrack.

== Background ==
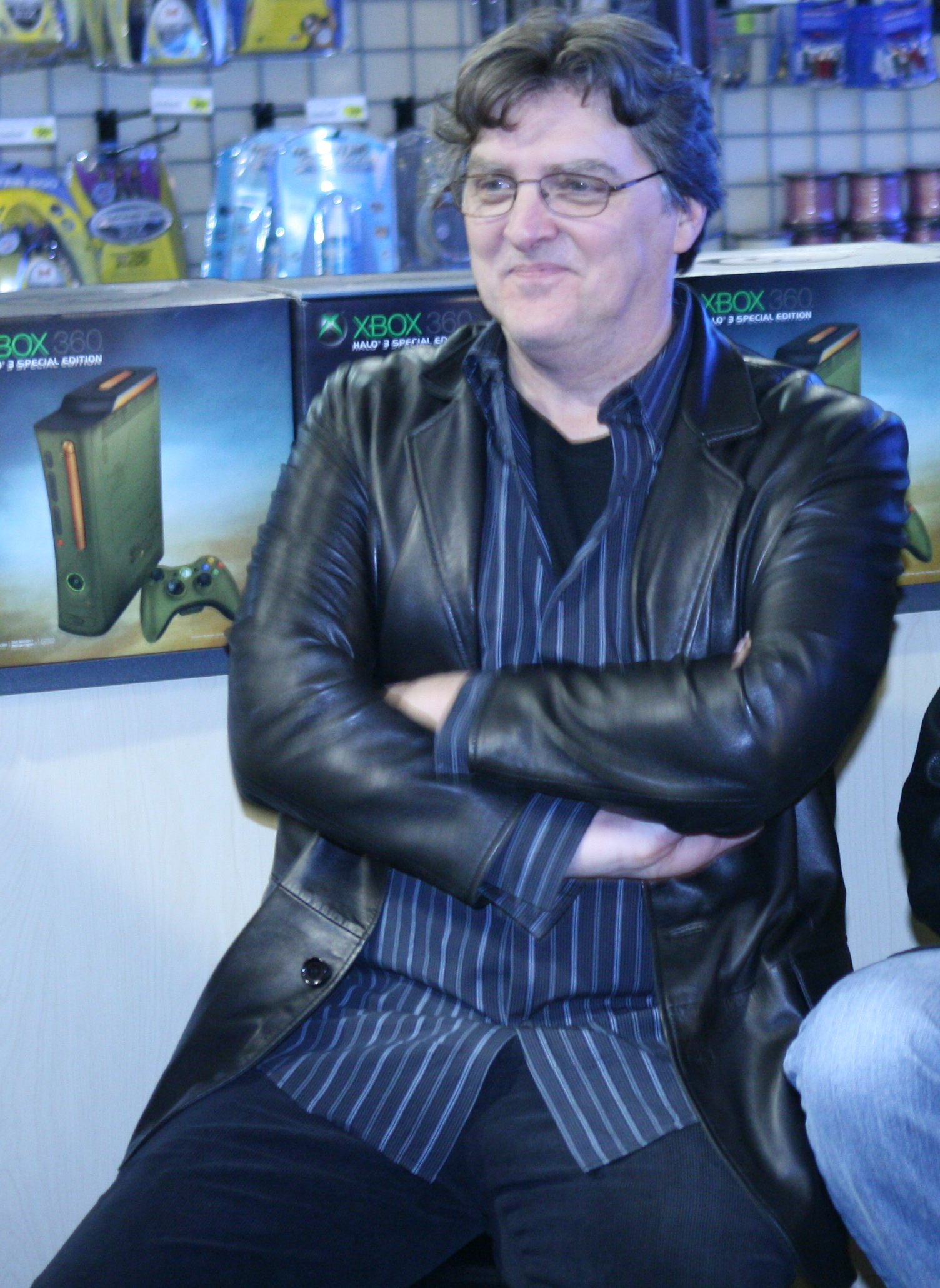
Martin O'Donnell at the launch of Halo 3 in Bellevue, Washington

The score for Halo 3 gave O'Donnell and Salvatori a chance to rework and revise existing themes heard in the games, as well as create new ones. Halo: Combat Evolved featured more strings, while the soundtrack to Halo 2 featured conventional video game music staples such as guitars by Steve Vai; in an interview, O'Donnell noted that "to be honest, when I got to the end of Halo 2 I thought to myself: 'that was probably enough guitar.'" He intentionally made the score to the final game a shift back to the orchestral roots of the series, stating "I took an orthodox, almost formal approach to the trilogy." O'Donnell acknowledged that some games and movies used entirely different music with each sequel, but such an approach wasn't an option with Halo 3, the third installment of a trilogy: "The Master Chief is still green, Cortana is still blue, and so you're going to hear the monks and the cellos."

O'Donnell began by writing out the reworked themes and music he wanted to hear in the game, without knowing where he would eventually use the sounds. He approaches composition from the piano, and described his process as looking for something that "makes me go 'oh, that's a good feeling'". O'Donnell's approach to writing music for games is to put in the audio at the last minute of development, so that his music meshes with the game play in the best possible way; he still had not added the score when Halo 3 was demoed at Electronic Entertainment Expo 2007, less than three months away from the game's debut.

Unlike previous soundtracks, where much of the music had been synthesized on computer, the soundtrack for Halo 3 was recorded using a 60-piece orchestra, along with a 24 voice chorus. The music was recorded by the Northwest Sinfonia at Studio X in Seattle, Washington. Interviewed by some of Bungie's staff for the Bungie Podcast, O'Donnell noted that there was more "techno" and "tribal" sounds than on previous soundtracks. O'Donnell also tried to avoid outside musical influences, as he believes that "Bungie should be creating culture, not being influenced by it."

Scoring for a video game, O'Donnell noted, is different from a film in that a good score sounds like it is narrating what the player does on screen; Halo 3 uses an audio engine which allows music cues to naturally start, stop, and transition in response to game triggers. Working from his office at Bungie, dubbed the "Ivory Tower", O'Donnell worked with mission designers to set points in the game that trigger segments of music. Instead of pieces with a set duration, songs in the game have multiple variations that can be looped and arranged to fill the time it takes the player to travel from point A to point B. Since the interactive mixing of sounds in Halo 3 depends on what occurs in the game, O'Donnell instead "froze" the music into set suites and transitions for the CD, so that a listener playing the soundtrack through would hear a musical representation of the game. The tracks are presented, similarly to the previous soundtrack for Halo 2, in a suite form. The suites are named after the nine Campaign missions and unlike Volume Two, are broken into separate tracks.

== Promotion ==
Martin O'Donnell confirmed Halo 3's soundtrack would see a commercial release in a Bungie podcast. O'Donnell also stressed that the soundtrack would not be released at or near the release date of the game on September 25, 2007. The soundtrack was officially announced on October 17, 2007.

Finish the Fight
The piece used for the E3 2006 Halo 3 announcement trailer, featuring piano and brass sections.

The score to the game was used extensively for marketing purposes, even before the release of the game. The first piece heard was entitled "Finish the Fight", and was used in the announcement trailer for Halo 3 at E3 2006. This piece was accented with O'Donnell's well-known Halo theme, which now included a trumpet fanfare and heavy brass section; O'Donnell stated "I want the viewer to have a feeling of anticipation and wonder for the first fifty seconds or so, up until Master Chief is revealed and they realize that it's Cortana trying to tell them something." The track opens with a piano section, uncharacteristic for the series at that point; O'Donnell suspected "no [other announcement at E3] would start with a piano", thus grabbing attention. O'Donnell designed the opening to lull the listener into a sense of suspense, then wonder; "I want them to feel pride and longing the moment Master Chief walks out of the smoke." he said. "I want them to be left with that, 'I can hardly wait to play this game' feeling". Another reworked theme from Halo was used as the background music for the Halo 3 E3 2007 trailer; O'Donnell later offered this track for free online.

In addition to the music composed by O'Donnell and Salvatori, the announcement of the Halo 3 Soundtrack was followed with a call for entries to all artists or bands to submit their own original song to be included on the final CD. The submissions were judged by O'Donnell, producer Nile Rodgers, and other artists including Steve Vai. Rodgers stated that more than 21,000 songs were entered, and at least 30% were "amazing"; the winner was Greg Haupt and his band Princeton, whose song "LvUrFR3NZ" appears as the final track on the second disc.

== Reception ==
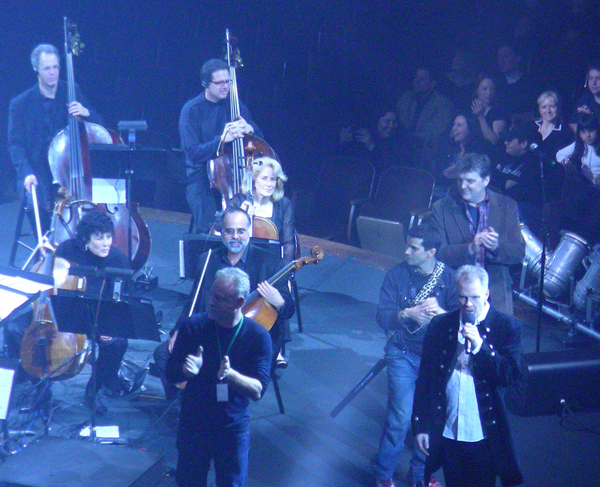
O'Donnell (top right on stage) at Video Games Live

Reception to the soundtrack was positive. Scorenotes.com gave the soundtrack high marks, praising the presentation as well as the piano motif introduced; the reviewer judged that the soundtrack for the third game surpassed those of the previous titles. UGO Networks praised the reworked main theme, stating that the video game "would not have been the same" without O'Donnell's score. Game Informer's Brendan Vore concurred, saying that "there's nothing like hearing Halo's signature 'da-da-da-duuum' as you rush into a squad of Brutes." Conversely, IGN found the piano theme was perennially overplayed, and felt that the soundtrack "begins with a bit of a bang and then eventually sputters out". The Halo 3 Soundtrack reached a peak position of #18 on Billboard's Top Soundtracks list, #20 on Top Independent Albums, and the bottom position on the Billboard 200 on December 15, 2007. The soundtrack had an impact outside of the gaming world; fueled by interest in Halo's chants, Universal Music aggressively promoted a chant-based album, Chant: Music for the Soul, that sold 55,000 copies in its first two weeks.

Halo 3's music has been featured at several concerts, including Play! A Video Game Symphony. O'Donnell also specially arranged the Halo music for a performance of Video Games Live, and appeared at a London performance. Video Games Live has incorporated the music from Halo 3 into many of its performances, including the opening to the London Games Festival, and the 2008 Game Developer's Conference in San Francisco. Arrangements featuring music from Halo 3 appears on the album releases Video Games Live, Vol. 1 and Video Games Live, Level 2.

=== Awards ===
The audio and sound for Halo 3 were nominated for numerous awards, including the 2007 Spike TV Video Game Awards "Best Original Score". Both the sound and score of Halo 3 were also nominated as finalists in the 6th Annual Game Audio Network Guild Awards, and X-Play's "Best of 2007" Awards in the "Best Original Soundtrack" category.

== Track listing ==
Disc 1
No.	Title	Length
1.	"Arrival" I. "Luck" (3:25)
2.	"Sierra 117" I. "Released" (5:20) II. "Infiltrate" (3:50)
3.	"Crow's Nest": I. "Honorable Intentions" (2:46); II. "Last of the Brave" (3:58); III. "Brutes" (5:07)
4.	"Tsavo Highway": I. "Out of Shadow" (4:37); II. "To Kill a Demon" (3:44)
5.	"The Storm": I. "This Is Our Land" (4:00); II. "This Is the Hour" (2:08)
6.	"Floodgate": I. "Dread Intrusion" (5:25); II. "Follow Our Brothers" (3:25)
7.	"The Ark": I. "Farthest Outpost" (5:14); II. "Behold a Pale Horse" (5:38); III. "Edge Closer" (3:03)
Total length:		61:40

Disc 2
No.	Title	Length
1.	"The Covenant": I. "Three Gates" (4:34); II. "Black Tower" (6:30); III. "One Final Effort" (3:08); IV. "Gravemind" (5:21)
2.	"Cortana": I. "No More Dead Heroes" (5:01); II. "Keep What You Steal" (2:36)
3.	"Halo": I. "Halo Reborn" (3:59); II. "Greatest Journey" (4:52)
4.	"Ending": I. "Tribute" (2:52); II. "Roll Call" (5:58); III. "Wake Me When You Need Me" (2:19); IV. "Legend" (0:40)
5.	"Bonus Tracks": I. "Choose Wisely" (1:18); II. "Movement" (0:27); III. "Never Forget" (3:07); IV. "Finish the Fight" (2:27); V. "LvUrFR3NZ" (2:18)
Total length:		57:00

== Personnel ==
All information is taken from the CD credits.

- Martin O'Donnell (ASCAP) – composer
- Michael Salvatori (ASCAP) – composer
- C Paul Johnson (ASCAP) – addition composition on tracks "To Kill a Demon", "This Is Our Land", "Keep What you Steal", and "Greatest Journey"
- Simon James – concert master/contractor
- David Sabee – Northwest Sinfonia conductor
- Joe Crnko – choir conductor
- Stan LePard – additional orchestration
- Nile Rodgers – producer
