= Guilty Party (video game) =

2010 video game

- North American box art
- Developer: Wideload Games
- Publisher: Disney Interactive Studios
- Composer: Michael Salvatori
- Platform: Wii
- Release: NA: August 26, 2010
- Genres: Party, puzzle
- Modes: Single-player, multiplayer

Guilty Party (also known as Disney's Guilty Party) is a party puzzle video game developed by Wideload Games and published by Disney Interactive Studios for the Wii. The goal of the game is to discover the identity of the culprit in a whodunit-style mystery. Gameplay proceeds in turns where the player moves through the board game-like setting, searching for clues.

== Story ==
In the game Guilty Party, the player assumes the role of a family member of the Dickens Detective Agency, led by the family's patriarch, the Commodore. The Commodore plans to retire, and give the family business to someone once he's gone, but there is more to do than figure out the successor to the family business. The Commodore's nemesis, a master criminal named Mr. Valentine, knows that he is retiring. Valentine launches their ultimate crime spree, and it's up to the Dickens Detective Agency to stop him. Mr. Valentine kidnaps the Commodore's wife Olivia & the story goes through several levels, where the detectives must look for clues and the testimony of the suspects to find the Guilty Party and finally to unmask Valentine.

== Reception ==
Reception

Aggregate score
| Aggregator | Score |
|---|---|
| Metacritic | 78/100 |

Review scores
| Publication | Score |
|---|---|
| Destructoid | 8.5/10 |
| Nintendo Life | 8/10 |
| Nintendo Power | 7.0/10 |

Justin Cheng of Nintendo Power found the motion-controlled minigames "simple yet entertaining (though repetitive)" but was caught off guard by the game's comedic writing, saying that he was "pleasantly surprised to discover that Guilty Party had some genuinely funny moments".
