= Michael Salvatori =

American composer (born 1954)

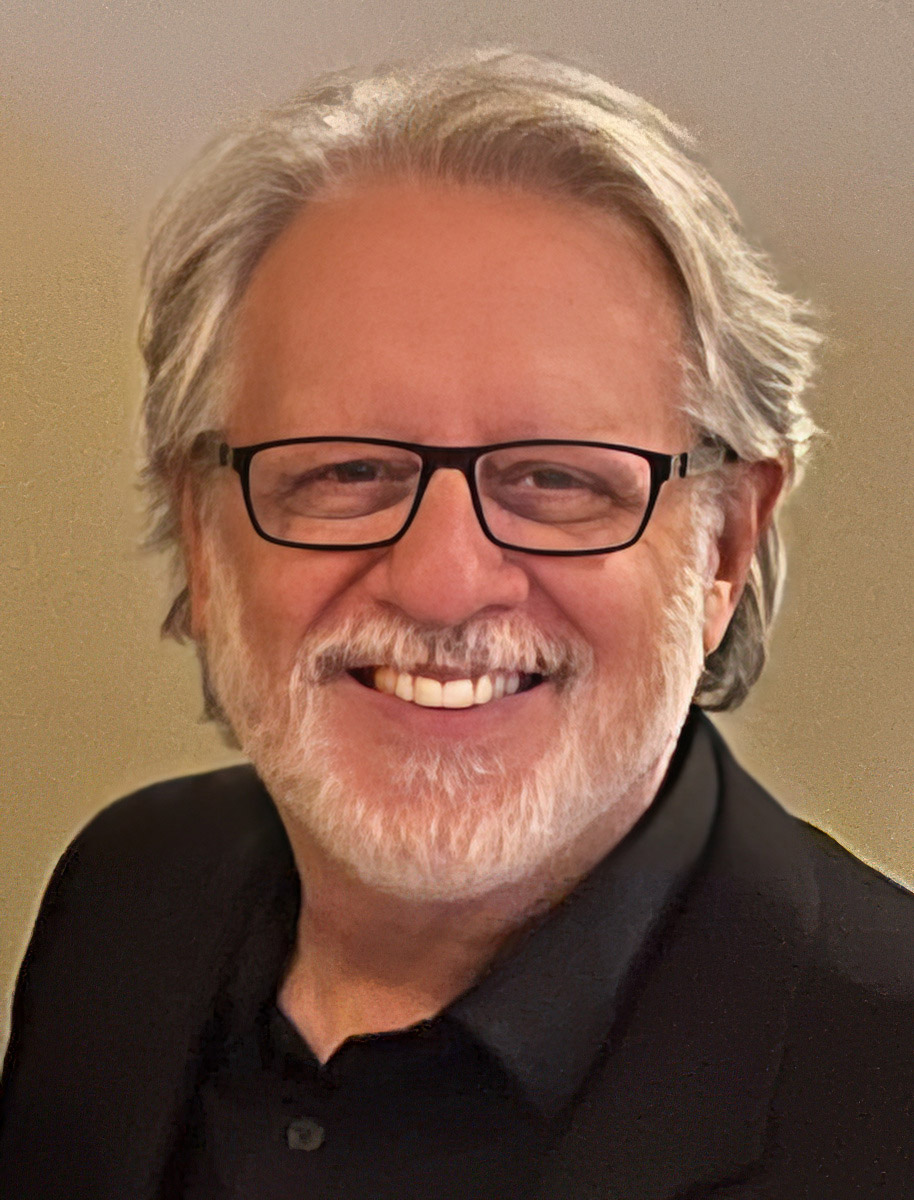
- Salvatori in 2022

Background information
- Born: April 18, 1954 (age 72); Elmhurst, Illinois, U.S.
- Occupation: Composer
- Instruments: Piano, guitar
- Years active: Since 1982

Michael C. Salvatori (born April 18, 1954) is an American composer best known for his collaboration with colleague Martin O'Donnell for the soundtracks to the Halo video game series. Salvatori became acquainted with O'Donnell in college; when O'Donnell was given a job ofer to score a colleague's film, Salvatori and O'Donnell formed a partnership and eventually created their own production company, TotalAudio. Salvatori continued to manage TotalAudio and worked on his own music for clients such as Wideload Games (later under Disney).

He co-composed the soundtrack to the 2014 video game Destiny and its expansions, The Taken King (2015) and Rise of Iron (2016). He also composed music for Destiny 2 (2017) as well as its expansions, Forsaken (2018), Shadowkeep (2019), Beyond Light (2020), The Witch Queen (2022), Lightfall (2023), and The Final Shape (2024).

== Biography ==
=== Early life ===
Michael Salvatori was born in Elmhurst, Illinois, in 1954. He attended Visitation Catholic School until eighth grade. He then attended York High School in the early 70s. After Salvatori had finished college he took a bank loan to build a basement studio at his home in Wheaton, which would later be used to record Salvatori's first solo album, Waiting for Autumn, published in 1982 when Salvatori was aged 28. The album sold around five hundred copies, some of which are owned by Salvatori due to how rare they have become.

=== Early works ===
Salvatori wrote music for his own rock band while he was in college, and became friends with Martin O'Donnell. O'Donnell eventually moved to Chicago after completing his degrees, and was approached with a job offer to score a colleague's film. Since Salvatori had his own recording studio, O'Donnell offered to split the job with him; the two became partners.

Soon after producing the music for Myth II, Bungie contracted O'Donnell for several of Bungie's other projects, including the third-person game Oni. Bungie wanted to re-negotiate the contracts for Oni in 1999, which resulted in O'Donnell joining the Bungie team ten days before the company was bought by Microsoft. Salvatori remained behind to manage the business aspect of TotalAudio, which he continues to do.

=== Bungie ===
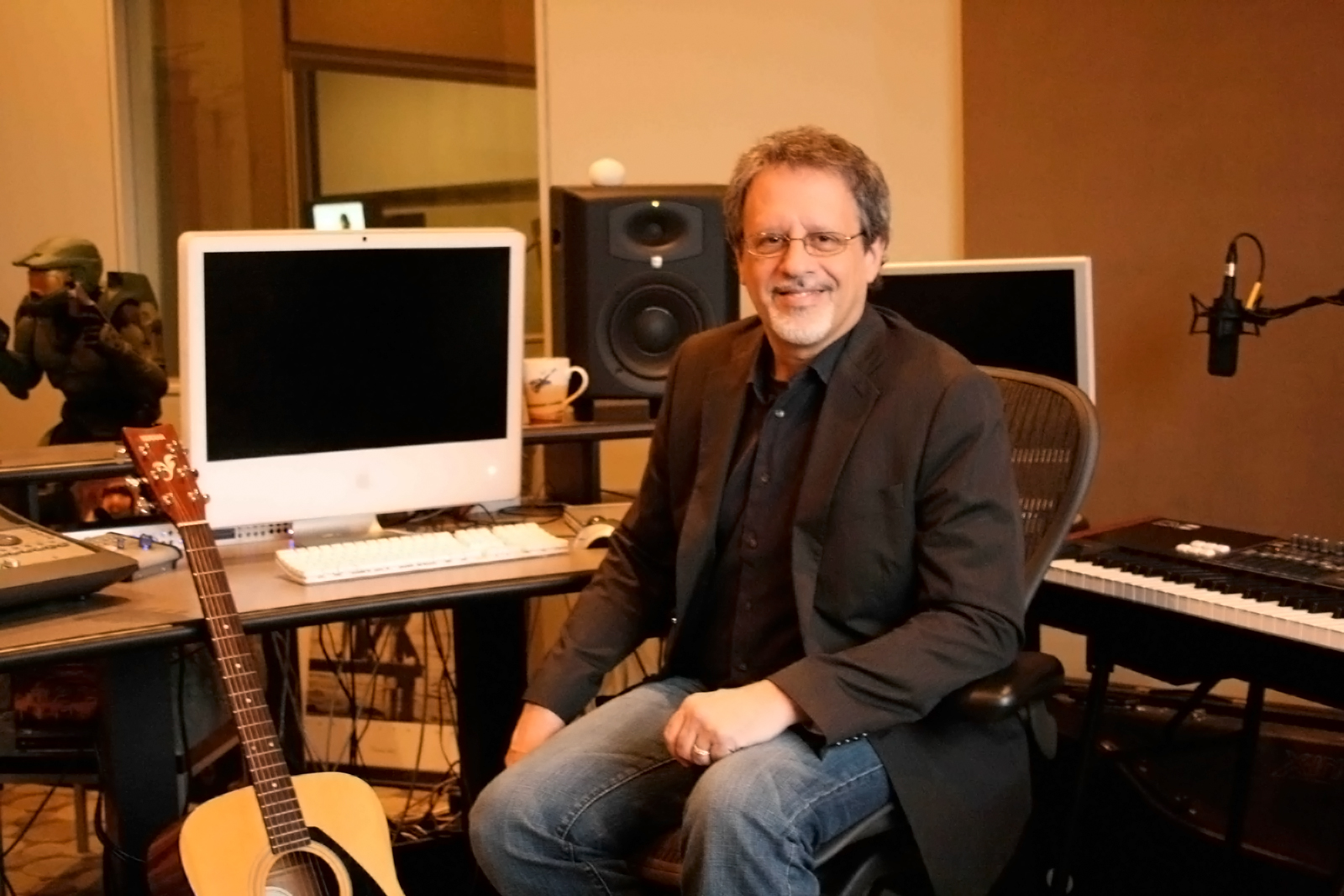
Salvatori in his studio

O'Donnell and Salvatori's company TotalAudio was contracted to produce the music for Bungie's upcoming title, Halo: Combat Evolved. During production Bungie decided that instead of contracting work to O'Donnell, they would hire him. Salvatori remained at TotalAudio to manage the business aspect of the company, and shortly after O'Donnell joined the team, Bungie was bought by Microsoft. Salvatori co-composed the music for Halo's sequels—Halo 2 and Halo 3—with O'Donnell, who has called Salvatori one of his musical influences.

For the music to Halo 3: ODST, O'Donnell began work on crafting the game's themes before Salvatori joined the team in February 2009. "Marty [O'Donnell] had started writing before me, and sent me some of his ideas," Salvatori said. "I picked a few that I felt I could add some magic to, and worked on those. I also came up with several ideas that I sent to Marty that he put his hands on." Once the duo felt they had enough material, the Chicago-based Salvatori flew to Bungie in Seattle to complete the arrangements and record live musicians.

Early on, the team decided that rather than rely on old Halo themes, ODST would feature all-new music. "It was a bit intimidating at first," Salvatori recalled, "because in previous Halo games if new ideas weren't coming, I could always dust off an old one and give it a new spin. I was afraid that we might hit some writer's block along the way, but that didn't happen at all. Instead, we had the freedom to explore some new musical territory, and the ideas flowed pretty quickly." With the exception of the main player character, O'Donnell and Salvatori did not compose themes to represent characters. While the game's setting in Africa inspired some percussion pieces, the team was interested in a sparser atmosphere, which Salvatori described as "a bit darker and less epic".

Salvatori co-composed the soundtrack to the 2014 video game, Destiny which won the 2014 Original Dramatic Score, New IP by National Academy of Video Game Trade Reviewers (NAVGTR).

He helped to write Destiny 2's soundtrack, released Fall 2017.

In October 2023, Salvatori was laid off from Bungie amid staff cutbacks across the company.

=== Collections and other work ===
O'Donnell and Salvatori's music has been packaged and released in physical and digital forms. The soundtracks feature "frozen" arrangements that represent an approximation of a play-through of the games. The Halo Original Soundtrack sold over 40,000 copies, and was followed by two different releases of the music to Halo 2. The two volumes of the Halo 2 Original Soundtrack were produced by Nile Rodgers, with the first album being released in sync with the video game in 2004 and became the best-selling game soundtrack of all time. The second album was released more than a year after the soundtrack had been mixed and mastered. Halo 3's soundtrack was released in November 2007, and featured a fan contribution that was the select winner from a pool of entries judged by O'Donnell, Rodgers, and others. All of Salvatori's contemporary work on the series was repackaged as Halo Trilogy—The Complete Original Soundtracks in December 2008, alongside preview tracks written by Halo Wars composer Stephen Rippy. The music for ODST was released in a two-disc set on September 22, 2009.

Salvatori continues to engineer, produce and compose his own music. Aside from Halo and Destiny, he has served as the audio lead and composer for Stubbs the Zombie. He also created the music for Hail to the Chimp and Disney's Guilty Party.

Salvatori made a guest appearance in the Nostalgia Critic episode "Planet of the Commercials" for the Flintstones Vitamins jingle, even though the real writer behind that jingle was his partner Martin O'Donnell.

=== Video game music works ===
Year	Name	Developer	Notes
1997	Myth: The Fallen Lords	Bungie	Co-composer with Martin O'Donnell and Paul Heitsch
1998	Myth 2: Soulblighter	Bungie	Co-composer with Martin O'Donnell
1999	Septerra Core	Valkyrie Studios	Co-composer with Martin O'Donnell
2001	Oni	Bungie	Co-composer with Martin O'Donnell, Paul Sebastien, and Brian Salter
2001	Halo: Combat Evolved	Bungie	Co-composer with Martin O'Donnell
2004	Halo 2	Bungie	Co-composer with Martin O'Donnell
2005	Stubbs the Zombie	Wideload Games	
2007	Halo 3	Bungie	Co-composer with Martin O'Donnell and C Paul Johnson
2008	Hail to the Chimp	Wideload Games	
2009	Halo 3: ODST	Bungie	Co-composer with Martin O'Donnell, C Paul Johnson, and Stan LePard
2010	Disney's Guilty Party	Wideload Games	
2010	Halo: Reach	Bungie	Co-composer with Martin O'Donnell, C Paul Johnson, Stan LePard, and Ivan Ives
2012	Destiny: Music of the Spheres	Bungie	Co-composer with Martin O'Donnell and Paul McCartney
2014	Destiny	Bungie	Co-composer with Martin O'Donnell, C Paul Johnson, Skye Lewin, Stan LePard, and Paul McCartney
2014	Destiny: The Dark Below	Bungie	Co-composer with C Paul Johnson
2015	Destiny: House of Wolves	Bungie	Co-composer with C Paul Johnson, Skye Lewin, and Laurence Berteig
2015	Destiny: The Taken King	Bungie	Co-composer with C Paul Johnson, Skye Lewin, and Stan LePard
2016	Destiny: Rise of Iron	Bungie	Co-composer with Skye Lewin, C Paul Johnson, Rotem Moav, and Michael Sechrist
2017	Destiny 2	Bungie	Co-composer with Skye Lewin, C Paul Johnson, Rotem Moav, Pieter Schlosser, Kris Dirksen, and Nikola Jeremic
2017	Destiny 2: Curse of Osiris	Bungie	Co-composer with Skye Lewin, C Paul Johnson, Rotem Moav, Pieter Schlosser, and Michael Sechrist
2018	Destiny 2: Warmind	Bungie	Co-composer with Skye Lewin, C Paul Johnson, Rotem Moav, Pieter Schlosser, Kris Dirsken, and Nikola Jeremic
2018	Destiny 2: Forsaken	Bungie	Co-composer with Skye Lewin, Rotem Moav, Pieter Schlosser, Michael Sechrist, Josh Mosser, Brendon Williams, Wilbert Roget II, and Kris Dirksen
2019	Destiny 2: Shadowkeep	Bungie	Co-composer with Skye Lewin, Josh Mosser, Michael Sechrist, Rotem Moav, and Pieter Schlosser
2020	Destiny 2: Beyond Light	Bungie	Co-composer with Skye Lewin, Josh Mosser, Michael Sechrist, Rotem Moav, and Pieter Schlosser
2022	Destiny 2: The Witch Queen	Bungie	Co-composer with Skye Lewin, Josh Mosser, Michael Sechrist, Rotem Moav, and Pieter Schlosser
2023	Destiny 2: Lightfall	Bungie	Co-composer with Skye Lewin, Josh Mosser, Michael Sechrist, Rotem Moav, and Pieter Schlosser
2024	Destiny 2: The Final Shape	Bungie	Co-composer with Skye Lewin, Josh Mosser, Michael Sechrist, Rotem Moav, Pieter Schlosser, and Kris Dirksen
2025	Destiny 2: Renegades	Bungie	Co-composer with Brendon Williams, Nolan Markey, and Josh Mosser
