= Martin O'Donnell =

American video game composer (born 1955)

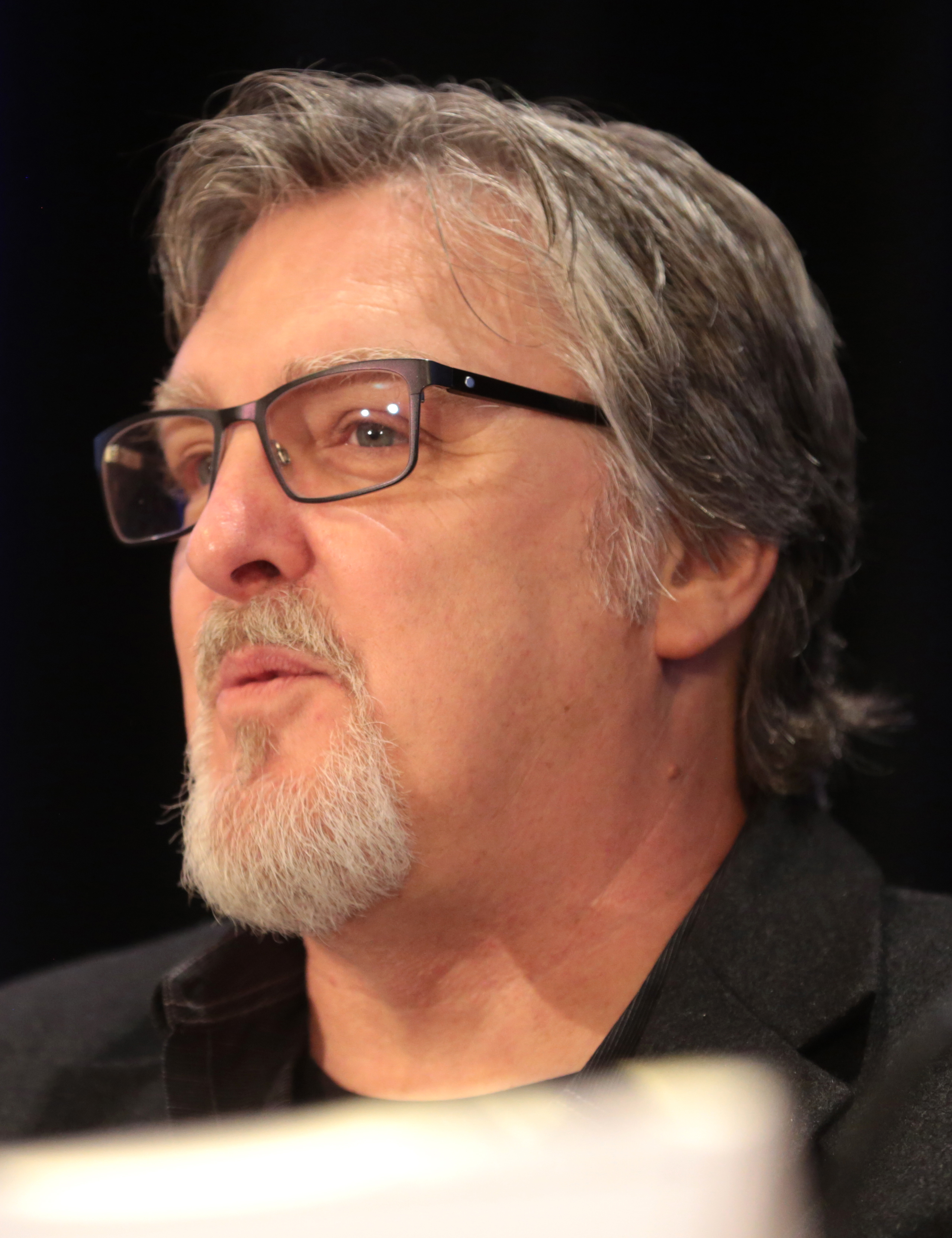
- O'Donnell in 2018
- Born: May 1, 1955 (age 71)
- Education: Wheaton College (BM); University of Southern California (MM)
- Occupations: Composer; audio director; sound designer
- Years active: 1982–present
- Political party: Republican
- Children: 2
- Musical career
- Genres: Classical music; video game music
- Instruments: Piano; electronic keyboard

Martin O'Donnell (born May 1, 1955) is an American composer, audio director, and sound designer best known for his work on video game developer Bungie's titles, including the Myth series, Oni, the Halo series, and Destiny. O'Donnell collaborated with Michael Salvatori for all of the scores; he has also directed voice talent and sound design for the Halo trilogy.

O'Donnell began his career in music writing television and radio jingles such as the Flintstones Chewable Vitamins jingle and scoring for radio stations and films. O'Donnell moved to composing video game music when his company, TotalAudio, did the sound design for the 1997 title Riven. After producing the music for Myth II, Bungie contracted O'Donnell to work on their other projects, including Oni and the project that would become Halo: Combat Evolved. O'Donnell ended up joining the Bungie staff ten days before the studio was bought by Microsoft, and was the audio director for all Bungie projects until he was fired in April 2014.

O'Donnell's score to the Halo trilogy has received critical acclaim, earning him several awards, and the commercial soundtrack release of the music to Halo 2 was the best-selling video game soundtrack of all time in the United States, and the first video game soundtrack to break the Billboard 200. He composed the scores for Halo 3 (2007), Halo 3: ODST (2009), and Halo: Reach (2010). His final work for Bungie was composing music for the 2014 video game Destiny. He successfully sued Bungie for unpaid wages and stock ownership. Subsequently, he co-founded Highwire Games and composed the score for their debut virtual reality game Golem, which was released in late 2019.

O'Donnell was the Republican nominee to represent Nevada's 3rd congressional district in the 2026 and was defeated by incumbent Democrat Susie Lee. He was a candidate in the Republican primary for this seat in 2024.

== Early life and education ==
O'Donnell describes his upbringing as "typical"; he received piano lessons and wanted to start a rock band when he was in junior high school. His father made films while his mother taught piano. Despite his interest in progressive and fusion rock, O'Donnell studied the classical component of music and composition at Wheaton College Conservatory of Music and received his Masters of Music Degree in composition with honors from the University of Southern California in the early 1980s.

== Career ==
After getting his degree, O'Donnell moved to Chicago, where he expected that he would teach at the American Conservatory of Music. The job fell through, and instead he worked as a grip in the film and television business. O'Donnell began his musical career in the field after one of his colleagues who knew of his music background approached him to write for his film. O'Donnell talked to his friend Michael Salvatori, who had his own recording studio, and offered to split the profits from the job with him; the two became constant partners.

After completing a film score and a few commercials, the two decided to quit their day jobs and produce music in Chicago; they founded a production company, TotalAudio. O'Donnell composed the music for jingles for Mr. Clean and Flintstones Chewable Vitamins. After fifteen years of composing for TV and radio commercials, he decided that he wanted to work on game soundtracks and move on from commercial-sounding music. "I was hoping to find some other medium that would be new and cutting-edge and sort of the Wild West," he recalled.

=== Video games ===
In 1993, Dick Staub, a Chicago radio personality and friend of O'Donnell's, asked if his eighteen-year-old son Josh could visit O'Donnell's studio, as he was interested in computer games and audio. O'Donnell agreed, and in talking with Josh learned that he had friends in Spokane, Washington who were making a game O'Donnell had never heard of called Myst. In hearing the theme music to the game, O'Donnell realized that the game industry was making great strides in creating "legitimate music" that contained dramatic elements. O'Donnell became acquainted with the game's developers, including brothers Rand and Robyn Miller, and was hired four years later as a sound designer for Myst's sequel, Riven. Among the games Riven's developers would play in their downtime was a title called Marathon, created by Chicago-based Bungie. On returning to Chicago O'Donnell emailed a Bungie staffer and pursued them for a job.

TotalAudio produced the music for Bungie's Myth: The Fallen Lords the same year. The company later composed the music for Valkyrie Studio's Septerra Core: Legacy of the Creator, during which O'Donnell met Steve Downes, whom he would later recommend as the voice actor for the Master Chief. O'Donnell described the work for Septerra Core as his most difficult assignment; during the production the TotalAudio studio burned to the ground and O'Donnell had to be hoisted through a window in order to save some 20 hours of recordings.

After producing the music for Myth II, Bungie contracted O'Donnell for several of their other projects, including the game Oni. In 1999, Bungie wanted to re-negotiate the contracts for Oni, and the negotiations resulted in O'Donnell joining the Bungie team, ten days before the company was bought by Microsoft. O'Donnell was one of a handful of Bungie employees who remained working at the company since then, until his termination as of April 2014. While O'Donnell worked at Bungie, Salvatori handled the business side of TotalAudio.

==== Bungie ====
After producing the music for Oni, O'Donnell was tasked with composing the music for Bungie's next project, which would be unveiled at E3 2000. After talking with Joseph Staten, O'Donnell decided the music needed to be "big, exciting, and unusual with a classical orchestra touch to give it some weight and stature. We also wanted it to have some sort of 'ancient' feel to it." O'Donnell came up with the idea of opening the piece with gregorian chant and jotted down the melody in his car. Because he did not know how long the presentation would be, O'Donnell created "smushy" opening and closing sections that could be expanded or cut as time required to back up a rhythmic middle section. The music was recorded and sent to New York the same night the piece was finished; the resulting music became the basis for the Halo series' "highly recognizable" signature sound, and what has been called one of the best-known video game themes. The use of the chant in the main theme has been credited with contributing to popular interest in the genre. Halo's music used an interactive engine to change music in response to player's actions; this non-linear method has since become widespread. The scores for Halo and its sequel Halo 2 garnered awards such as The Game Developers Choice Award and Best Original Video Game Soundtrack from Rolling Stone.

The music for Halo 3 contained refinements and revisions to previous themes heard in the series, as O'Donnell stressed the importance of using previous motifs in the final installment of the trilogy; O'Donnell wanted to "blow out" the epic sounds from the first game. O'Donnell also introduced a distinctive piano theme which had not been heard before, and made its appearance in the Halo 3 announcement teaser. In an interview, O'Donnell stated that he has always approached music from the keyboard, and that at the Electronic Entertainment Expo—where the trailer would first be shown—he had a feeling that, "no [other announcement] would start with a piano." O'Donnell planned on composing the music "at the last minute", saying he had no intention of producing a large amount of music that would never be used. "It drives everyone crazy but it worked for me in the past and it works for the game in the best way. Writing music before the end just doesn't work for me," he said.

For Halo 3: ODST, a planned expansion to Halo 3 that became a full game, O'Donnell and Salvatori abandoned all previous Halo themes and started anew. Due to ODST's shift to a new protagonist, O'Donnell created music that was evocative of past Halo but branched in a different direction. Since Bungie was aiming for a smaller, detective story feel, O'Donnell felt that a jazz-influenced approach worked best in echoing the film noir atmosphere.

In creating music for Halo: Reach, a prequel to Combat Evolved, O'Donnell wanted to create music with a "grittier" feel because of the dark nature of the story. Reach was Bungie's last Halo project. O'Donnell called the prospect of writing new music both a challenge and a relief to step away from the iconic themes of Halo.

In 2015, music from the Halo series was voted by listeners into the Classic FM Hall of Fame for the first time, reaching position 244.

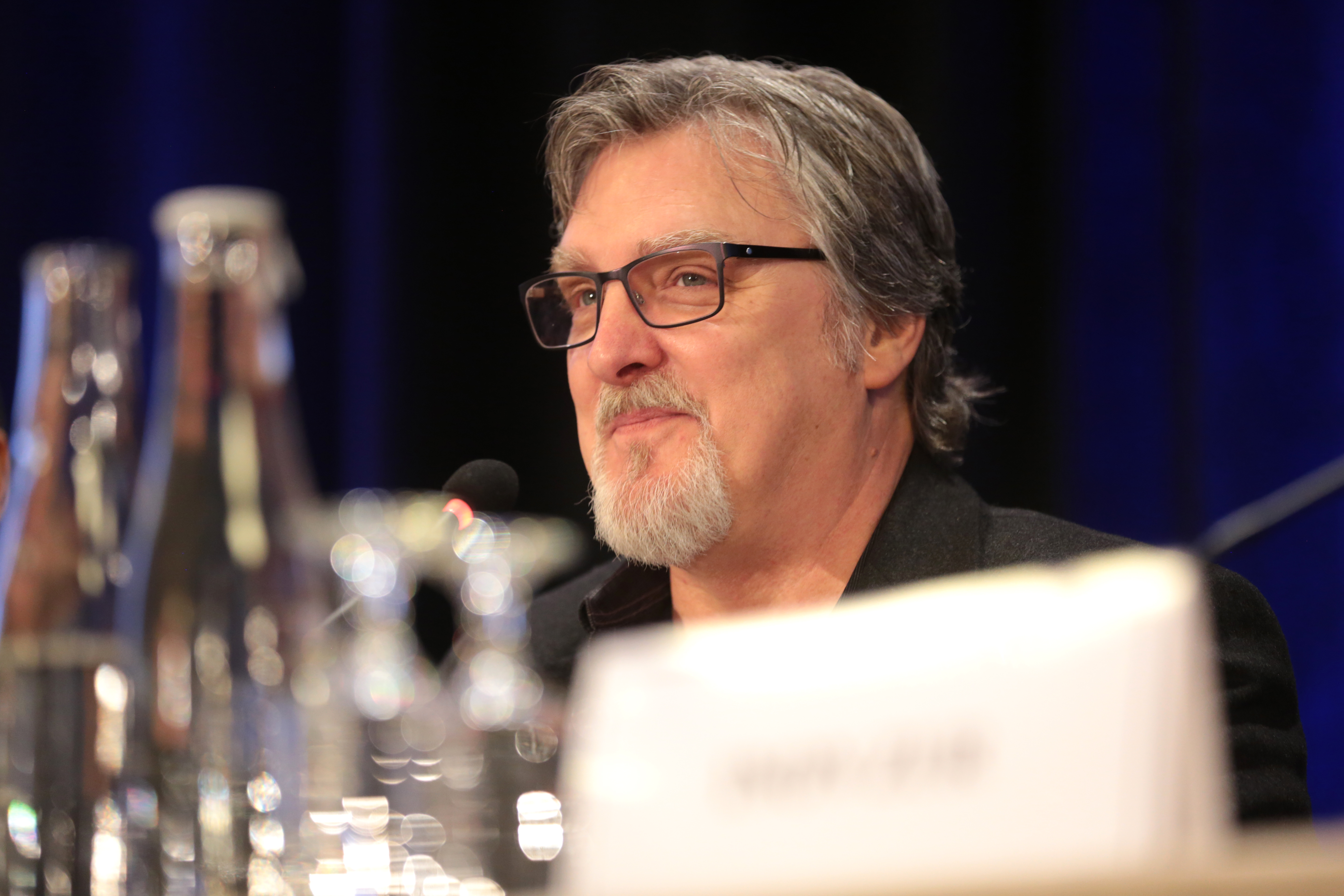
O'Donnell at an event in 2018

Early in the video game Destiny's development, O'Donnell began composition of an eight-movement symphonic suite entitled Music of the Spheres. Collaborating with Paul McCartney as well as Michael Salvatori and C. Paul Johnson, the symphony contained music to be implemented in Destiny, as well as any future installments of the franchise. On April 11, 2014, O'Donnell announced via Twitter he had been fired from Bungie "without cause". In June 2014, he filed a lawsuit against Bungie president Harold Ryan, claiming he was terminated without cause and that Ryan withheld pay for vacation and sabbatical time. In a response filed in Washington's Superior Court, Ryan denied wrongdoing. The suit was settled in June 2014, with a final arbitration ruling decided September 4, 2015, in which the court stated that "Bungie breached the duty of good faith and fair dealing when it caused the closure of O'Donnell's stock and denied him any participation in the Profit Participation Plan". At the 18th Annual D.I.C.E. Awards, Destiny was awarded with Outstanding Achievement in Original Music Composition and Outstanding Achievement in Sound Design.

==== Post-Bungie ====
In 2015, O'Donnell founded video game development studio Highwire Games. He worked on the soundtrack to their debut game Golem, a VR game which was released on November 15, 2019. A musical prequel album to the game, Echoes of the First Dreamer (The Musical Prequel to Golem) was released by video game music label Materia Collective.

== Collections ==
O'Donnell's music has been packaged into several soundtrack collections. For Halo's music, O'Donnell created "frozen" arrangements that represented an approximation of a play-through of the games. The Halo Original Soundtrack sold over 40,000 copies, and was followed by two different releases of the music to Halo 2. The two volumes of the Halo 2 Original Soundtrack were produced by Nile Rodgers, with the first album being released in sync with the video game in 2004 and became the best-selling game soundtrack of all time in the United States. The second album was released more than a year after the soundtrack had been mixed and mastered.

The Halo 3 Original Soundtrack was released in November 2007, and featured a fan contribution that was the select winner from a pool of entries judged by O'Donnell, Rodgers, and others. All of O'Donnell's work on the series was repackaged as Halo Trilogy—The Complete Original Soundtracks in December 2008, alongside preview tracks written by Halo Wars composer Stephen Rippy. The music to Halo 3: ODST was released as a two-disc set to coincide with the game's release on September 22, 2009. Reach's soundtrack was available in digital formats the same day as the game's release on September 14, 2010; the physical two-disc soundtrack was released September 28, 2010.

On September 26, 2014, O'Donnell's soundtrack to Bungie's first installment of the Destiny franchise was released, several months after his termination from the company.

== Composition ==
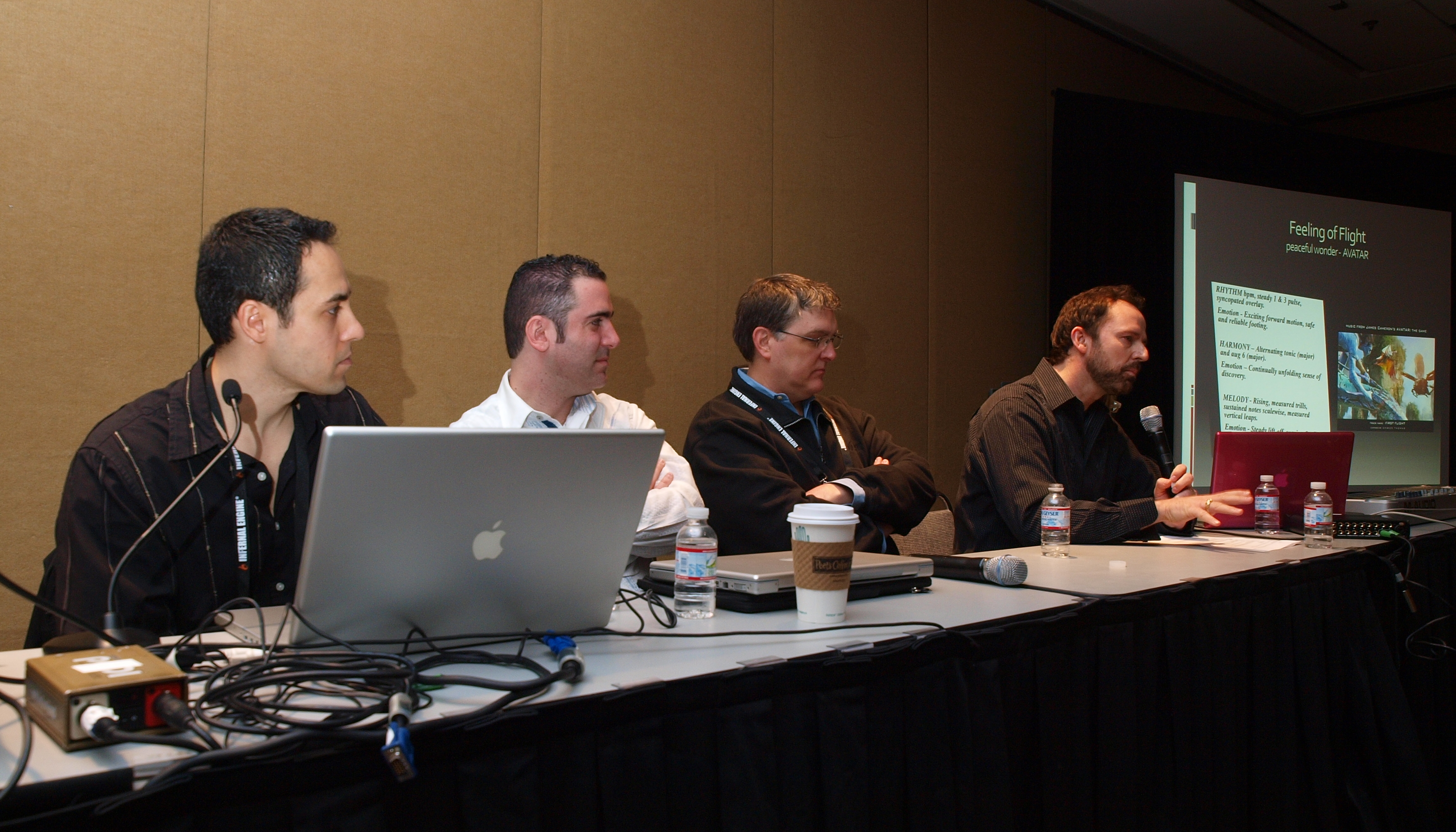
O'Donnell (second from right) at a Game Developers Conference 2010 talk on "The Musical Recipe of Emotion"

O'Donnell has used an Apple Macintosh computer for composition. In an interview O'Donnell wished that his software would easily upgrade to newer revisions; "for the last twenty years of technology, every time a 'new' version of something comes out, the old version gets trashed and I find myself unable to do something that I used to depend on," he said. O'Donnell was involved in the implementation of his music as well as the composition, and was Bungie's Audio lead. He composed at Bungie from a sound-proofed room in the corner of Bungie's office, dubbed the "Ivory Tower".

O'Donnell said in an interview that he feels that one problem with games is those that play music non-stop, which he feels detracts from the overall impact. Composers are forced to either write ambient music, he says, or very light music that is not emotionally driven, which he said is a detriment. O'Donnell prefers to write music towards the end of the development cycle, because he would rather score the final timing for things like cinematics and gameplay changes. O'Donnell credits part of the success of the Halo theme to his background writing jingles. For that music, O'Donnell had to make sure he could write music that would "get in people's heads" after 15 to 30 seconds. O'Donnell pushed Bungie to spend money on hiring singers and musicians to record the theme before Macworld as a way to present a strong showing.

Among the video game composers O'Donnell admires are Jeremy Soule, Jason Hayes, Koji Kondo, and Nobuo Uematsu, but he notes that he is older than most fellow game composers and that he was not directly influenced by them. Instead classical music by Beethoven, Brahms, and Barber and progressive rock groups like Jethro Tull and Genesis informed O'Donnell's taste and works. He lists Jerry Goldsmith, Lalo Schifrin, and Hans Zimmer among his favorite movie composers.

In addition to composition, O'Donnell also arranges his work. He created a special arrangement that was used for a Halo 3 segment of Video Games Live in London, after which O'Donnell appeared. He has also appeared with and without Salvatori at other shows featuring his music, including later Video Games Live tours and Play! A Video Game Symphony.

== Political career ==
O'Donnell is a self-described political conservative, and Bungie coworkers described him as the most right-leaning employee at the company.

In March 2024, O'Donnell announced on his Discord server his intention to run as a Republican Party candidate in Nevada's 3rd congressional district in the 2024 House of Representatives elections, challenging incumbent Democrat Susie Lee. A supporter of President Donald Trump, O'Donnell focused his campaign on supporting family values, strengthening the middle class, and border security. However, according to The Nevada Independent, O'Donnell had previously referred to Trump as an "idiot" in a 2016 social media post and stated that he "loathed" Trump in 2017, before later expressing support for him. He was defeated in the 2024 Republican primary, placing fourth behind Elizabeth Helgelien, Dan Schwartz, and Drew Johnson. In June 2026, O'Donnell, with Trump's endorsement, won the Republican primary for the 3rd congressional district and faced Lee in a highly competitive swing district in November. He lost the election to Lee by a margin of more than 20 points.

== Legal dispute with Bungie ==
In 2019, O'Donnell began uploading material related to Destiny and the unreleased orchestral suite Music of the Spheres to his YouTube channel and Bandcamp page, including an album titled "Sketches for MotS". Bungie served him with contempt of court papers in April 2021, arguing that his possession and distribution of the material violated the 2015 injunction. On July 12, 2021, Judge Regina Cahan of the Superior Court of Washington for King County ruled in Bungie's favor, ordering O'Donnell to submit his electronic devices for forensic examination, pay Bungie all revenue earned from the Bandcamp sales, and post a court-approved statement on his social media channels acknowledging he had no legal authority to possess or distribute the material. Bungie sought approximately $100,000 in legal fees, an amount O'Donnell's representatives described as unreasonable. O'Donnell posted the court-ordered statement in November 2021.

== Personal life ==
O'Donnell and his wife, Marcie, have two daughters. His children were part of a singing choir for the Flintstones Chewable Vitamins commercial jingle O'Donnell composed. His father did voice work for Myth as the "Surly Dwarf", as well as "The Prophet of Objection" in Halo 2.

Despite his extensive work with Bungie, O'Donnell remained co-owner and president of TotalAudio. In 2024, The Nevada Independent reported that O'Donnell has a net worth of nearly $74 million, much of which is held in stock holdings through individual retirement accounts and investment portfolios.

== Selected music projects for video games ==
Year	Name	Developer	Notes
1997	Riven	Cyan Worlds	Sound design
1997	Myth: The Fallen Lords	Bungie	Co-composer with Michael Salvatori and Paul Heitsch
1998	Myth II: Soulblighter	Bungie	Co-composer with Michael Salvatori
1999	Septerra Core: Legacy of the Creator	Valkyrie Studios	Co-composer with Michael Salvatori
2001	Oni	Bungie	Co-composer with Michael Salvatori, Paul Sebastien, Brian Salter
2001	Halo: Combat Evolved	Bungie	Co-composer with Michael Salvatori
2004	Halo 2	Bungie	Co-composer with Michael Salvatori
2007	Halo 3	Bungie	Co-composer with Michael Salvatori, C Paul Johnson
2009	Halo 3: ODST	Bungie	Co-composer with Michael Salvatori, C Paul Johnson, Stan LePard
2010	Halo: Reach	Bungie	Co-composer with Michael Salvatori, C Paul Johnson, Stan LePard, Ivan Ives
2014	Destiny	Bungie	Co-composer with Michael Salvatori, C Paul Johnson, Paul McCartney, Skye Lewin, Stan LePard
2014	Destiny: Music of the Spheres	Bungie	Co-composer with Michael Salvatori and Paul McCartney
2017	Echoes of the First Dreamer: The Musical Prequel to Golem	Highwire Games	
2019	Golem	Highwire Games	
