= Halo 2 Original Soundtrack =

Soundtrack for the video game Halo 2

Volumes One and Two

Soundtrack album by Various artists
- Released: November 9, 2004 (Vol. 1); April 25, 2006 (Vol. 2)
- Studios: Studio X, Seattle, Washington
- Genres: Rock; post-grunge; video game music
- Length: 69:20 (Vol. 1); 68:48 (Vol. 2)
- Label: Sumthing Else Music Works
- Producer: Nile Rodgers

The Halo 2 Original Soundtrack is the soundtrack for Bungie's 2004 video game Halo 2. The soundtrack was released as two separate volumes, released almost two years apart. Volume 1, released at the same time as Halo 2 on November 9, 2004, contains arranged instrumental pieces written by Martin O'Donnell and his partner Michael Salvatori, as well as "inspired-by" tracks from rock bands Incubus, Hoobastank and Breaking Benjamin. Volume 2 was released on April 25, 2006, and contains all the game music arranged in a suite form. Both volumes feature tracks from guitarist Steve Vai and the game's soundtrack was produced by Nile Rodgers.

O'Donnell, who had previously composed the music for Bungie games such as Myth and Halo: Combat Evolved, sought to develop the "Halo sound" of the previous game as well as introduce new sounds and influences to the music. The music was based on what was happening in the game, rather than using leitmotifs or theme repetitively. The music was recorded in pieces with a fifty-piece orchestra at Studio X in Seattle, Washington. To mark its release both Microsoft and Sumthing Else Music Works planned an aggressive marketing campaign.

Upon release, the music of Halo 2 was praised. Critics were split on the merits of Volume 1, with some publications enjoying the bonus offerings while others felt the first volume lacked cohesion. Volume 2 was declared the "real" orchestral soundtrack to Halo 2. Upon release both soundtracks became commercial successes, with more than 100,000 copies sold and Volume 1 became the first ever video game soundtrack to feature on the Billboard 200, peaking at the 162 position. The track "Blow Me Away" by Breaking Benjamin in Volume 1 was later released as a single and became platinum certified in the United States by the Recording Industry Association of America (RIAA) in 2021.

The soundtrack won several awards, including best soundtrack awards at the Game Audio Network Guild Awards, Game Developers Choice Awards, and was named Best Original Video Game Soundtrack by the Rolling Stone. The success of the soundtrack was pointed to as a sign of increasing legitimacy of video game music in the entertainment industry. Halo 2's music has since been played in concert settings, including Play! A Video Game Symphony and Video Games Live. The music was re-recorded and remixed for the 2014 remaster of the game, being released as Halo 2: Anniversary Original Soundtrack on November 11, 2014.

== Background ==
In the summer of 2004, Halo 2 composer Martin O'Donnell and album producer Nile Rodgers decided it would be a good idea to present Halo 2's music in two distinct volumes. The first volume would contain the game's themes that were finished and mixed as well as "inspired-by" offerings from other artists. The first volume was released alongside the video game as Volume 1 on November 9 of the same year. As the soundtrack was finished before all the in-game music was completed, none of the tracks written by O'Donnell appear in Halo 2 in the same arrangement. The bands featured in Volume 1, including Breaking Benjamin and Incubus, were enthusiastic about adding music to the soundtrack. Incubus was tapped to produce a suite of music which appears scattered throughout the soundtrack as four movements. Incubus guitarist Mike Einziger said that "Halo is the only video game that ever inspired us to write a whole suite [of music]."

The first pieces of music O'Donnell wrote for Halo 2 were promotional in nature; O'Donnell scored the cinematic announcement trailer for Halo 2 on August 2, 2002, and followed up with interactive music for the Electronic Entertainment Expo 2003 Halo 2 demo. O'Donnell confirmed that the chanting monks of Halo: Combat Evolved's choral theme, along with additional guitars by Steve Vai, would return in Halo 2. O'Donnell noted that the new setting of Africa prompted him to look at "Afro-Cuban" influences, but most of this type of music did not make it to the final product. Rather than write for locations or use leitmotifs for all the different characters in what O'Donnell called a "Peter and the Wolf approach to music", O'Donnell wrote "sad music for sad moments, scary music to score the scary bits and so forth." Recurring themes developed more by accident than planning. Recording of orchestrated music was completed over several sessions with the Northwest Sinfonia orchestra at Studio X in Seattle, Washington.

"The Last Spartan"
The piece used to accompany the 2002 announcement of Halo 2

Nile Rodgers produced both volumes of the soundtrack, in addition to writing and performing the track "Never Surrender" in collaboration with songwriter/remixer Nataraj. Rodgers himself is a video game player, noting in an interview that "30% to 40% of the [recording] budget was spent in downtime playing video games. Since all that money was going to that part of the recording session, I decided to figure out what was so compelling about it, and I got hooked [by the game]."

Due to legal issues, the second Halo 2 soundtrack containing the entire finished score, Volume 2, was not released until more than a year after the soundtrack had been mixed and mastered. The volume's music is formatted in a 'suite' structure that corresponds with the chapters within the game, in order to create a "music representation" of the video game. O'Donnell stated that this presentation of the music as a concept album was natural because the overall story and atmosphere of Halo 2 directly influenced the sound to begin with.

=== Halo 2: Anniversary Soundtrack ===
For the ten year anniversary of Halo 2 in 2014, the game along with its music was remastered in Halo 2: Anniversary, without original composers Martin O'Donnell and Michael Salvatori, both of whom were still at Bungie. Nearly all tracks in Volume 1 and Volume 2 were re-recorded or remixed with the San Francisco Symphony at Skywalker Sound studio. Guitarist Steve Vai returned to remake his two tracks, with Periphery guitarist Misha Mansoor covering and remaking the tracks written by Breaking Benjamin and Incubus in the original soundtrack. The Halo 2: Anniversary Original Soundtrack was released on November 11, 2014.

== Promotion ==
The first volume of the Halo 2 Original Soundtrack was specifically timed to coincide with the launch of the video game, to cash in on the "Halo effect"; players would go to buy the game and get the soundtrack and other merchandise by association. The first several million copies of the game sold all contained promotional inserts for the soundtrack. The soundtrack was seen as an integral part of the marketing and merchandise push Microsoft planned for Halo 2. The soundtrack's publisher, Sumthing Distribution, also planned and executed an aggressive marketing campaign, including special music listening stations and side-by-side soundtrack and game placement at participating retailers. The "Halo Theme MJOLNIR Mix", the first track on Volume 1, was released on November 22, 2007, as a free track for Guitar Hero III: Legends of Rock on the Xbox 360.

== Reception ==
Vol. 1
Review scores
Source	Rating
AllMusic	3.5/5 stars

Vol. 2
Review scores
Source	Rating
AllMusic	Positive
IGN	Positive

Upon release, the reaction to Halo 2's score was generally positive. Reception for the two soundtrack releases, however, varied. Volume 1's inclusion of other artists in addition to original music received both praise and criticism. Mike Brennan Soundtrack.net's review claimed that the inclusion of Hoobastank and Breaking Benjamin as well as Incubus made the soundtrack "more harsh" sounding but overall lacked cohesion. On the other hand, G4 TV found the four-part Odyssey by Incubus comprised "a progressive rock/fusion jam the likes of which haven't been recorded since the 1970s."

Nuketown.com declared that Volume 2 was the soundtrack that fans had been waiting for; other publications agreed, saying that it "feels like the real soundtrack to Halo 2". IGN found the soundtrack ultimately enjoyable, but felt that the more traditional orchestration that appeared in Halo 2 clashed with the ambient and electronic sounds that had appeared before, making the album "divided".

Overall, the Halo 2 soundtracks sold well. Volume 1 sold more than 100,000 copies, and peaked at the number 162 position of the Billboard 200, the first video game soundtrack to ever enter the chart. This compares favorably to typical movie soundtracks, which generally sell no more than 10,000 copies. The Halo 2 Original Soundtrack's success was pointed to as a sign of increasing legitimacy of video game music in the entertainment industry, which had graduated from "simple beeps" to complex melodies with big budgets. The second track in Volume 1, "Blow Me Away" by Breaking Benjamin, was later released as a single in 2010 by the band, becoming platinum certified in the United States with over 1 million sales by the Recording Industry Association of America (RIAA).

=== Awards ===
The Halo 2 Original Soundtrack received several awards, including the Game Developers Choice Award and Best Original Video Game Soundtrack from Rolling Stone. It won the Best Original Soundtrack awards at the 2005 G-Phoria Awards and 2005 Game Audio Network Guild Awards.

== Track listings ==
=== Volume 1 ===
Halo 2 Original Soundtrack: Volume 1
No.	Title	Music	Length
1.	"Halo Theme MJOLNIR Mix" (featuring Steve Vai)	O'Donnell; Salvatori	4:11
2.	"Blow Me Away"	Breaking Benjamin	3:25
3.	"Peril"	O'Donnell; Salvatori	2:46
4.	"Ghosts of Reach"	O'Donnell; Salvatori	2:22
5.	"Follow (1st Movement of The Odyssey)"	Incubus	4:15
6.	"Heretic, Hero"	O'Donnell; Salvatori	2:34
7.	"Flawed Legacy"	O'Donnell; Salvatori	1:58
8.	"Impend"	O'Donnell; Salvatori	2:21
9.	"Never Surrender" (featuring Steve Vai)	Nile Rodgers	3:35
10.	"Ancient Machine"	O'Donnell; Salvatori	1:38
11.	"2nd Movement of The Odyssey"	Incubus	7:40
12.	"In Amber Clad"	O'Donnell; Salvatori	1:39
13.	"The Last Spartan"	O'Donnell; Salvatori	2:18
14.	"Orbit of Glass"	O'Donnell; Salvatori	1:18
15.	"3rd Movement of The Odyssey"	Incubus	6:40
16.	"Heavy Price Paid"	O'Donnell; Salvatori	2:31
17.	"Earth City"	O'Donnell; Salvatori	3:06
18.	"High Charity"	O'Donnell; Salvatori	1:59
19.	"4th Movement of The Odyssey"	Incubus	9:07
20.	"Remembrance"	O'Donnell; Salvatori	1:17
21.	"Connected"	Hoobastank	2:39
Total length:			69:20

=== Volume 2 ===
All music is composed by Martin O'Donnell, Michael Salvatori.

Halo 2 Original Soundtrack: Volume 2
No.	Title		Length
1.	"Prologue"	1. "Rising" – 0:20; 2. "Cloistered Expectancy" – 0:25; 3. "Weight of Failure" – 1:50	2:35
2.	"Cairo Suite"	1. "Cold Blue Light" – 1:54; 2. "Waking Spartan" – 3:36; 3. "Jeweled Hull" – 2:03; 4. "Chill Exposure" – 2:09	9:42
3.	"Mombasa Suite"	1. "Metropole" – 1:29; 2. "Broken Gates" – 2:47; 3. "Encounter" – 2:25	6:41
4.	"Unyielding"		3:04
5.	"Mausoleum Suite"	1. "Destroyer's Invocation" – 4:36; 2. "Falling Up" – 1:49; 3. "Infected" – 1:16; 4. "Shudder" – 0:29	8:10
6.	"Unforgotten"		2:09
7.	"Delta Halo Suite"	1. "Penance" – 2:32; 2. "Wage" – 2:42; 3. "Leonidas" – 2:28; 4. "Dust and Bones" – 3:44	11:29
8.	"Sacred Icon Suite"	1. "Cortege" – 3:38; 2. "Opening Volley" – 0:28; 3. "Veins of Stone" – 3:20	7:26
9.	"Reclaimer" (featuring Steve Vai)		3:03
10.	"High Charity Suite"	1. "Rue and Woe" – 1:30; 2. "Respite" – 2:17; 3. "Antediluvia" – 2:22; 4. "Pursuit of Truth" – 2:18	8:29
11.	"Finale"	1. "Great Journey" – 1:15; 2. "Thermopylae Soon" – 1:55	3:10
12.	"Epilogue"	1. "Beholden" – 1:03; 2. "Road to Voi" – 2:19; 3. "Subsume" – 0:27	3:49
Total length:			68:48

== Personnel ==
All information is taken from the CD credits.

- Martin O'Donnell (ASCAP) – composer
- Michael Salvatori (ASCAP) – composer
- Simon James – concert master/contractor
- Christian Knapp – Northwest Sinfonia conductor
- Marcie O'Donnell – choir conductor
- Nile Rodgers – producer
- Nile Rodgers, Michael Ostin – music co-supervisors
- Lorraine McLees – album art director
