= Sumthing Distribution =

Defunct American distribution company

Sumthing Distribution, Inc.
- Company type: Private
- Industry: Music & entertainment
- Founded: 1998
- Defunct: January 3, 2019
- Headquarters: New York City, United States
- Key people: Nile Rodgers (founder and CEO); Andy Uterano (president)
- Products: Music & entertainment
- Website: sumthing.com

Sumthing Distribution was an American company founded by Nile Rodgers. A distribution company and independent label best known for releasing videogame soundtracks, it operated from 1998-2010.

== See also ==
- List of record labels
