= History of alternate reality games =

Alternate reality games are a modern genre of gaming often consisting of an interactive, networked narrative that uses the real world as a platform and employs transmedia storytelling to deliver a story that may be altered by players' ideas or actions. Most of these games are either independently run or used as a viral marketing campaign by a company or brand.

== Before 2001: Influences and precursors ==
=== Early examples of major ARGs or proto-ARGs prior to 2001 ===
Ong's Hat/Incunabula was most likely started sometime around 1993, and also included most of the aforementioned design principles. Ong's Hat also incorporated elements of legend tripping into its design, as chronicled in a scholarly work titled "Legend-Tripping Online: Supernatural Folklore and the Search for Ong's Hat". Some scholars disagree on the classification of the Ong's Hat story.

In 1996, Wizards of the Coast launched a proto-alternate reality game called Webrunner: The Hidden Agenda to promote their game Netrunner. It cast players as hackers through seven puzzle-themed "gates" to get the secret data ("agenda"). The popular game was the first online game tied into a product release, making the front page of The New York Times technology section. A sequel, Webrunner II: The Forbidden Code, followed on to promote the release of the Proteus expansion of the game.

Dreadnot was a (non-commercial) ARG produced with a grant from the San Francisco Chronicle and published on sfgate.com in 1996. It included most of the aforementioned design principles. The game included working voice mail phone numbers for characters, clues in the source code, character email addresses, off-site websites, real locations in San Francisco, real people (including then-Mayor Willie Brown), and of course a fictional mystery.

== The Beast and its influence ==
In 2001, in order to market the movie A.I.: Artificial Intelligence and a planned series of Microsoft computer games based on the film, Microsoft's creative director, Jordan Weisman, and another Microsoft game designer, Elan Lee, conceived of an elaborate murder mystery played out across hundreds of websites, email messages, faxes, fake ads, and voicemail messages. They hired Sean Stewart, an award-winning science-fiction/fantasy author, to write the story. The game, dubbed "the Citizen Kane of online entertainment" by Internet Life, was a runaway success that involved over three million active participants from all over the world during its run and would become the seminal example of the nascent ARG genre. An early asset list for the project contained 666 files, prompting the game's puppetmasters to dub it "the Beast", a name which was later adopted by players. A large and extremely active fan community called the Cloudmakers formed to analyze and participate in solving the game, and the combined intellect, tenacity and engagement of the group soon forced the puppetmasters to create new subplots, devise new puzzles, and alter elements of the design to keep ahead of the player base. Somewhat unusually for a computer-based game, the production engaged equal numbers of male and female participants, and drew players from a wide spectrum of age groups and backgrounds.

== 2002–2003: Community and genre growth ==
The years immediately after the Beast saw independent developers who had played it extend the form from a one-time occurrence to a new genre of gaming, and the formation of an ever-growing community devoted to playing, designing and discussing ARGs.

=== Grassroots development ===
Under the influence of the Beast and enthusiastic about the power of collaboration, several Cloudmakers came together with the idea that they could create a similar game. The first effort to make an independent Beast-like game, Ravenwatchers, failed, but another team soon assembled and would meet with success. With very little experience behind them, the group managed, after nine months of development, to create a viable game that was soon seized upon eagerly by the Cloudmakers group and featured in Wired magazine. As players of the Beast, members of the Lockjaw development team were extremely aware of the community playing the game and took steps to encourage the tight bonding of the player base through highly collaborative puzzles, weekly Euchre games, and the inclusion of player personas in the game. While the numbers never rivaled those of The Beast, with absolutely no funding or promotion, the game proved both that it was possible for developers to create these games without corporate funding or promotion, and that there was interest in the ARG form beyond a one-time audience for a production on the Beast's scale. Lockjaw marked the start of the ARG as a genre of gaming, rather than simply a one-time occurrence.

== 2004–2006: Massive-scale commercial games and mainstream attention ==
After the success of the first major entries in the nascent ARG genre, a number of large corporations looked to ARGs to promote both their products, and to add their companies' images by demonstrating their interest in innovative and fan-friendly marketing methods. To create buzz for the launch of the Xbox game Halo 2, Microsoft hired the team that had created the Beast, now operating independently as 42 Entertainment. The result, I Love Bees, departed radically from the website-hunting and puzzle-solving that had been the focus of the Beast. I Love Bees wove together an interactive narrative set in 2004, and a War Of The Worlds-style radio drama set in the future, the latter of which was broken into 30- to 60-second segments and broadcast over ringing payphones worldwide. The game pushed players outdoors to answer phones, create and submit content, and recruit others, and received as much or more mainstream notice than its predecessor, finding its way onto television during a presidential debate, and becoming one of The New York Times' catchphrases of 2004. A slew of imitators, fan tributes and parodies followed.

The following spring, Audi launched The Art of the Heist to promote its new A3. Roughly a year after I Love Bees, 42 Entertainment produced Last Call Poker, a promotion for Activision's video game Gun. Designed to help modern audiences connect with the Western genre, Last Call Poker centered around a working poker site, held games of "Tombstone Hold 'Em" in cemeteries around the United States—as well as in at least one digital venue, World of Warcraft's own virtual reality cemetery—and sent players to their own local cemeteries to clean up neglected grave sites and perform other tasks.

The 2005 videogame Advent Rising had a brief foray into the world of ARGs by launching the "Race to Save Mankind," which would reward the first person to find all hidden symbols within the game $1,000,000. This was later changed to winning several copies of the game instead due to technical issues.

== 2005–2006: The rise of the self-supporting ARG ==
The first major attempt (other than EA's failed Majestic) to create a self-supporting ARG was Perplex City, which launched in 2005 after a year's worth of teasers. The ARG offered a $200,000 prize to the first player to locate the buried Receda Cube and was funded by the sale of puzzle cards. The first season of the game ended in January 2007, when Andy Darley found the Receda Cube at Wakerly Great Wood in Northamptonshire, UK. Mind Candy, the production company, has also produced a board game related to the ARG and plans to continue it with a second season beginning March 1, 2007. Whether the model was a success is unknown at this time, although Mind Candy's acceptance of corporate sponsorship and venture capital suggests that the puzzle cards alone are not enough to fully fund the ARG at this time.

== 2006 onward: New developments ==
2006 produced less large-scale corporate ARGs than past years, but the ARG form continued to spread and be adapted for promotional uses, as an increasing number of TV shows and movies extended their universes onto the internet through such means as character blogs and ARG-like puzzle trails, and as an increasing number of independent/grassroots games launched, with varying levels of success. lonelygirl15, a popular series of videos on YouTube, relinquished an unprecedented amount of control to its audience by recognizing a fan-created game as the "official" ARG.

2007 got off to a strong start immediately, with Microsoft's Vanishing Point to promote the launch of Windows Vista. The game was designed by 42 Entertainment and, due in part to many large-scale real world events, such as a lavish show at the Bellagio Fountain in Las Vegas as well as a prizes of a trip into space and having a winner's name engraved on all AMD Athlon 64 FX chips for a certain period of time, received large media attention. It was followed almost immediately by a promotion, also rumored to be a 42 Entertainment production, for the release of the Nine Inch Nails album Year Zero, in which fans discovered leaked songs on thumb drives in washrooms at concerts. Monster Hunter Club, a promotion for the U.S. release of the movie The Host, launched by sending action figures and other items to prominent members of the ARG community. Perplex City concluded its first season by awarding a $200,000 prize to a player who found the game's missing cube.

=== Television tie-ins and "extended experiences" ===
Even before the development of the ARG genre, television sought to extend the reality of its shows onto the web with websites that treated the world as real, rather than discussing it as fiction. An early example was Fox's Freakylinks, developed by Haxan, creators of the Blair Witch Project, who would later go on to develop the well-known ARGs The Art of the Heist and Who Is Benjamin Stove. Freakylinks employed a website designed to look like it had been created by amateur paranormal enthusiasts to generate internet interest in the show, which gathered a cult following but was canceled after 13 episodes. In September 2002, following a successful initial foray into ARG-like territory with 2001's Alias web game, ABC brought alternate reality gaming more definitively to the television screen with the show Push, Nevada. Produced by Ben Affleck and Matt Damon, the show created a fictional city in Nevada, named Push. When advertising the show, they advertised the city instead, with billboards, news reports, company sponsors, and other realistic life-intruding forms. During each episode of the show, highly cryptic clues would be revealed on screen, while other hidden clues could be found on the city's website. Unfortunately, the show was cancelled mid-season, and all of the remaining clues were released to the public. Clever watchers eventually figured out that the show would still be paying out its $1 million prize during Monday Night Football. The last clue was revealed during half-time, prompting those fortunate enough to have solved the puzzle to call a telephone number. The first person to call received $1 million. In October 2004, the ReGenesis Extended Reality game launched in tandem with the Canadian television series ReGenesis. Clues and stories from the series sent players online to stop a bioterrorist attack.

In 2006, the TV tie-in ARG began to come into its own when there was a surge of ARGs that extended the worlds of related television shows onto the internet and into the real world. As with Push, Nevada, ABC led the way, launching three TV tie-in ARGs in 2006: Kyle XY, Ocular Effect (for the show Fallen) and The LOST Experience (for the show LOST). ABC joined with Channel 4 in the UK and Australia's Channel 7 in promoting a revamped web site for The Hanso Foundation. The site was focused on a fictitious company prevalent in the storyline of the TV series, and the game was promoted through television advertisements run during LOST episodes. Ocular Effect was launched in collaboration with Xenophile Media and Double Twenty Productions.

NBC followed suit in January 2007, beginning an ARG for its hit TV series Heroes launched through an in-game reference to the website for Primatech Paper, a company from the show, which turned out to be real. Text messages and emails led players who applied for "employment" at the site to secret files on the show's characters.

== See also ==
- List of alternate reality games
