= Urgent Evoke =

2010 Alternate Reality Game

Urgent Evoke (also known as Evoke) is an Alternate reality game created by Jane McGonigal and funded by the World Bank Institute, infoDev, the Korean Trust Fund on ICT for Development that ran from 3 March-12 May 2010. The game was designed to empower young people in Africa to come up with creative solutions to problems like hunger, water access, climate change, and poverty. The game's tagline was "A crash course in changing the world."

== Background ==
The game was developed after universities in Africa expressed a need to find avenues to encourage students to find innovative solutions and work within their local communities. The World Bank Institute invested $500,000, stating that they hoped to empower people to create local change by connecting them with contacts around the world.

The game was challenged by the lack of Internet access in Africa. The game addressed this by designing options for playing on mobile phones using the Opera Mini operating system, and the World Bank Institute ran ad campaigns in South Africa to recruit players.

== Gameplay and Story ==
Evoke ran for 10 weeks, beginning 3 March 2010 and concluding 12 May 2010. Each week, a new mission was introduced via a graphic novel installment written by Emmy Award nominated producer Kiyash Monsef and drawn by Jacob Glaser. The story was set in the year 2020 and followed the efforts of a mysterious network of Africa's best problem-solvers. Game designer Ken Eklund served as community lead.

== Results ==
The game reported 19,324 registered players from 150 countries who collectively submitted 23,500 blog posts, 4,700 photos, and 1,500 videos. The top 25 projects out of 74 submissions participated in an online challenge with GlobalGiving and raised $30,000 in additional funds. Of the players, there were 8,000 active participants, 400 of which were from Africa.

Players who completed enough missions could earn a certification from the World Bank Institute and some submitters were selected to attend the EVOKE Summit, a conference in Washington, DC on 28–30 September 2010.

The game is now available to high school teachers as an educational tool through the original Urgent Evoke website.
