= Adrian Hon =

English writer and game designer

- Born: August 1982 (age 43–44); England
- Education: Natural Sciences at University of Cambridge, University of Oxford, University of California, San Diego
- Occupations: Writer, game designer
- Writing career
- Notable works: Perplex City (2004), Zombies, Run! (2012)
- Website: mssv.net

Adrian Hon (born August 1982) is an English writer and game designer specializing in alternate reality games and transmedia storytelling. He is the CEO and founder of Six to Start, creator of the fitness game Zombies, Run!, and a non-fiction and sci-fi author.

Hon was lead producer and designer of the alternate reality game Perplex City at Mind Candy from 2004 to 2007.

== Mars Society ==
In 2001, at the age of 17, Hon delivered a TED talk on Mars exploration. He cofounded youth outreach program Generation Mars, served as the editor of the Mars Society's official online magazine and forum, and in 2002, spent two weeks at the Mars Society Desert Research Station.

== Alternate Reality Games ==
Hon became interested in alternate reality games in 2001 while working on a neuroscience degree at university.

In 2001, Hon was a co-moderator of the Cloudmakers, the discussion group for The Beast. At the end of the game, he wrote a 130-page walkthrough of The Beast and participated in the post-game debrief at Microsoft.

In 2004, he joined Mind Candy as their director of play. He produced the alternate reality game Perplex City, which ran from April 2005 to February 2007. Players solved puzzle cards to uncover the mystery of a missing artifact known as "The Cube" and competed for a real-life £100,000 prize.

For his work on Perplex City, Hon received one of the 2005 Origins Award winners, the "Vanguard Innovative Game Award", with Michael Acton Smith.

In 2022, Hon was featured in an NHK documentary Finding Satoshi about a long-running puzzle, "Billion to One", which was solved in December 2020 by Tom-Lucas Säger and Laura E. Hall.

== Six to Start ==
In 2007, Hon founded Six to Start with his brother Dan.

In September 2011, the Six to Start team, with writer Naomi Alderman, launched a Kickstarter for mobile exergame Zombies, Run!, a running game and audio adventure that uses a phone's GPS and accelerometer. Zombies, Run! was funded by a Kickstarter campaign which raised more than five times what was expected, a total of $72,627 from 3,464 backers in October 2011. Zombies, Run! became the highest-grossing Health & Fitness app on Apple's App Store within two weeks of its initial release.

Fast Company named Six to Start as one of their top 10 most innovative companies of 2013, describing Zombies, Run! as "one part audio book, one part video game, and one party sneaky personal trainer".

Six to Start and Alderman also created The Walk, a similar game to encourage increased physical activity throughout the day. The app was sponsored by the UK's National Health Service and Department of Health and was the first game to be funded so. In 2018 The Walk was turned into a podcast and released through Panoply Media.

In March 2021, digital fitness lifestyle company OliveX acquired Six to Start. Hon was appointed chief innovation officer at OliveX and serves as executive director for Six to Start.

== Writing ==
From 2010 to 2013, Hon wrote a regular column for The Telegraph. As of 2022, Hon is a monthly columnist for the print edition of EDGE magazine. He also contributed an entry to the SCP Wiki.

=== A History of the Future in 100 Objects (2013) ===
In 2013, Hon wrote A History of the Future in 100 Objects, an alternate history science fiction book looking back on the 21st century from the perspective of the year 2084. The book was the subject of a 2017 art exhibition for the Shanghai Project by artist Chen Xi, curated by Yongwoo Lee and Hans Ulrich Obrist.

In 2020, MIT Press published a new edition of A History of the Future in 100 Objects with fifteen new chapters and three revised chapters.

=== You've Been Played (2022) ===
In 2020, Hon wrote a viral Twitter thread and follow-up post comparing conspiracy theory QAnon to a video game designed to hook consumers.

Hon released You've Been Played: How Corporations, Governments, and Schools Use Games to Control Us All in 2022, about the development and use of gamification.
