= End of Night =

End of (the) night may refer to:

- Dawn, the beginning of morning twilight

== Arts and media ==
=== Films ===
- Nishant (film) (English: Night's End), a 1975 Hindi film directed by Shyam Benegal
- The End of the Night, a 1989 Italian film directed by Davide Ferrario
- At the End of the Night, a 2003 Italian film directed by Salvatore Piscicelli

=== Literature ===
- The End of Night (book), 2013 book by Paul Bogard

=== Songs ===
- "End of the Night", a 1967 song by The Doors
- "End of Night" (song), a 2013 song by Dido

=== Television ===
- "End of Nights", an episode of the television series Sanctuary

== Other uses ==
- Nishant (name), a common Indian male given name, literally meaning "end of night"

== See also ==
- Journey to the End of the Night (disambiguation)
