= The Lost Ring =

The Lost Ring was an alternate reality game (ARG) initiated by McDonald's, as part of their marketing for the 2008 Olympic Games in Beijing, China. A co-production between McDonald's, AKQA, and Jane McGonigal, the game was notable for its global scope: taking place across six continents, in seven languages, and running for six months (29 February – 24 August 2008). It began with six amnesiac athletes with strange tattoos, and culminated in the "revival" of a fictional Ancient Olympic sport – which the narrative described as having disappeared 2000 years ago before the events of the game.

== The game ==
The game began with packages being received by 50 bloggers and experienced ARG players on 29 February (Leap Day). The packages contained memorabilia from the 1920 Summer Olympics in Antwerp, and a ball of yarn (or clew). The following dates and messages were written on the back of commemorative postcards: March 3, 2008: Find her...; March 4, 2008: Find the others...; March 5, 2008: Find him...; March 11, 2008: Find the secret...; August 24, 2008: Save the world. Inside the ball of yarn was a small piece of paper with the message: You will soon discover an alternate reality. The adventure begins when you meet Ariadne. www.findthelostring.com.

Over the first week of March, www.findthelostring.com was populated with blogs for "her" (Ariadne) and "the others" (Lucie, Markus, Noriko, Mei Hui, Larissa and Diego), each in a different language: English, French, German, Japanese, Mandarin, Portuguese and Spanish. This was accompanied by a website for "him" (Eli Hunt) at www.thelostgames.com, and "the secret" at http://164.109.150.213 (no longer active) – which contained a mysterious spinning sphere which appeared to be the earth at night. Alongside these, a site was discovered at www.thelostring.com which contained movie-style trailers (made by PostPanic in Amsterdam) and links to the blogs and Lost Games site. The web-based side of the game was played out across these websites, accompanied by communication with the characters via email, Twitter and instant messaging.

Just as the scope of the online content was global and multilingual, so was the breadth of The Lost Ring's offline tasks. For starters, 27 chapters of the "Codex of the Lost Ring" had to be recovered from 27 cities across the globe. In a number of cases there were no active players in that city, and it was up to the player community to recruit strangers to do the pick-up. The codex provided instructions for the "Lost Sport", which the players formed teams, trained and eventually competed in. Five sculpted metal rings were located and then collected (through increasingly difficult tasks) in Wellington, Tokyo, London, Buenos Aires and Marfa (Texas). On multiple occasions players physically met with characters – at Lost Sport training sessions, to hand over clues, and in order to ambush and interrogate one of "The Opposition" (which was webcast live for other players).

The climax of the game involved all of the characters travelling to Beijing for the last week of the Summer Olympics, where their activities were captured in a series of videos. The week culminated in a simultaneously run Lost Sport competition, with teams racing in Beijing, Tokyo, Wellington, San Francisco, Salvador and London.

== The story of "The Lost Ring" ==
The Lost Ring focuses on six amnesiacs who woke up, blindfolded, in labyrinths around the world. They found each other through blogs and Flickr, and worked with players to discover the reasons for their memory loss and the meaning of the mysterious tattoo each bore on their left forearms, reading "Trovu la ringon perditan" – "Find the Lost Ring" in Esperanto.

Meanwhile, historian Eli Hunt began posting a series of podcasts on ancient Olympic mysteries on his website.

== Ancient Strengths ==
One of the centerpieces of the game was the legend of six ancient strengths based on the Values in Action Inventory of Strengths. Players were assigned a primary and a secondary strength based on a questionnaire. The strengths were

- Sofia: Wisdom, creativity, and cleverness. A knowledge seeker and labyrinth engineer.
- Thumos: Courage, energy, and determination. An adventurer and labyrinth runner.
- Chariton: Heart, humanity, and charm. A connector and team coach.
- Dikaiosune: Leadership, direction, and focus. A pilot and team captain. Symbolized by a blue feather, those with this strength are noted for being strong leaders and organizers. Ariadne led this strength.
- Sophrosune: Balance, self-control, and an open mind. An advisor and referee.
- Mythopoeia: Optimism, vision, and artistry. A truth finder and social media journalist.
