= WWO (disambiguation) =

WWO is a Polish hip hop group.

WWO or wwo may also refer to:

- World Without Oil, an American alternate reality game
- WWO, the National Rail station code for West Worthing railway station, West Sussex, England
- wwo, the ISO 639-3 code for Dorig language, Vanuatu
