= Zombies, Run! =

2012 video game

- Official logo
- Developer: Six to Start
- Publisher: Six to Start
- Producer: Adrian Hon
- Artist: Kas Sweeney
- Writers: Naomi Alderman; Rebecca Levene
- Composer: Mark Pittam
- Platforms: iOS, Android, Apple Watch
- Release: iOS: WW: February 27, 2012; Android, Windows Phone: WW: June 15, 2012
- Genres: Location-based game, Fitness Game
- Mode: Single player

Zombies, Run! is a 2012 mobile fitness game co-developed and published by British studio Six to Start and Naomi Alderman for iOS and Android platforms. Set around Abel Township, a small outpost trying to survive the zombie apocalypse, players act as the character "Runner 5" through a series of missions during which they run, collect items to help the town survive and listen to various audio narrations to uncover mysteries.

The storyline of the game is written primarily by Naomi Alderman and a team of writers, with guest contributions by notable science fiction authors such as Margaret Atwood, Elizabeth Bear, Joanne Harris and Andrea Phillips. The game was funded by a Kickstarter campaign which raised more than five times what was expected, a total of $72,627 from 3,464 backers. Additional season expansions have been released annually. In October 2012, Zombies, Run! 5k Training, a spin-off app designed as a "couch to 5k" training program, was released.

Zombies, Run! became the highest-grossing Health & Fitness app on Apple's App Store within two weeks of its initial release, and has drawn praise for the way its immersive storyline makes running more fun and academic attention for its genre and mHealth applications.

== Gameplay ==
Zombies, Run! is an immersive running game. Players act as the character "Runner 5" through a series of missions, during which they run and listen to various audio narrations to uncover the story, between listening to music from their own playlists. While running, the player collects supplies which can be used to benefit the base camp of Abel Township. The app is hands-free while the player runs and items are automatically collected. The app can record the distance, time, pace, and calories burned on each mission through the use of the phone's GPS or accelerometer. When using the GPS feature, the user can also opt to participate in a zombie chase which requires the player to run faster (at least 10% faster—a form of interval training) for a short period of time or be caught by zombies and lose their supplies. The app has 23 missions for season 1. Season 1 focuses on the player's arrival and acceptance at Abel Township and Abel's rivalry with New Canton, a larger outpost which treats its citizens harshly. Season 2 was released in April 2013, and has over 60 missions. Season 3 was released in April 2014, and has 40 missions. Season 4 was released in May 2015 with 40 missions, when the game became free-to-play. Season 5 was released in April 2016, with 40 missions. Season 6 was released in April 2017, with 40 more missions. Season 7 was released in April 2018, with another 40 missions. Season 8 was released in May 2019, adding 30 missions to the game. Each mission typically lasts from 35 minutes to an hour.

=== Additional modes ===
In addition to the standard "Season" missions, which advance the central story, several additional modes have been introduced. These include virtual races, radio mode, and airdrop and supply missions.

==== Virtual races ====
The first special "virtual race" event was released in October 2015. For an additional cost of $40 entry, entrants received exclusive training missions, a race mission, private forums, and prizes such as a medal, a running bib, etc., with all results recorded (anonymously if desired) on global leaderboards. Entrants were required to complete a 5k and/or a 10k run between specific dates. The virtual race missions remained available to entrants to run again, but runs taking place after the event window aren't recorded on the global leaderboards. Players created over 200 real-world meet-ups for the virtual race. The next virtual race took place in March–April 2016.

Six to Start now release a virtual race every Spring and Autumn. The associated stories all take place before or during Season 1, so as not to introduce spoilers for entrants who have not yet completed all seasons. The format usually includes two "training" missions, whose stories gives background and context to the actual race mission, and emails giving further background, often containing links to specially created augmented reality game in-universe websites or phone lines. For example, the autumn 2016 virtual race centred around recovering a flu vaccine. Entrants received an in-game 'leaked' email outlining practices of the corporation that had created the vaccine, and a telephone number contained in the email worked, containing recorded messages about the corporation. One of the training missions centred around creating a biometrically coded T-shirt in order to bypass the corporation's security systems.

Six to Start has released 15 virtual races, which include:

Race Period	VR	Title	Training Missions
Oct 30 - Nov 11, 2015	1	Run for Abel	None
Mar 30 - Apr 11, 2016	2	Nuclear Threat	2
Oct 20 - Nov 1, 2016	3	The Xia-Hifa Heist	2
Apr 7 - Apr 18, 2017	4	European Rescue Force	2
Oct 20 - Nov 3, 2017	5	Halloween!	2
Apr 19 - Apr 30, 2018	6	Tactical Zombie Division	2
Oct 18 - Nov 15, 2018	7	Tomorrow Island	2
Apr 25 - May 7, 2019	8	Train to Oban	2
Oct 24 - Nov 11, 2019	9	Escape from Runaway Fairground	2
Apr 29 - May 19, 2020	10	The Abel Manor Murders	2
Oct 7 - Oct 22, 2020	11	Die Rise	2
2021	12	Jack & Eugene's World Tour (3 Parts)	6
Spring 2022	13	Runners of the Round Table	2
Halloween 2022	14	Death Wish	2
Spring 2023	15	Cape Wrath	2

Six to Start spun the virtual races concept off into a separate app called Racelink, where participants listen to audio while participating in a charity race remotely. Racelink was closed down on December 10, 2019. Most of those virtual races have been incorporated into the Zombies, Run! app as New Adventures.

==== Airdrop and supply missions ====
An 'airdrop' feature was released where the player sets a real-world location to run to, and the app creates a mission that will last the distance needed. Supply missions allow the runner to gather additional supplies to be used for the in-app Home Base feature.

==== The Home Front ====
In 2020, a series of 35 workout missions designed to be done at home was released as a reaction to the lockdown during the COVID-19 pandemic. The series is also available in German as The Home Front Deutsch. The workout missions combine classic bodyweight exercises such as Squats, Lunges, Sit-Ups, Jumping Jacks, High Knees, and Chair Dips.

=== Home base mechanics ===
The supplies collected while running can be used between missions to enhance a small version of Abel Township, with detailed buildings similar to SimCity. The more runs the player goes on, the more supplies they collect. They can use those supplies to expand their Abel Township base and unlock more missions. Players start with three level one buildings: Janine's farmhouse, an armory, and a defense tower, which are all surrounded by a fence. As a player runs, supplies are picked up to build new structures or improve structures. Each structure has some type of bonus attached to it.

Expanding the base reflects the player's dedication to their exercise, and the more the player exercises, the larger and better-equipped the base becomes. Expanding the base can influence story events and availability of missions.

== Development ==
The game was conceived when writer Alderman attended a running class, during which the instructor asked attendees why they wanted to run, and one answered, "I want to be able to out run the zombie horde." The game was funded by a Kickstarter campaign which raised more than five times what was expected, a total of $72,627 from 3,464 backers in October 2011. Developer Hon described the gameplay's aim as being more role-playing than gamification. The developers' aim in creating Zombies, Run! was partially to make use of the features of a smartphone such as GPS and the gyroscopes, creating a game that could only be played on a smartphone. Although the game uses GPS and the accelerometer, these are to estimate distance, not track location, and Zombies, Run! has been described as "one of the few actual distance-based games". Zombies Run! does not have as much quantification of data as other exercise apps do, and Alderman regards their decision not to consult professional help in design as a strength, arguing that much of Zombies, Run!'s uniqueness comes from that lack of professional involvement. The team were trained in Objective C for iOS and the player character, Runner 5, was designed to be genderless. Stories were written with generic landmarks included to give a sense of place, and to encourage the player to identify their own local landmarks as being what the characters are talking about. The story was designed to be episodic, more like a TV show or a novel than a film.

The story is written by a team. Alderman is the head writer and co-creator. Staff writers include Rebecca Levene, Andrea Klassen, Kayt Lackie, Grant Howitt, Mathilda Gregory and Gavin Inglis. Several guest authors who are notable in speculative fiction and video games, such as Margaret Atwood, Joanne Harris, Elizabeth Bear, and Andrea Phillips, have contributed missions. A fan fiction author contributed ten missions for season 2.

In June 2012, Zombies, Run! expanded onto Android and Windows Phone. Windows Phone support ceased in December 2012.

For the release of season 2, the team rewrote the apps, added in a lot of new features and changed their behavior, which led to backlash from some players. As of May 2015, Zombies, Run! became free-to-play. At this time, between 15 and 20% of all purchasers were still playing the game. Existing players were given access to all content up until the end of Season 3 and the Interval Training and Race Missions features. Existing players can also unlock one episode of Season 4 for free per week, and have a discounted rate on "Pro Membership" subscription. New players get part of Season 1 for free, and can unlock a new episode every week. As of November 2015, Zombies, Run! is available on the Apple Watch. A spin-off game for the Apple Watch is in development, codenamed Overwatch.

== Seasons ==
Episode count
Release date	Season	Story missions	Side missions
Feb 27, 2012	1	23	
Apr 16, 2013	2	45	Side Missions: 16 Halloween Missions: 3
Apr 16, 2014	3	60	
May 12, 2015	4	40	Side Missions: 2
Apr 20, 2016	5	40	
Apr 26, 2017	6	40	
Apr 26, 2018	7	40	
May 15, 2019	8	30	
Apr 13, 2021	9	30	Side Missions: 5
Mar 29, 2023	10	30	
Dec 2, 2024	11	15	
May 6, 2026	12	8	

=== Plot, important points, and characters ===
- Alice Dempsey was the immediate past runner 5 before you became Runner 5. Under Sam Yao's time as a radio controller, there were also two other Runner 5s before Alice.
- Evan Deaubl is runner #7 and head of runners.
- Sarah Smith is runner #8. She was at a military base 5 months after the outbreak.
- Jack Holden – the co-host of Radio Abel; has a great relationship with his mother but she is disappointed that she will not have a grandchild. His preference anti-zombie weapon is WG, a cricket bat. Jack Holden produced the "This Zombie Life" program which is a pastiche/homage of WBEZ's This American Life hosted by Ira Glass.
- Eugene Ben Woods – the co-host of Radio Abel; he was in for a week in London to do an article about pop up restaurants; missing an entire leg; met Jack at a rave 3-days into the Zombie outbreak. Told Jack "Come with me if you want to live."
- Radio Abel – a radio station from Abel Township and its alternative call sign is WNYZ. The alternative frequency is 5200 kHz.
- ROFL Net – is a radio-based network that stands for Radio Operated Freeform Link as a network recovery effort, not a "network resurrection effort". It is a low-tech version of the Internet using ASCI character to transmit pictures of funny cats. It contains emails and text-based sites such as Wikipedia and Survivor's Bible.
- Dr. Maxine Meyers – a medical doctor, who put an ad on Radio Abel for help in the hospital – 1 pair of clean socks for 4 hours of grunt work and she is looking for staff who can suture a wound better than a competent 4-year-old child. Abel Township's Hospital's motto is "Abel Hospital: What heals you"
- Z-bay – a ROFL net trading and sell site based out of Norwood and named in reference to eBay but with more zombie-related issues
- Sam Yao – radio controller of the Abel Township runners. Before the series, he was a "really, really, really" bad 4th year engineering student, who only was doing it due to family pressure.
- Jodie is runner #4.
- Father Michael – a preacher on Season One radio call-in show, who believed that the zombie plague was engineered because: 1-month before, the outbreak government buildings has their water supply switched to private water; 6-months before the outbreak, oil tankers were diverted; 2-days before the outbreak, there was a teleconference of the Emergency Action Committee with a 3-hour notice before the meeting.

== Reception and legacy ==
=== Commercial reception ===
Zombies, Run! became the highest-grossing Health & Fitness app on Apple's App Store within two weeks of its initial release. As of 2014, Zombies, Run! had over 750,000 players.

Pocket Gamer regarded the "compelling narrative" of Zombies, Run! as being a way to trick the player into exercising. Zombies, Run! has a score of 71 on Metacritic, averaging 5 reviews. USA Today said of the story "If you're a fan of radio, zombie stories or need an extra push to get fit this year, Zombies, Run! excels in concept and execution." Caelainn Hogan writing for the Washington Post noted that she was interested in using the app weeks after beginning. Mur Lafferty, writing for the Escapist, also noted that it was fun to follow the story in the app, and therefore Lafferty sustained running. The base-building feature has been regarded as a good way to sustain interest in the game when not running. Fast Company named Six to Start as one of their top 10 most innovative companies of 2013, describing Zombies, Run! as "one part audio book, one part video game, and one party sneaky personal trainer". Rachel Shatto of Curve magazine praised the app, noting that the strong acting and good storyline made the app accessible to people who weren't "zombiephiles". Rick Broida, writing for CNET, was not engaged by Zombies, Run!, finding the dissonance between the urgent radio clips and his upbeat track list distracting. Zombies, Run! was shortlisted for the Design Museum's Design of the Year Award in 2013. Maureen Halushak, an experienced runner who writes for The Globe and Mail, "struggled to suspend [her] disbelief" when running. Halushak noted that the app was more about using the player's imagination than "pushing [the player] to the limit", citing the low frequency of zombie chases.

=== Health applications ===
Zombies Run! has drawn academic attention for its genre and mHealth applications. In a discussion of the trend to use audiobooks while exercising, Zombies, Run! has been discussed as "pushing the audiobook towards new forms", as the audiobook is embedded in other digital media as well as the activity of running. Kelly Gardner notes that Zombies, Run! relies on audio to create an apocalyptic environment. Martin French and Gavin Smith regard Zombies, Run! to be an example of the trend for the gamification of health surveillance, which makes tracking one's progress rewarding. A paper in The American Journal of Medicine compared Zombies, Run! with other popular health and fitness apps. It noted that the aim of the app was to increase aerobic exercise, that it included audio cues, exercise monitoring, the option to share on Facebook or Twitter, integration with the user's music playlist, a narrative, progression, the ability to sync with other apps, and tailored feedback. It recommended Zombies, Run! for healthy patients wanting to begin aerobic exercise.

A study of 51 teens studied the use of Zombies, Run! 5K Training, Get Running-Couch to 5k, or a control. It found that fitness did not significantly improve between the app groups and the control after the experiment, but that the app groups intended to continue using their apps and that the Zombies, Run! 5K Training app had positive feedback on the storyline and ability to track progress.

A twelve-week study was performed with the use of Zombies, Run!, The Walk, or a control group. 39 participants chose between Zombies, Run! and The Walk based on their interest in the app. All participants had their activity tracked with the Moves app. It was found that in the groups using either Zombies, Run! or The Walk, activity decline due to returning to an academic schedule after summer holidays was not as great as in the control group.

Knöll et al. considered Zombies, Run! to be an important contribution to urban exergaming due to its commercial success and the "innovative" way that the app makes the player exercise harder.

It was noted that players found the approach of the game compelling, and that it changed their attitudes to exercising and finding routes to run, but that there could be more integration with the player's real world—an example was given of a player who was caught by zombies while waiting at a traffic intersection.

=== Literary criticism ===
Astrid Ensslin and Alice Bell examine this work as a piece of electronic literature, noting this as an example of a way to merge a story world and with a real world experience.

=== Exhibits ===
This work was exhibited at the British Library 2023.

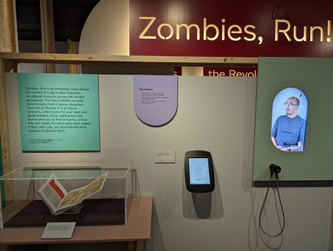
Zombies Run, exhibit at the British Library 2023

== Spin-offs ==
In October 2012, Zombies, Run! 5k Training, a spin-off app designed as a "couch to 5k" training program was released. The 5K training has 25 workouts to be run over 8 weeks, lasting approximately 40 minutes each. The trainings start the player off slowly and have been designed by experts, and the game can be used with a treadmill. In the storyline, the 5k training takes place between the first and second mission of season one. Advice on exercises, like heel lifts, is included with the app, and it does not include the 'zombie chase' feature or the base-building feature.

A board game spinoff was launched for crowdfunding on Kickstarter in September 2016. It was fully funded in two days and the board games were released in December 2017.

This game was featured in the British Library's Digital Storytelling Exhibit, 2023.

=== The Walk ===
Six to Start and Alderman also created The Walk, a similar game to encourage increased physical activity throughout the day. The app was sponsored by the UK's National Health Service and Department of Health and was the first game to be funded so. In 2018 The Walk was turned into a podcast and released through Panoply Media.

=== Dustland Runner ===
In March 2021 OliveX acquired Zombies, Run! developer Six to Start. Dustland Runner was released in March 2022 and is a move-to-earn fitness app built on the same game engine and play mechanics as Zombies, Run that rewards players by combining crypto and blockchain elements.

In 2026, Naomi Alderman bought back Zombies, Run! after the app had entered a period of decline under OliveX ownership, during which most of the original team had reportedly been laid off and new episodes were placed on indefinite hiatus. The relaunched app returned with an eight-part story chapter titled Back from the Dead, featuring returning voice actors and characters from the existing series, with further plans including smartwatch support for audio playback.

== See also ==
- Hyperreality
- Location-based game
- Magic Circle (virtual worlds)
- Run for Your Lives (obstacle racing) – a zombie-themed obstacle course race
- Activity tracker
