= Matt Wolf =

Matt Wolf may refer to:

- Matt Wolf (video game designer)
- Matt Wolf (filmmaker)
