= PXC =

PXC may mean:

- Perplex City, an Alternate Reality Game by Mind Candy
- A line of noise-cancelling headphones by Sennheiser
- Photonic Cross Connect, a type of optical cross-connect device that switches optical signals in a fiber optic network
- Plataforma per Catalunya, PxC, a Spanish political party.
