= Jane McGonigal =

American game designer and author (born 1977)

- Born: October 21, 1977 (age 49); Philadelphia, Pennsylvania, U.S.
- Education: Fordham University (BA); University of California, Berkeley (MA, PhD)
- Occupations: Game designer, game researcher
- Spouse: Kiyash Monsef (m. 2005)
- Relatives: Kelly McGonigal (twin)
- Website: janemcgonigal.com

Jane McGonigal (born October 21, 1977) is an American author, game designer, and researcher. McGonigal is known for her game Jane the Concussion Slayer and her role as Director of Game Research and Development at Institute for the Future.

McGonigal received her Ph.D. in Performance Studies from the University of California, Berkeley in 2006, where she was the first in the department to study computer and video games. She has worked on several notable alternate reality games, including I Love Bees (2004) and World Without Oil (2007), as well as designing SuperBetter (2012). After suffering a severe concussion in 2009, she created Jane the Concussion Slayer as a therapeutic game, which evolved into SuperBetter, a platform designed to help people build resilience and achieve personal goals.

She is the author of three books: Reality Is Broken: Why Games Make Us Better and How They Can Change the World (2011), which argues that games contribute to human happiness and can address social problems; SuperBetter: A Revolutionary Approach to Getting Stronger, Happier, Braver, and More Resilient (2015); and Imaginable: How to See the Future Coming and Feel Ready for Anything (2022). McGonigal has been called "the current public face of gamification," though she has expressed reservations about the term. She has been recognized by MIT's Technology Review as one of the world's top innovators under 35 and named to O: The Oprah Magazine's 2010 Power List.

== Early years and education ==
McGonigal was brought up in New Jersey. Her parents are teachers who emphasized intellectual attainment. Her identical twin sister, Kelly McGonigal, is a psychologist.

McGonigal received her Bachelor of Arts in English from Fordham University in 1999, and her Ph.D. in Performance Studies from the University of California, Berkeley in 2006. She was the first in the department to study computer and video games.

== Personal life ==
In 2009, she suffered a debilitating concussion that helped her develop a game, Jane the Concussion Slayer, for treating her concussion and other similar conditions; the game was later renamed SuperBetter.

== Philosophy ==
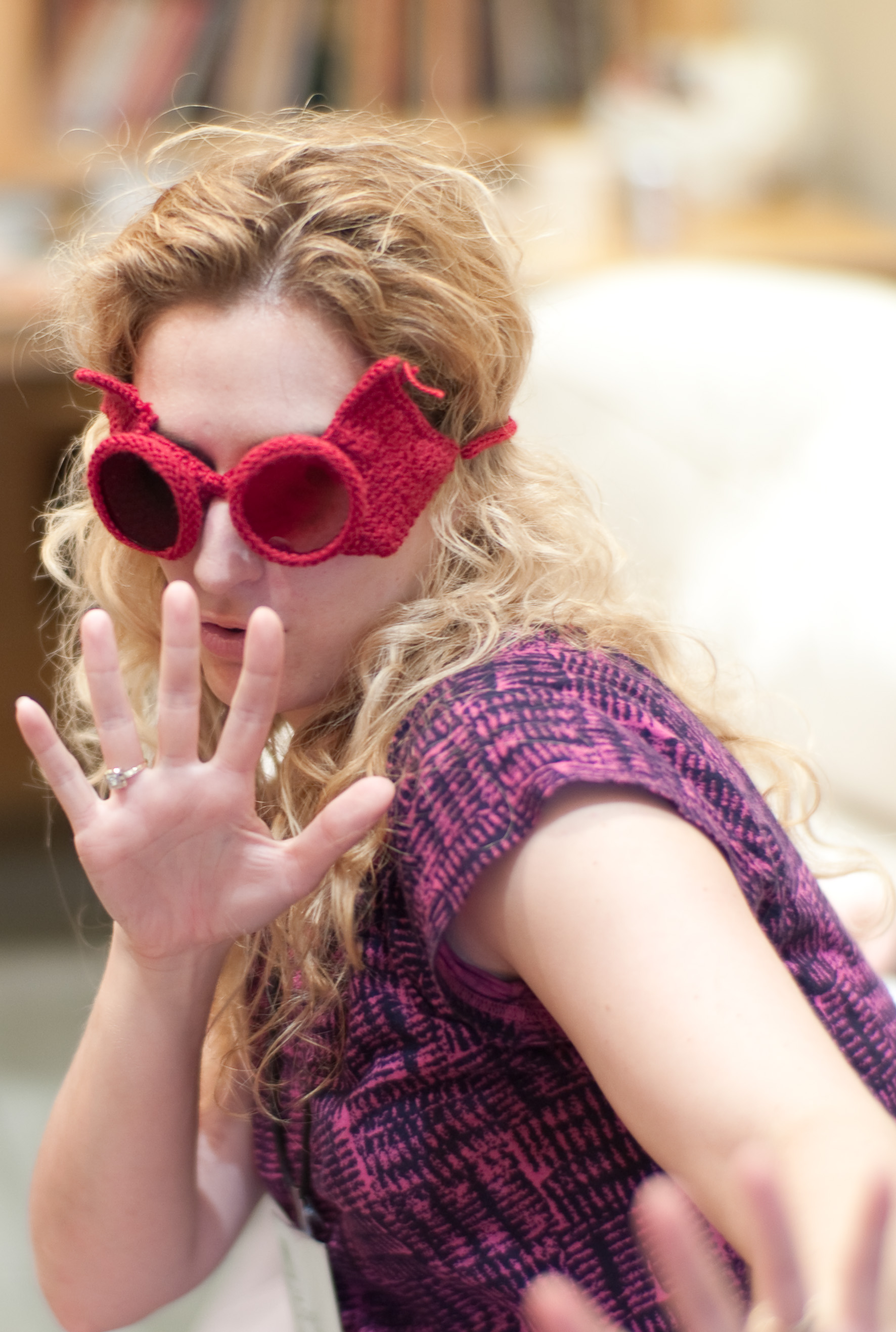
McGonigal at Foo Camp in 2009

McGonigal writes and speaks about alternate reality games and massively multiplayer online gaming. She also writes about the way that collective intelligence can be generated and used as a means for improving the quality of human life or working towards the solution of social ills. She has stated that gaming should be moving "towards Nobel Prizes."

McGonigal has been called "the current public face of gamification." Despite this, McGonigal has objected to the word, stating, "I don't do 'gamification,' and I'm not prepared to stand up and say I think it works. I don't think anybody should make games to try to motivate somebody to do something they don't want to do. If the game is not about a goal you're intrinsically motivated by, it won't work."

== Career ==
After earning her Bachelor of Arts in English, McGonigal started developing her first commercial games. As a designer, McGonigal became known for location-based and alternate reality games. She has taught game design and game studies at the San Francisco Art Institute and the University of California, Berkeley.

In 2008, she became the Director of Game Research and Development at Institute for the Future, and in 2012, the Chief Creative Officer at SuperBetter Labs.

=== Games ===
McGonigal has been developing commercial games since 2006, some of which are listed in the following chart:

Year	Title	Organization	Credit
2012	SuperBetter	SuperBetter Labs	Chief Creative Officer
2011	Find the Future: The Game	New York Public Library	Director
2010	Evoke	World Bank Institute	Creator
2009	Cryptozoo	American Heart Association	Director
2008	Top Secret Dance-Off		Creator (under pseudonym Punky McMonsef)
2008	Superstruct	Institute for the Future	Director
2008	The Lost Ring	McDonald's and The Lost Sport	Director
2007	World Without Oil	ITVS Interactive	Participation architect w/ Ken Eklund
2006	Cruel 2 B Kind		Concept and design w/ Ian Bogost
2005	Last Call Poker	42 Entertainment	Live Events Lead
2005	PlaceStorming		
2004	I Love Bees	42 Entertainment	Community Lead/PuppetMaster
2004	Demonstrate		
2004	TeleTwister		

==== SuperBetter ====
In July 2009, Jane suffered a concussion after hitting her head in her office. The symptoms were severe and lasted for several weeks. They made her feel suicidal. She requested her friends to give her tasks to do each day.

Wanting to recover from her condition, she created a game to treat it. The game was initially called Jane the Concussion-Slayer (after Buffy the Vampire Slayer), then renamed SuperBetter. McGonigal raised $1 million to fund an expanded version of the game. Additionally, she has collaborated on commissioned games for the Whitney Museum of American Art and the Museum of Contemporary Art, Los Angeles.

== Books ==
On January 20, 2011, McGonigal's first book, Reality Is Broken: Why Games Make Us Better and How They Can Change the World, discusses gaming, massively multiplayer online gaming and alternate reality games. Using current research from the positive psychology movement, McGonigal argues that games contribute to human happiness and motivation, a sense of meaning, and community development.

The book was met with a favorable reception from The Los Angeles Times and Wired and mixed reviews from The Independent. The book received criticism from some quarters, notably the Wall Street Journal, which felt that her thesis—which claimed to use games to "fix" everyday life by giving it a sense of achievement and making it seem more fulfilling and optimistic—made "overblown" claims from minor examples, and did not address conflicting individual goals and desires, or the influence of "evil." The New York Times Book Review also criticized some points in her book, citing the lack of evidence demonstrating that in-game behavior and values could translate into solutions to real-world problems such as poverty, disease, and hunger.

On September 15, 2015, McGonigal's second book, SuperBetter: A Revolutionary Approach to Getting Stronger, Happier, Braver, and More Resilient, was published by Penguin Press. It was #7 on the New York Times Best Seller: Advice, How-to, and Miscellaneous List its debut week.

McGonigal's third book, Imaginable: How to See the Future Coming and Feel Ready for Anything―Even Things That Seem Impossible Today, was released on March 22, 2022.

== Recognition ==
Date	Award	Description
2010	O: The Oprah Magazine "2010 O Power List"	Named in O: The Oprah Magazine as one of 20 important women of 2010 on the "2010 O Power List"
2008	Women in Games: Gamasutra 20	Named in the first Gamasutra 20, honoring 20 notable women working in video games.
2008	South by Southwest Interactive Award for Activism	Awarded for World Without Oil
2006	MIT Technology Review's TR100	Named one of the world's top innovators under the age of 35 by MIT's Technology Review.
2005	2005 Innovation Award from the International Game Developers Association and a 2005 Games-related Webby Award.	For I Love Bees, the Halo 2 promotion.

== Publications ==
External videos
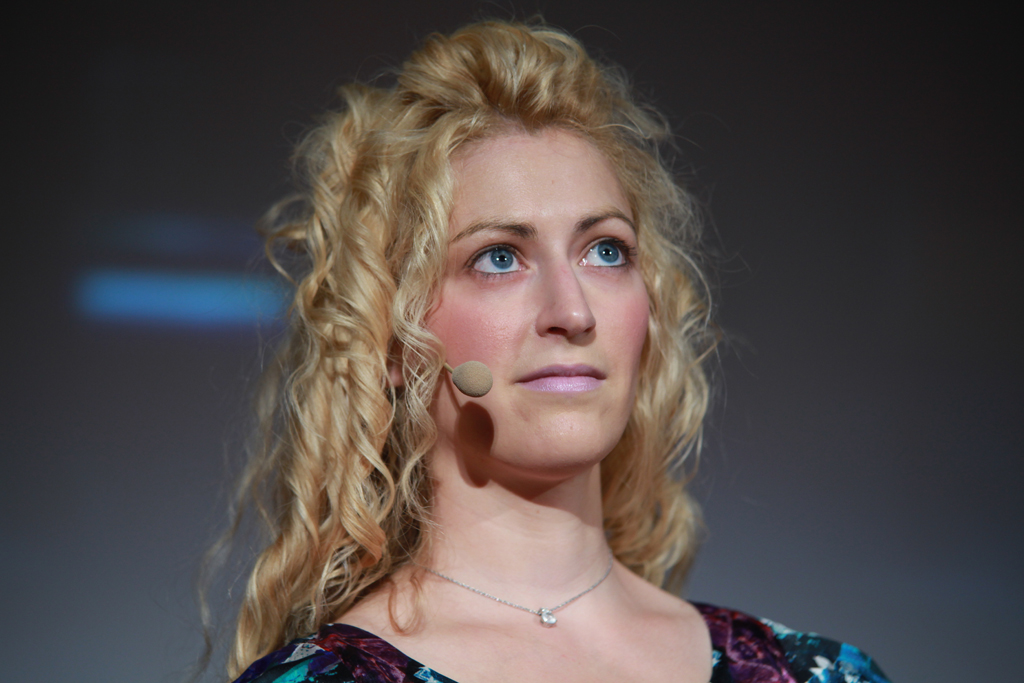
- Jane McGonigal: Massively multi-player... thumb-wrestling?, TED Talks, published November 15, 2013

- McGonigal, Jane (2011). Reality Is Broken: Why Games Make Us Better and How They Can Change the World. Penguin Press. ISBN 978-1-59420-285-8.
- McGonigal, Jane (2015). SuperBetter: A Revolutionary Approach to Getting Stronger, Happier, Braver and More Resilient. Penguin Press. ISBN 978-1-59420-636-8.
- McGonigal, Jane (2022). Imaginable: How to See the Future Coming and Feel Ready for Anything―Even Things That Seem Impossible Today. Spiegel & Grau. ISBN 978-1-954118-09-6.
