= Frog Fractions =

Browser game developed by Twinbeard Studios

- Developer: Twinbeard Studios
- Engine: Unity (GotDE)
- Platforms: Adobe Flash; Microsoft Windows (GotDE)
- Release: Flash: WW: October 25, 2012; Windows: WW: August 5, 2020
- Genre: Edutainment
- Mode: Single-player

Frog Fractions is a 2012 browser game developed by Twinbeard Studios, a company composed primarily of founder Jim Stormdancer. The game, released on October 25, 2012, has been described as a spoof of the edutainment game genre. In the game, the player begins by controlling a frog to eat bugs and defend fruit. Later on, the player may spend points on upgrades to improve their frog's abilities. The game does not actually teach the player about fractions; the player's score is given in fractions, but no knowledge of them is necessary to play.

Its sequel, Frog Fractions 2, announced by a Kickstarter in 2014, was released in December 2016 after players successfully completed a multi-segmented alternative reality game assembled by Stormdancer. The first game was later ported to Windows and released on Steam in August 2020 as Frog Fractions: Game of the Decade Edition, along with downloadable content that adds a new playable story.

== Gameplay ==
The beginning of the second half of the game's first level. The player controls Hop the frog, who rides a flying dragon, and must dodge the projectiles fired by attacking insects.

Frog Fractions begins with a frog named Hop sitting on a lily pad. The player controls Hop, and must use his tongue to attack insects, while collecting and protecting fruit. The game later introduces upgrades that the player may purchase, including lock-on targeting, a cybernetic brain, and a flying dragon named Draggy. When the player collects enough fruit, they can buy a warp drive, which lets Hop ride Draggy through an asteroid field to Bug Mars, where he then battles an alien robot squid. Hop is then sent to Bug Court, where he signs for a work visa. Hop then travels under the water below Bug Mars, while listening to a narrated fictional history of the creation of boxing. At the end of the maze, Hop activates a spaceship, and the player must complete a text adventure game to return to Bug Mars. Upon returning, Hop runs for president in a Dance Dance Revolution-style game. Regardless of how well the player performs, Hop succeeds in being elected president, and a fake credits scene plays. After the fake credits, the player must complete a business simulator manufacturing bug pornography to unlock further upgrades. Once all required upgrades are collected, the game concludes. The game takes about one hour to complete.

=== Hop's Iconic Cap DLC ===
Years after the events of Frog Fractions, Hop has been impeached and works at a theater production of his original adventure, where he is constantly heckled by an internet troll in the audience named Content-Aware Phil (Note: whose name is a pun on "content-aware fill"). Disillusioned with his job and fearing he is becoming estranged from his daughter October, the player plays a point-and-click adventure game to help the two sneak out of the house and go on a new adventure so they can reconnect. While they visit the Frog Fractions Science Museum, Hop receives multiple phone calls from his cat wife Hatricia stating that her archaeological team has uncovered a cursed grave site on a dig and, through a complex series of events, she has become a new demiurge. Draggy, now working for Redcane Group, Inc., calls Hop for a meeting at the request of his boss Dom Schema, but he, Hop and October are attacked by Schema during the meeting and must escape via an Ikaruga-inspired scrolling shooter game.

After hiding in an IKEA, the three decide to infiltrate Redcane to find the truth, now accompanied by the still-heckling Phil. They first attempt to find ores needed to fool the building's odor scanner via a Boulder Dash-inspired digging game. When that attempt fails, they obtain an employee keycard and sneak into the building via a turn-based puzzle game. Entering the deepest level of the building, the group discovers hundreds of Hop clones in holding containers. Schema appears and reveals he is the original Hop and that the one controlled by the player is a clone, created when he got too old for adventuring. Due to Hop settling into a routine and becoming boring, Schema intends to replace Hop with another clone, prompting a final RPG battle with Schema. Phil's heckling during the battle so infuriates the other Hop clones that they escape their captivity, killing Phil and Schema before rampaging through the streets of Bug Francisco as the credits roll. After the credits, October and Hop work together in the digging game to find VHS tapes of skate videos, which contain information Hatricia needs to obtain bureaucratic forms limiting her responsibilities as demiurge. After digging deep enough, they emerge in the underground kingdom of Gehennom, where the family is happily reunited.

== Development ==
Stormdancer, as the one-man game studio Twinbeard Studios, originally created Frog Fractions to entertain his friends, and to see their reactions when they first played it. Later on, he felt that with the indie genre taking off, Frog Fractions was taken more seriously among gamers. Stormdancer noted that although critics often described the game as a satire on old educational games, he never intentionally developed Frog Fractions with that in mind. Instead, Stormdancer explained that Frog Fractions had an educational theme because of the name's alliteration, and because he considered educational games a part of his youth.

Originally, Frog Fractions included tutorials to teach the player how to progress through the game. However, after Stormdancer asked his friend Tim Ambrogi to play test the game, Ambrogi stated that he did not want to read any of the informational popups that appeared throughout the game because he was too busy focusing on the gameplay. Stormdancer added transitions that made the game feel like a "dream-like progression", which he believed would better appeal to players. For transitions in the game's latter half, Stormdancer wanted the transitions to entertain players more, rather than attempt to make any sense of the game's story. PC World complimented Frog Fractions for using the transitions to draw connections between each scene to add a feeling of consistency, despite the often strange transitions that take place.

In order to make money from Frog Fractions, Stormdancer first sold the game's soundtrack, with part of the proceeds going to the game's music team. He later decided to sell T-shirts containing jokes from the game in order to benefit its art team. While developing Frog Fractions, Stormdancer said that he came up with a lot of other video game ideas, but he then realized that he could implement them immediately into Frog Fractions rather than start a new project, due to the game's unpredictable nature.

== Release ==
Stormdancer released Frog Fractions earlier than he wanted, when he sent an incomplete version to the 2013 Independent Games Festival as a "Main Competition Entrant" but was told that he needed to increase the game's popularity before it would be accepted. Subsequently, he let Gamasutra editor and popular Twitter user Brandon Sheffield play the game, who enjoyed it so much that he shared it with his more than 3,000 Twitter followers. Within a day, tens of thousands of people had played the game.

After the game's release, players began requesting new features, such as more updates, a high definition version for tablets and smartphones, and a sequel. Stormdancer was interested in developing a high definition version in which he could include some leftover ideas, but admitted that he was unsure if this would ever materialize. He noted that he created Frog Fractions to gain visibility for himself rather than to profit from it. Frog Fractions was described as being possibly the "greatest game of all time" by Rock Paper Shotgun, who credited the wild range of gameplay mechanics. It was also called "the most deranged thing you'll play this year" by Eurogamer, and "either the best or worst piece of math edu-tainment in history" by the Gameological Society. The game won Giant Bomb's "URL of the Year" award for 2012. In March 2014, Twinbeard launched a Kickstarter campaign to crowdfund the development of a sequel entitled Frog Fractions 2.

=== Game of the Decade Edition ===
In January 2020, it was announced that Frog Fractions would be released via Steam later in the year as Frog Fractions: Game of the Decade Edition. Due to Flash no longer being supported, the game was ported to C# using Haxe before being reimplemented into the Unity engine. The in-game graphics were also upscaled to support 4K resolution displays. Game of the Decade Edition was released on August 2, 2020, as a free download. A piece of paid downloadable content called "Hop's Iconic Cap" was released alongside the game, with Stormdancer saying to try the DLC if "you want to eat bugs while wearing a hat". While billed solely as a cosmetic item for the original game, parodying the "Horse Armor" DLC for the 2006 videogame The Elder Scrolls IV: Oblivion, the "Hop's Iconic Cap" content actually unlocks an additional game story with new gameplay styles; Stormdancer has stated he considers "Hop's Iconic Cap" to be Frog Fractions 4. An update released for the game in October 2020 added new secrets to "Hop's Iconic Cap", along with Steam achievements for Game of the Decade Edition. The update includes over 100 new secrets and changes, described by Stormdancer as "ranging in obscurity from 'can't miss it' to 'break out the decompiler.'"

== Sequel ==
Stormdancer announced his plans for a sequel, Frog Fractions 2, via a Kickstarter campaign in March 2014, with a planned release in 2015. The Kickstarter campaign was successful raising $72,107, which exceeded the goal of $60,000. The campaign included a number of elements that pointed players towards a larger alternate reality game (ARG) that incorporated a number of web sites, social media accounts, real-life locations, and around two dozen independent video games. The ARG was solved by players around December 2016, discovering a physical box that triggered the release of Frog Fractions 2, hidden within the content of the video game Glittermitten Grove.
