= Andrea Phillips =

Game designer

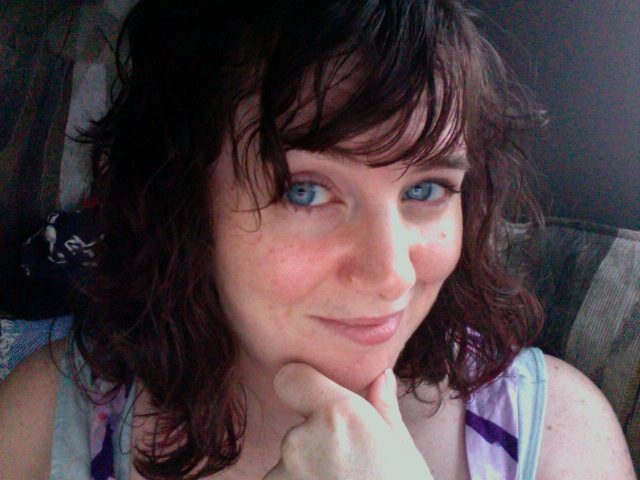
- Born: July 20, 1974 (age 52); Michigan, United States
- Occupations: Game designer, Author
- Website: www.deusexmachinatio.com

Andrea Phillips (born 20 July 1974) is an American transmedia game designer and writer. She has been active in the genres of transmedia storytelling and alternate reality games (ARGs), in a variety of roles, since 2001. She has written for, designed, or substantially participated in the creation of Perplex City, the BAFTA-nominated Routes (a project of Channel 4), and The 2012 Experience, a marketing campaign for the film 2012.

== Entry to alternate reality gaming ==
Phillips came to the genre in 2001, when she co-moderated the Cloudmakers mailing list which served players of "The Beast", the ARG which revolved around the release of the movie A.I. Artificial Intelligence. The Cloudmakers community encompassed thousands of players of the game and eventually included a "guide," walking players step-by-step through the game as it happened, a "journey", describing in prose the content of the game and its backstory, and a "trail", functioning as an FAQ to organize the multiple sites and widespread information sources present within the game. As a player of the game, Phillips co-wrote "the journey" and contributed to versions 4.5 through 9.0 of "the trail".

== Work in transmedia ==
=== Perplex City ===
In 2005, Phillips transitioned from being a player of transmedia and alternate reality games to being a designer of them. She was hired by Mind Candy as an "'ad hoc' polymath", doing "'a little bit of whatever it takes to keep the game rolling,' be it designing and writing puzzles or live event coordination.". Perplex City was the first "freestanding" alternate reality game to run as a stand-alone project rather than as a marketing vehicle for a traditional media project and Phillips stayed with the project until Mind Candy announced in 2007 that Perplex City was being put on indefinite hold.

=== Routes ===
In 2008, Phillips was hired as Lead Game Designer for Routes, a multimedia game targeted at British teenagers and run by Channel 4 and the Wellcome Trust. Routes included interactive Flash games, an alternate reality game, a television documentary featuring Katherine Ryan, and a series of webisode videos. The project ran live for eight weeks between January and March 2009 and won or was shortlisted for a number of industry awards. It won a 2010 International Visual Communications Association (IVCA) Gold award in the Web 2.0 category and the IVCA Grand Prix award the same year. It was also a BAFTA nominee in the Children's Interactive category in 2009 and a BIMA winner for content.

=== Other projects ===
Phillips has also worked as lead writer and game designer for "The 2012 Experience", an alternate reality game used as marketing for 2012, a Roland Emmerich film.

Phillips also worked with Thomas Dolby in the creation of his online game "A Map of the Floating City", listed as "Quarter Master for game design, writing, UI." The game's purpose was to promote the artis'ts upcoming album of the same name. Credits also listed Th, tks to Hollywood producer J. J. Abrams.

On her own initiative, Phillips has developed Madame Zee, a Twitter stream and blog that delivers tongue-in-cheek horoscopes and advice, My Super First Day, a "massively collaborative storytelling project", and The TSA Choice, a crowdsourced activism site opposing recent changes to TSA airport screening procedures.

== Industry participation ==
Phillips was a founding member of the International Game Developers Association's Special Interest Group on Alternate Reality Games and has carried out a variety of duties under that umbrella, including contributing to an Association whitepaper. She currently serves as Chairman of the Special Interest Group. She has also written extensively on the topic of transmedia on her blog, Deus Ex Machinatio.

Phillips has been a presenter at numerous industry gatherings, including Foo Camp 2010, South by Southwest 2010, and an MIT conference on "Storytelling 3.0".

== Publications ==
Phillips in 2012 published A Creator's Guide to Transmedia Storytelling as a guide for current and aspiring modern storytellers. Phillips presents techniques, guidance, and information from her own professional experience as well as from interviews with other professionals in Transmedia.

In February 2013, Phillips created a Kickstarter project to raise funds for a year-long fiction serial called The Daring Adventures of Captain Lucy Smokeheart. The project was successfully funded on March 28, 2013, with 251 backers. Beginning in May 2013, Phillips released a new chapter each month, in the fun and lighthearted adventure, and with each chapter accompanied by a puzzle to be solved as well. By successfully solving the puzzles, a reader would be able to find the secret online location to Lucy's treasure.

In February 2016, Phillips published The Daring Mermaid Expedition, an interactive fiction set in the Lucy Smokeheart world, with Choice of Games.

In July, 2020, she published America Inc.: A novel of democracy and dirty tricks, in which a corporation runs for President of the United States.
