= Frog Fractions 2 =

2016 video game

- Developer: Twinbeard
- Publisher: Adult Swim Games
- Director: Jim Stormdancer
- Designers: Jim Stormdancer; Craig Timpany
- Programmers: Jim Stormdancer; Craig Timpany
- Artists: Rachel Sala; Juan Ramirez
- Writers: Jim Stormdancer; Laura Michet; Justin Bortnick; Jenni Polodna
- Composers: Ryan Ike; Danny Aley; Danny Baranowsky; Francisco Cerda; Chris J. Hampton; Ben Prunty
- Platforms: Windows, macOS, Linux
- Release: Windows: WW: December 13, 2016; macOS, Linux: WW: March 30, 2017
- Genre: Edutainment
- Mode: Single-player

Frog Fractions 2 is a sequel to the free browser-based game Frog Fractions, which was developed by independent game studio Twinbeard, founded by Jim Stormdancer. Stormdancer used an extended alternate reality game (ARG) as part of the game's announcement and subsequent development, tying the release of the game to the success of the players' completing the ARG's puzzles. Frog Fractions 2 was revealed to have been released on December 26, 2016, after players completed the ARG, though its content was hidden within the game Glittermitten Grove, a secondary game developed by Craig Timpany, a friend of Stormdancer, and released without much attention a few weeks prior to the ARG's completion. The credits list the title of the game as Frog Fractions 3.

== Gameplay ==
Frog Fractions 2 is primarily presented through "TXT World", a text-based adventure game similar to ZZT. Players move throughout the world solving puzzles and completing various minigames in order to further progress. Examples of such minigames include a text adventure set within The Divine Comedy, a 3D Obama shaving simulator (a 2D version of the game was used during the ARG), and a text-based simulated multiplayer online battle arena game. The game also allows players to import their saved game from Mass Effect 2, which Stormdancer says is part of a larger puzzle.

== Development ==
Following the 2012 release and surprise success of Frog Fractions, Jim Stormdancer did not have immediate plans for a sequel, and instead worked on the mobile title Gunhouse for the development studio Necrosoft. During that time, ideas about what Frog Fractions 2 might be started to come to mind, and by January 2014, had enough of the game planned out to start development. However, Stormdancer was less concerned about its development and more about keeping the same surprising nature that Frog Fractions had. Around this time he came up with the idea of hiding the identity of what Frog Fractions 2 would be until it was actually released. This led to three months of work to develop a pitch video for Kickstarter as to obtain funding for the game; several friends helped him to film and star in this production. The Kickstarter campaign launched in March 2014, and Stormdancer wrote in its pitch that Frog Fractions 2 would be "a weird ride I would release someday, under a different name", leaving it up to players to actually find the game themselves. The Kickstarter was successfully funded in April 2014, with $72,107 pledged from 2,571 backers, exceeding the planned $60,000 goal.

Full development work started in April 2014. Stormdancer had used a similar approach he took from the first Frog Fractions, in that he built each section as an extension of the previous section. He already had a number of small game prototypes that he planned to incorporate into the final game. One of these was called an ASCII-based "TXT World", which would become the central hub for Frog Fractions 2. "TXT World" was inspired by ZZT, Deadly Rooms of Death, and Insanity, with Stormdancer citing these as obscure games few had heard of but that he loved. He recognized that "TXT World" would serve well as the hub, letting his other mini-games branch off from it, and added flavor elements of The Legend of Zelda atop it. On advice from Tim Ambrogi, who had helped test both Frog Fractions, Stormdancer added dynamic elements to "TXT World" that let the player gain access to more parts of the game, such as a sword to help cut through bushes blocking paths.

Early on in development, Stormdancer knew that he wanted to release Frog Fractions 2 hidden within a city-building style game called Glittermitten Grove which was developed by Stormdancer's friend Craig Timpany and alongside Frog Fractions 2. In contrast to Frog Fractions 2, Glittermitten Grove did not require any narrative, making it easy to focus on its gameplay. As Stormdancer assembled more of the mini-games for Frog Fractions 2, he recognized he was lacking a narrative. His co-developer Justin Bortnick suggested they could use the tutorial character they designed for Glittermitten Grove as the protagonist for Frog Fractions 2. Though they did develop a story arc for this character that was ultimately dropped, they still found that her presence as a persistent narrator within Frog Fractions 2 helped to tie all the mini-games together.

Stormdancer had anticipated the game to be done by August 2015, but had not completed it by that point. Adult Swim Games helped to provide Stormdancer with about 18 additional months of funding to complete the game.

=== Alternate reality game and release ===
The development of Frog Fractions 2 was accompanied by two multiple-year ARGs, gaining much media attention. Stormdancer had often referred to what would be released as Frog Fractions 2, the game, as "Frog Fractions 3", envisioning the ARGs as "Frog Fractions 2" and a game in and of itself. Large coordinated efforts of players worked together to try to decipher the elements of the ARG.

One ARG involved hiding parts of Frog Fractions 2 within several different indie games on Steam, including Crypt of the NecroDancer, The Magic Circle, Quadrilateral Cowboy, Duskers, Firewatch, and Moon Hunters, where different parts of an "eye sigil" graphic was found, directing players to find a portion of a map within the game, which eventually pointed to real life locations. Stormdancer credits 31 different developers for their help in this portion. Stormdancer ran this ARG and used relationships with developers he met at Game Developers Conferences to work on inserting Frog Fractions 2-related material into their games. Stormdancer had found some independent developers had included the sigil without his request in their games, making these games red herrings within the community trying to decipher the puzzle, which he found helped to deepen the mystery akin to an urban legend. He had initially planned to have the sigil ARG lead to a map image that would provide a password that the player could apply within Glittermitten Grove to decrypt the Frog Fractions 2, but felt this forced players to examine the executables of the indie games for art information, and opted for a different approach, eventually deciding to only have Glittermitten Grove update once a milestone in the ARG was met.

The more narrative-driven ARG was initially created by Stormdancer before being handed off to be run by Justin Bortnick, who also served as a writer on the video game. This ARG, initiated by the Kickstarter pitch video, focused on the idea of time travel, and centered on "the story of the 'Resistance' [...], a group that was manipulating timelines to prevent an existential threat called the 'Decay' from destroying their world and our timeline". Bortnick wrote the ARG's narrative alongside the story they were building for Frog Fractions 2, and described that at one point they had considered using the name Fairies vs. Badgers instead of Glittermitten Grove, but dropped that title, requiring him to drop a plot line regarding badgers from the ARG. As the release of the video game neared, Bortnick was producing less content for the ARG, and he and Stormdancer were considering ending it. Near the same time, one of the ARG's players, Erica Newman (a PhD ecologist from the University of California, Berkeley), won a box of clues from an ARG event centered around Indiecade. She received the box in person from Stormdancer, and jokingly offered to write additional ARG content without involving other developers with the goal of keeping players interested and further developing the fictional universe of the ARG. Stormdancer encouraged this, believing this kept the chaotic spirit of Frog Fractions. Newman brought in two others, Justin Melvin, and Micah Edwards, to help with puzzle development. At least six musicians and musical groups were brought in to write original music, and Newman created all art and remaining story elements for the ARG. As Newman's branch of the ARG started gaining attention, it was agreed that she would run out the rest of the ARG. She, Melvin and Edwards then created ARG content that introduced new characters and plot lines, spanned websites like Facebook and YouTube, and incorporated physical puzzles. At the ARG's conclusion, Newman tied her story to Bortnick and Stormdancer's original ARG content as a lead-up to the game's release.

The ARG was solved after 2 years and 8 months in late December 2016. Players of the ARG found clues to a physical location where a box with a button, labeled "FF2", and a key switch was found, as well as to a real-life escape the room game where players found the matching key. The key was shipped to the box recoverer, and was triggered on December 24, 2016; once triggered, Glittermitten Grove was updated with the Frog Fractions 2 content. Newman said that they had set some of the narrative that activating the box would release the "Decay", and had suggested the option of destroying the box to prevent this. Newman said they had no backup plan were the box to be destroyed, because she was confident that the ARG players would release the game no matter what the cost, as was introduced through the narration to them.

The large update to Glittermitten Grove and its content was eventually discovered by players a few days later. Those that backed the Kickstarter could contact Stormdancer for Steam keys if they could tell him the hidden location of game following the activation of the box, though they were encouraged to keep the reveal quiet until more players had found the hidden game. Stormdancer has retrospectively stated he considers the ARG itself to be Frog Fractions 2, with the game being Frog Fractions 3.

== Reception ==
Reception

Review scores
Publication	Score
Destructoid	4/10
Polygon	7.5/10

Frog Fractions 2 itself has received mixed reviews, with reviewers noting that the anticipation of a Frog Fractions sequel has potentially diminished the surprise element that made the predecessor as popular as it was. Writing for Polygon, Janine Hawkins wrote that "Frog Fractions 2 feels more concerned with its own irreverence than with being outright surprising"; Jeffrey Matulef for Eurogamer wrote that the "game is stretched too thin with a more predictable format that robs it of its predecessor's more purposeful pace". Darren Nakamura of Destructoid noted that "without the element of surprise, Frog Fractions 2 is just a collection of mostly bad minigames." Reception for the Alternate Reality Game was more positive, and the ARG appeared on several "Best of 2016" lists on websites such as Vice's Waypoint and Giant Bomb.
