= Kelly McGonigal =

American psychologist

- Born: 21 October 1977 (age 49)
- Education: Boston University (BA); Stanford University (PhD)

Kelly McGonigal (born October 21, 1977) is a health psychologist and lecturer at Stanford University who is known for her work in the field of "science help" which focuses on translating insights from psychology and neuroscience into practical strategies that support health and well-being. Mainstream media articles about inner-conflict-related aspects of modern lifestyles regularly quote her. A longtime advocate of self-compassion and mindfulness as stress-coping strategies, McGonigal has altered her focus on the problematic aspects of stress; in a talk at the TEDGlobal 2013, she emphasized the importance of an individual's subjective belief in themselves as someone who is able to cope successfully as being a crucial factor in their actual response to stress.

== Background and career ==
McGonigal, who is the identical twin of game designer Jane McGonigal, was brought up in New Jersey by public school teacher parents who emphasized intellectual attainment. Although she is now grateful for their protectiveness, McGonigal says it seemed like "lockdown" at the time, describing her upbringing as "both good and stressful".

She received a BA in psychology and a BS in mass communication at Boston University, and her PhD at Stanford University, where she is a lecturer in psychology and teaches a public course on willpower.

=== Advocacy ===
A practitioner of meditation, McGonigal was the chief editor of peer-reviewed journal the International Journal of Yoga Therapy from 2005 to 2012 and advocated yoga and similar mindfulness practices as a way to re-charge and direct attention and mental resources so as to achieve desired outcomes. The rationale was based on studies on the effect of meditation on the brain, and the Ego depletion model, also called the 'strength' theory of self-control, proposed by a team led by Roy Baumeister. McGonigal's simple summary of the 'strength' theory of self-control: "Self-control is like a muscle. When used, it gets tired". As a writer and researcher on self-control, McGonigal has frequently been cited for her views on how willpower can be built up and directed. Having emphasized the role of meditation practices for fighting stress to enable better functioning in challenging circumstances, McGonigal altered her standpoint somewhat in 2013, and now emphasizes the attitude taken to stress as the crucial factor.

== Willpower ==
McGonigal defines willpower as "the ability to do what you really want to do when part of you really doesn't want to do it", and says that humans experience conflicts between impulse and self-control in personal and social contexts, giving examples such as: craving for sweet foods, the urge to be sarcastic or complaining, and the desire to procrastinate. Humans have evolved adaptations to control their instincts and successfully resist impulsive drives, because living in groups requires self-control and this—McGonigal says—means taking the harder option. According to McGonigal, willpower failure or success can spread through a group, because humans tend to mirror the behavior of those they are socially connected with.

The part of the self that enables us to act in a way that is consistent with our long-term goals is based in the prefrontal cortex, and McGonigal advocates body-mind practices that she says prioritize the function of the prefrontal cortex, rather than parts of the brain that are orientated toward instant responses, which is the brain's default setting when under stress. According to McGonigal, the practice of meditation is an effective way to establish the primacy of the prefrontal cortex, thus enabling a choice to do the harder thing, when that is required for attaining a long-term goal. McGonigal believes exercising self-control can help build up willpower in the same way as, over time, physical exercising can increase capacity to exercise. She says: "If you do it with awareness and intention, it can make you stronger. The strength develops over time, even if you feel temporarily weaker. But I think this only works when you have this mindset, and feel like you are consciously choosing to "use" your willpower. If you feel like you are being drained by everything you "have" to do (or not do), that lack of autonomy is even more stressful than exercising self-control." The promise of happiness from cravings often misleads in McGonigal's view, and she gives techniques of mindfully focusing attention on the actual experience when indulging a craving or temptation, so as to compare it with the expectation of reward that preceded it.

One use of willpower that McGonigal sees as counterproductive is thought suppression or trying not think about temptations such as cravings. McGonigal believes thoughts become more intrusive through thought suppression, and it is best to simply register that an unwanted thought has occurred without believing in it or acting on it. Energy to pursue activities is less scarce than to resisting temptation, says McGonigal, suggesting that people give their brains healthy "wants" such as vegetables or a walk after lunch, so that weight loss becomes a by-product of choice.

Learning to be a friend and mentor to ourselves rather than equating self-control with self-criticism is the attitude that she advocates.

== Stress as a friend ==
In a talk given at TEDGlobal 2013 that has more than 30 million online views on the TED website, McGonigal said she had re-evaluated her ideas about stress in the light of new research on how the beliefs held about stress, such as thinking of stress as bad, can affect health. Citing a study suggesting that those who believe stress is bad for them suffer an adverse effect on their life expectancy, she now emphasizes that choosing to view one's stress response as helpful creates the "biology of courage", while connecting with others under stress can create resilience. According to McGonigal, "[t]he old understanding of stress as an unhelpful relic of our animal instincts is being replaced by the understanding that stress actually makes us socially smart – it's what allows us to be fully human." The thesis behind the TED talk and book have subsequently been found by some as possibly flawed.

== Books ==
- Yoga for Pain Relief: Simple Practices to Calm Your Mind and Heal Your Chronic Pain (2009, ISBN 978-1572246898)
- The Willpower Instinct: How Self-Control Works, Why It Matters, and What You Can Do to Get More of It (2012, ISBN 978-1583335086)
- The Neuroscience of Change: A Compassion-Based Program for Personal Transformation (2012, ISBN 978-1604077902)
- The Upside of Stress: Why Stress Is Good for You, and How to Get Good at It (2015, ISBN 978-1583335611)
- The Joy of Movement: How Exercise Helps Us Find Happiness, Hope, Connection, and Courage (2019, ISBN 9780525534105)
