= Ken Eklund =

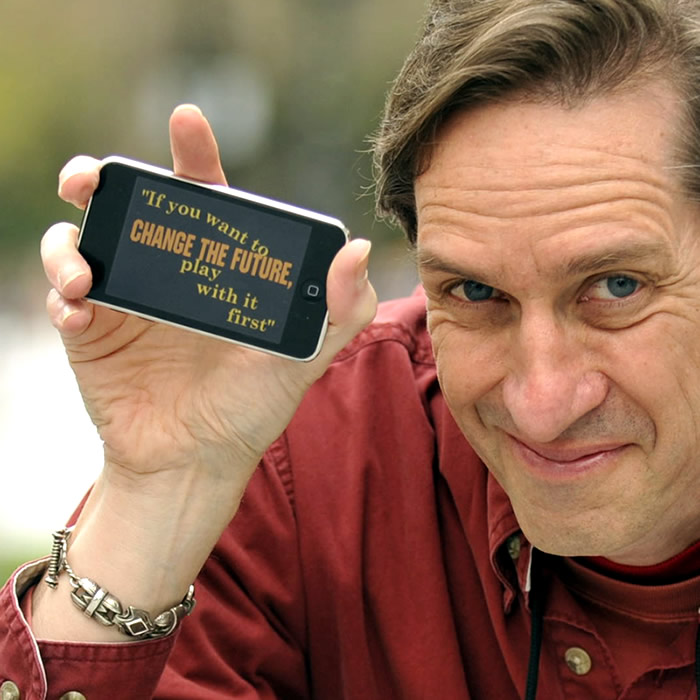
- Ken Eklund in 2009
- Born: May 17, 1957 (age 69); San Francisco, California, United States
- Education: Santa Clara University
- Occupations: Game designer, game experience designer
- Writing career
- Pen name: Writerguy
- Website: www.writerguy.com

Ken Eklund (born May 17, 1957) is an American game and experience designer known as Writerguy. He is perhaps most famous for World Without Oil, an early "serious game" in the alternate reality game genre he created and ran in 2007. His recent projects "explore the positive social effects of collaborative experiences and open-ended, creative play. "

== Philosophy ==
Eklund creates immersive games that intend to have a socially relevant, transformative effect and to be informal learning experiences and crowdsourcing for good. Much of his recent transmedia work explores how contributing to 'authentic fictions' (real-seeming yet fictional stories) engages people directly in real-world issues by allowing them to have fun collaborating on storymaking, positive solutions and action. By creating "barely fictional" gameful situations he creates a new kind of space for negotiating reality, where the candor afforded by interacting with fictional characters presenting the reality of social issues is seemingly more impactful than the realities themselves.

As an artist, Eklund's emphasis on response plus respect for diversity "charges notions of the 'vox pop' with an appealing edge as a tool for transformation 'from the inside'. He speaks on how to use alternate reality experiences and other playful "what if?" spaces in pursuit of serious goals and the potential for gamelike activities to help solve global problems.

== Works ==
- FutureCoast (2014-2016, director)
- Rogue Squirrelbot (2015, director/producer)
- Ruination: City of Dust (2014, designer)
- Hiss Pop (2012, co-creator)
- Ed Zed Omega (2012, director/lead producer)
- Giskin Anomaly (2010, creator/writer)
- Urgent Evoke (2010, community lead)
- Zorop (2010, co-creator)
- Ruby's Bequest (2009, creator)
- World Without Oil (2007, creator)
- Driver: Vegas (mobile) (2006, writer)
- Marc Eckō's Getting Up: Contents Under Pressure (mobile) (2006, writer)
- In Her Shoes (mobile) (2006, writer)
- Move It! (2005, designer/writer)
- Mr. & Mrs. Smith (mobile) (2005, writer)
- Strange Dead Bird (2004, creator)
- Tigo (2003, writer)
- Two Forks, Idaho (2002, creator)
- Mystery of the Poison Dart Frog (2002, creator)
- Pool of Radiance: Ruins of Myth Drannor (2001, writer/designer)
- Star Trek: Deep Space Nine - Harbinger (1995, writer/designer)
- World of Aden: Entomorph - Plague of the Darkfall (1995, writer)
- Al-Qadim: The Genie's Curse (1994, writer)
- Dark Sun: Wake of the Ravager (1994, writer)
- Eagle Eye Mysteries in London (1994, writer/game, character designer)
- Eagle Eye Mysteries (1993, writer/game, character designer)
- Buck Rogers: Matrix Cubed (1992 writer)
- The Dark Queen of Krynn (1992, writer)
- Death Knights of Krynn (1991, writer)
- Buck Rogers: Countdown to Doomsday (1990, writer)

== Awards and honors ==
Date	Award
2022	Peabody Award for World Without Oil project
2014	The Webby Awards finalist Category: Net Art for FutureCoast
2011	22nd Annual MUSE Awards Category: Games and Augmented Reality Award: Silver for Giskin Anomaly
2008	South by Southwest Interactive - Award for Activism for World Without Oil
2008	The Webby Awards, finalist, Games category, for World Without Oil
2008	Zero1.org, Honorable Mention, for World Without Oil
2008	Stockholm Challenge, Honorable Mention, for World Without Oil
