= Journey to the End of the Night (disambiguation) =

Journey to the End of the Night (French: Voyage au bout de la nuit) is the first novel of Louis-Ferdinand Céline.

Journey to the End of the Night may also refer to

- Journey to the End of the Night (Mekons album), a 2000 album by The Mekons
- Journey to the End of the Night (Green Carnation album), a 2000 album by Green Carnation
- Journey to the End of the Night (film), a 2006 film directed by Eric Eason
- Journey to the End of the Night (game), a street game
