= Journey to the End of the Night (game) =

Urban street game

Journey to the End of the Night is an urban street game. Competitors race by foot around an urban area with a visible colored ribbon. Along the way, groups of chasers attempt to tag them, and if they are successful, they remove the competitor's ribbon. Competitors can also seek refuge in designated safe zones. The first competitor to get to all designated checkpoints in order wins. In 2006, the group AntiBoredom started the game in San Francisco as an activity paired with the online/offline game SFZero, and ran it two additional times that year in New York, as part of the Psy-Geo-Conflux and the inaugural Come Out & Play festival. Variants in other cities include Survive DC. According to one organizer, urban tag "allows racers to experience the city a little differently and expand your concept of public space."
