= SFZero =

Alternate reality game based in San Francisco

SF0 logo

SFZero, or SF0, is a web-based community game invented in San Francisco. It is a type of alternate reality game. SFZero players earn points by completing a wide variety of different tasks, often with a focus on creativity, exploration, community, or performance. Although the game was originally intended for San Francisco residents, its player base has expanded to include many other locales both in and outside of America.

SFZero is the creation of Ian Kizu-Blair, Sam Lavigne and Sean Mahan of Playtime Antiboredom, a "nonprofit organization dedicated to producing free immersive art games that use new technologies in significant ways."

== Gameplay ==
=== Groups ===
In the early game, players were required to align with a group upon starting the game. This requirement was later lifted. Currently, players can complete tasks from any group, and can choose to be listed as a member of any group from which they have completed tasks.

Each group has its own goals, interests, and an archive of group tasks. Although SFZero encourages collaboration amongst all players, and many tasks require it as such, it also allows for competition amongst individuals, locales, teams, and groups. It is possible to declare other players both as 'friend' and as 'foe'.

=== Tasks ===
Tasks are created by the players, then performed by other players or groups of players, such as tipping in a non-tipping industry or creating a local urban legend. Players are assigned points based on votes from the community. SF0 features over 130 active tasks, with more than 1200 having been retired, and some 2500 suggested.

=== Events ===
The game also features Events in which players from all SF0 groups are invited to participate in a mass task. For example, the description for the event "The Sweet Cheat Gone" reads:

An investigation of guilt and innocence played out across the streets (zones of desire and exchange) of San Francisco. You are a prosecutor, a private eye, a witness, collecting evidence, not knowing who you can trust, betraying your friends (enemies) to build your case. Pursue a thread of desire that takes you to imaginary crime scenes beneath the skyline.

== See also ==
- Cacophony Society
- Psychogeography
- Dérive

== Additional Coverage ==
- Berton, Justin (2007-11-10). "Flash mob 2.0: Urban playground movement invites participation". SFGATE.
- Blitstein, Ryan (2006-05-31). "More Than Zero". SFWeekly.
- Simon, Nina (2010). Chapter 8: Co-Creating with Visitors. Museum 2.0. ISBN 978-0615346502.
- Terdiman, Daniel (2006-04-14). "Collaborative gaming takes to the streets". CNET News.com. Archived from the original on 2006-07-10.
