= The Art of the Heist =

Advertising campaign and alternate reality game

The Art of the Heist (aka Stolen A3 or Art of the H3ist) was an advertising campaign and an alternate reality game created to promote the Audi A3.

== The promotion ==
In order to promote the new A3 model in 2005, Audi, instead of featuring the car at a show as scheduled, in the car's place they put an announcement that it had been stolen and a request that the public report clues to their website. The car had not been stolen, but they wanted the public to participate in an elaborate nationwide game where clues were planted in public places to hint at where the "thieves" had taken the car. On their website, they posted evidence and the public was encouraged to view the website as actors followed the car over a period of time. The entire program was praised as an innovative advertising campaign.

As a game, it falls under the classification of Alternate Reality Game, or ARG. The game involved, loosely, three layers of interaction: character development and back story, file and password cracking, and live events (or, generally, the Retrievals). Players who were involved in the live events received special pins and complimentary cell phones (which, as a side note, were difficult for some winners to activate).

== The story ==
The story revolved around Nisha Roberts and Ian Yarbrough, and their art retrieval business, Last Resort Retrieval. The majority of the plot involved the attempts of Nisha, Ian, the players, and Nisha's video game designer friend, Virgil in trying to stop the world's greatest art heist. Ian and Nisha, specifically, were hot on the tracks of a very coordinated theft team, which was led by a person who was initially identified only as Arclight. Arclight was organizing theft timetables, commissioning forged replicas, doing reconnaissance work, and hiring all manner of unruly assistants for the big heist. Virgil seemed to be the main suspect throughout much of the game, due to his odd behaviour and lousy attitude.

Early in the game, a security camera recording was discovered which showed a shadowy villain stashing pieces of information inside 6 different Audi A3 cars. The cars, throughout the course of the game, were all tracked down, and infiltrated by the Retrievers, to get back the information hidden in them. By piecing together the whole of all data found in all cars, the full scope of the Big Art Heist was revealed.

== Major characters ==
=== Nisha ===
Nisha Roberts is an art recovery expert working under the company name of Last Resort Retrieval, together with her boyfriend Ian.

=== Ian ===
Ian is a computer hacker, and boyfriend of the often tempestuous Nisha. Their relationship is explored to the degree of him being jealous of her being the one in the spotlight. At one point in the game, he decides to boldly take on a job which Nisha would otherwise tackle, and is roundly criticised for his poor planning.

=== Virgil ===
Virgil is a legendary game designer. He and Nisha are old friends. He was married, but his wife died some years ago, sending Virgil's life into turmoil. He has become a recluse, and had only recently (as of the time of this ARG) come out into the public eye once again, building a game based directly on Nisha Roberts, called The Nisha Chronicles: Volume 1. During the game, Virgil was often foreshadowed as being the villain, but in reality he was simply paranoid due to his line of work, and traumatized by the loss of his wife.

=== Arclight ===
Arclight was the criminal mastermind behind the art theft.

=== The Retrievers ===
Essential to the play of the game were a number of real-life players, who would be broadly dubbed "retrievers." Retrievers would be called in, on various occasions, to different places around the United States, where they would attempt to retrieve an SD card from inside an Audi A3.
