= World Without Oil =

Alternate reality game

The alternate reality game's logo

World Without Oil (WWO) is an alternate reality game (ARG) created to call attention to, spark dialogue about, plan for and engineer solutions to a possible near-future global oil shortage, post peak oil. It was the creation of San Jose game writer and designer Ken Eklund, and ARG veterans Jane McGonigal, Dee Cook, Marie Lamb, Michelle Senderhauf, and Krystyn Wells were on the puppetmaster team. World Without Oil was presented by Independent Television Service (ITVS) with funding by the Corporation for Public Broadcasting.

The game's tagline is "Play it – before you live it."

The game concluded on June 1, 2007.

== The game ==
World Without Oil combined elements of an alternate reality game with those of a serious game. The game sketched out the overarching conditions of a realistic oil shock, then called upon players to imagine and document their lives under those conditions. Compelling player stories and ideas were incorporated into the official narrative, posted daily. Players could choose to post their stories as videos, images or blog entries, or to phone or email them to the WWO gamemasters. The game's central site linked to all the player material, and the game's characters documented their own lives, and commented on player stories, on a community blog and individual blogs, plus via IM, chat, Twitter and other media.

The game was announced on March 2, 2007, and its teaser site went live at that time. A countdown site appeared approximately 2 weeks before the gamestart on April 30, 2007. The game concluded 32 days later, on June 1, 2007.

== Goals ==
The World Without Oil game asked players to imagine a world reeling from a sudden oil shortage, describe how the crisis is unfolding where they live, and work together on simple and practical ways to adapt. By playing it out in a serious way, the game aimed to apply collective intelligence and imagination to the problem in advance, and create a record that has value for educators, policymakers, and the common people to help anticipate the future and prevent its worst outcomes. In sum, World Without Oil invited people to, per its slogan, “Play it - before you live it.”

== Acclaim ==
World Without Oil was an Awards Nominee in the Games category for a 2008 Webby Awards, earned an Honorable Mention for the Prix Green award for Environmental Art at the 01SJ 2008 festival, and was honored with a Special Mention in the Environment category for its contribution to humanity in the 2008 Stockholm Challenge. The game won the award for Activism at the South by Southwest Interactive conference in March 2008.

In 2022, World Without Oil was awarded a Peabody Award in a new category for Digital and Interactive Storytelling.

== Criticism ==
An in depth analysis of player contributions in the game challenges the above claims by revealing the dominance of a handful of players including the puppet masters and commonplace sustainability themes such as alternate commute options or local foods.
