= Matt Wolf (video game designer) =

American designer, director, producer, and game inventor

- Matt Wolf at Emmy post party in September 2007.
- Born: Tennessee
- Occupation(s): Video game designer, new media designer, director, producer, creator, board game inventor

Matt Wolf is an American video game and new media designer, director, producer, creator and board game inventor. Wolf also conceived the first alternate reality game to ever win a Primetime Emmy Award.

== Biography ==
Born in Tennessee and raised in Santa Barbara and Sacramento, Matt Wolf is the only son of two psychologists with PhDs. Wolf started his career at Electronic Arts in 1992 and worked there until 1998. Wolf moved from Electronic Arts to Sega Entertainment in 1998, and in 2000, he left Sega Entertainment to form Double Twenty Productions (D20). Today, Wolf still runs D20 as his primary media and entertainment production company.

In 2007, one of Wolf's original creations, The Fallen: The Oculuar Effect Alternate Reality Game won the Primetime Emmy Award for Outstanding Achievement in Enhanced or Interactive Television — Television at the 59th Primetime Emmy Awards. Wolf originally conceived the game's story and design for ABC Family to promote their Falcon mini-series. It also won Best Experimental Project at SXSW in 2007 and Best Interactive Program at the Banff World Television Festival in 2007.

Wolf is currently VP Entertainment, Ventures and Strategic Alliances at The Coca-Cola Company. Prior to that, he was Global Head of Gaming for The Coca-Cola Company. He also acts as interactive creative adviser to the Robert Ludlum estate. The estate relies on Wolf to oversee Ludlum-based interactive projects including The Bourne Conspiracy and the greater Jason Bourne franchise. Wolf will not comment on future Ludlum games as noted by The Hollywood Reporter in August 2007, "Matt Wolf says the Ludlum estate won't talk about its plans for the franchise." Wolf has had similar roles with Gracie Films (The Simpsons: Hit & Run) and the Roald Dahl estate (Charlie and the Chocolate Factory).

== Awards and recognition ==
- 2007: Primetime Emmy Award Winner, Outstanding Achievement in Enhanced or Interactive Television — Television (The Fallen: The Oculuar Effect Alternate Reality Game)
- 2007: Best Experimental Project, South by Southwest (SXSW). (The Fallen: The Oculuar Effect Alternate Reality Game)
- 2007: Best Interactive Program, Banff World Television Awards. (The Fallen: The Oculuar Effect Alternate Reality Game)
- 2006: FamilyFun Magazine's 2006 Toy of the Year, Winner, (BubbleBrain)
- 1993: Electronic Arts Rookie of the Year
