= Laura E. Hall =

Writer and puzzle game designer

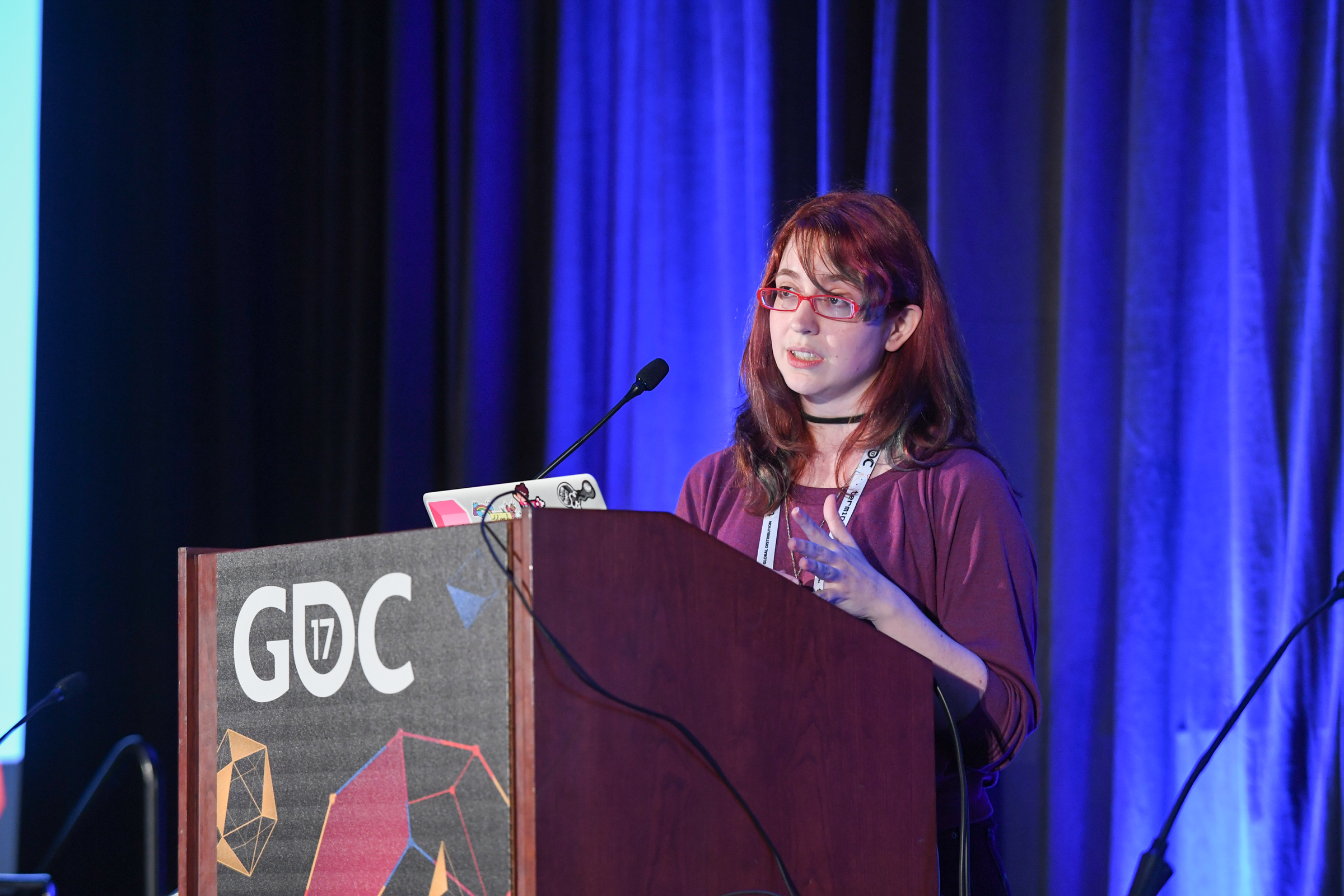
- Hall speaking at the 2017 Game Developers Conference
- Other name: L. E. Hall
- Occupations: Game designer, puzzle designer, author
- Website: lauraehall.com

Laura E. Hall is an American immersive artist, puzzle game designer, and writer. She has written several books about video games, immersive entertainment, and escape rooms.

Hall co-created one of the first escape rooms in the United States. In 2022, Hall was the subject of a documentary about solving an alternate reality game puzzle 14 years after it was set, called Finding Satoshi (""謎の日本人サトシ"").

== Puzzles ==
Hall began participating in alternate reality games in college, and played Perplex City. She became invested in puzzles after moving to Portland and attending Puzzled Pint events.

After Perplex City's completion in 2007, Hall continued to work on a puzzle that was still unsolved, Billion to One. The puzzle focused on exploring the concept of Six degrees of separation by presenting a man's photograph and his first name, "Satoshi", asking players to locate him. In 2020, Tom-Lucas Säger used image recognition software and located Satoshi, reporting it to Hall, who ran the website tracking information about the hunt.

In 2022, Hall was the subject of a documentary about the Billion to One puzzle, Finding Satoshi.

== Installation Art and Game Design ==
In 2014, Hall and five friends opened the first escape room game in the state of Oregon and one of the first 22 escape rooms in the United States.

She has since created escape rooms and immersive experiences around the United States and the world.

Her installation art and games have appeared in the Portland Art Museum, XOXO, and the London Games Festival.

== Writing ==
Hall writes about films, games, and culture for Letterboxd, Dan and Dave’s Art of Play, A Profound Waste of Time, and The Atlantic.

=== Katamari Damacy (2018) ===
In 2018, Hall published Katamari Damacy with Boss Fight Books about the creation of the 2004 video game Katamari Damacy, featuring interviews with creator Keita Takahashi.

=== Planning Your Escape (2021) ===
In 2021, Hall published Planning Your Escape: Strategy Secrets to Make You an Escape Room Superstar with Simon & Schuster, about the history of the immersive entertainment genre and a toolkit for new escape room players.
