= World Bank Institute =

The World Bank Institute is the capacity building branch of the World Bank. It provides learning programs, policy advice and technical assistance to policy makers, government and non-government agencies, and development practitioners of developing countries. Capacity for Development is defined by the WBI as "the ability of individuals, institutions, and whole societies to solve problems, make informed choices, order their priorities and plan their futures, as well as implement programs and projects, and sustain them over time"

== History ==
The WBI was founded in 1955 as the Economic Development Institute; it was renamed World Bank Institute in 2000.
