= Perplex City =

Alternate reality game created by Mind Candy

- Developer: Mind Candy
- Release: 2005
- Genre: Alternate reality game

Perplex City (wordplay on the term "perplexity") was an alternate reality game (ARG) created by Mind Candy, a London-based developer in 2005. Adrian Hon was the producer, designer and director of the game's first and only completed season, in which players searched for "The Receda Cube" (also known as "The Cube"), an artifact of spiritual significance to the inhabitants of a fictional metropolis known as "Perplex City" which had great scientific value. In the game, "The Cube" had been stolen and buried somewhere on Earth.

The game offered a cash prize of £100,000 (then approximately US$200,000) to the person who found The Cube. Andy Darley discovered it in a wooded area located in Northamptonshire, UK, on February 2, 2007.

Clues were hidden in foil puzzle cards sold by Mind Candy. Each card presented a diverse puzzle, and even though they supplied extra story background, it was feasible to join the ARG without obtaining them. Mind Candy announced that the first set of cards for the new game season, called Perplex City Stories, would be released on 1 March 2007. In June 2007, Mind Candy announced that the release of the second season would indefinitely be put on hold.

== Gameplay ==
Perplex City is an alternative reality game whose story unfolds through a series of collectible puzzle cards. Eventually, 256 cards total were released in four waves. The main objective of the game is to search for a cube named "The Receda Cube", a cube that is physically buried somewhere on Earth, whose location is hinted at through the collectible cards. Every collectible card had a scratch panel that hid a unique code that players can use to track their progress in solving the game. Additionally, each card has an individual puzzle that can be solved outside the main objective of the game.

Clues in the card may lead players to websites, blogs, emails, telephone numbers in the real world, and characters in the game "communicated" with players using blogs, such as in the case of Violet and Scarlett Kiteway, daughters of the Master of the Academy, the organization responsible for maintaining the cube. Players are also encouraged to contribute to the in-universe, online newspaper, The Sentinel, where players can communicate with each other and characters in the game to solve the puzzles.

=== Puzzle cards ===
Mind Candy marketed a range of puzzle cards as collectibles, which they sold in foil packs. Each foil pack contained six random cards which were selected from a pool of 256 cards. The cards were categorized into sets and further into subsets based on their rarity and difficulty levels. Unlike collectible card games such as Magic: The Gathering or Pokémon, the cards are not designed for competitive player-versus-player "combat." Instead, each card depicts a different puzzle, with the rarer cards also featuring more complex riddles. Cards were marked with unique identifiers, which could then be entered onto the Perplex City website, earning points and a place on a leaderboard. Many cards contained hidden features, such as ultraviolet or heat-sensitive inks, and they covered a broad range of themes, from pop-culture trivia to cryptography and logic brainteasers.

Each card was a member of a four-card set. If all four cards were solved by a player, they received double points for each card in the set.

==== Notable cards ====
- Riemann (S1, Card #238) asks players to prove the Riemann hypothesis. As the solution to Riemann hypothesis is currently unknown, this card is currently unsolved and is the only remaining unsolved card. The Scientific Advisory Board of the Clay Mathematics Institute offers a USD 1 million prize for solving this problem along with others in the Millennium Prize Problems.
- The Thirteenth Labour (S1, Card #251) asks players to solve a 352 character cipher encrypted with a RC5.64 cipher that was expected to take 30,000 computers working simultaneously for several months to solve at the time of its release. The cipher was cracked by a user Paraboloid13 in February 2010. While the solution was verified as correct, the user declined to share both the answer and the method they used to solve the puzzle.
- Billion to One (S1, Card #256) features the face of a man with a caption in Japanese that reads 私を見つけなさい, which translates to "Find Me." A hint line for the game gave the further clue, "My name is Satoshi." His image was spread via social networking sites in an attempt to locate and make contact with this person as an experiment in exploring the concept of six degrees of separation. The card was solved in December 2020 when the man in question was found by Tom-Lucas Säger and reported to Laura E. Hall, who ran the website tracking information about the hunt. In an email, Satoshi explained that the original concept had been for him to ask a question of whoever found him. Since he had forgotten the question, the puzzle author Jey Biddulph posted a recording of the spoken question on SoundCloud. It was "Who died after giving birth to flames?" with the answer "Izanami."

==== Out of print cards ====
Two cards are no longer in circulation. The cards were excluded from wave-three print runs because they did not fit on the print layout. While these problems have been rectified, Mind Candy has no plans to replace or reprint these cards in the future. They are:

- Riemann (S1, Card #238) was chosen to be excluded due to the complete inability of the card to be solved for the foreseeable future.
- Relativity (S1, Card #245) was chosen to be excluded more or less at random, but the decision was likely influenced by the fact that the problem and solution are quite complex.

== Plot ==
Perplex City is a fictional extensive imaginary hub, with an unspecified number of ties to Earth and futuristic attributes that include state-of-the-art mobile technology, neuroenhancing drugs, and kilometer-high skyscrapers. City life in Perplex City possesses a slightly more utopian feature than what is usually found on Earth. Puzzles and intellectual endeavors are distinctive characteristics of Perplex City's culture, which are deeply ingrained. The Academy Games, their foremost competitive occasion, is principally a contest of intellectual capabilities rather than physical strength. Almost, almost every aspect of their culture encompasses both the cryptic and mental dimensions.

According to the game, Perplex City's religion is centered around a mythology of buildings, constructions, and technology, none of which is explicitly theistic. In the plot of the game, The Receda Cube artifact (pronounced /ɹɛkˈeɪdə/), which the players are made to find, is a revered and consecrated object. It possesses several extraordinary qualities that many people in this fictional world believe to be of supernatural origin.

At the beginning of the game, the cube is stolen from the Perplex City Academy Museum by Violet Kiteway, the daughter of Perplex City Academy Master Sente Kiteway, and taken to Earth. Until the cube is found, she posts cryptic messages hinting at its location under the name "Combed Thunderclap". The Cube Retrieval Team (CRT) is formed to find the artifact. Due to the unavailability of travel to Earth for the Perplex City citizens, Sente Kiteway requests Earth citizens' aid to locate the artifact and offers to share leads or hints he or the CRT may gather.

It has been discovered that another organization known as the Third Power, and a cult that worships a cube, named the Reconstructionists, are also in search of the cube. Whilst the residents of Earth are searching for the Cube on Earth, a group of individuals in Perplex City, specifically Kurt McAllister, as well as Scarlett and Violet, Sente's two daughters, are attempting to uncover more clues within the city and reveal the identity of Combed Thunderclap. The latter three eventually find the laboratory where the cube was created. It is discovered that Sente constructed the Cube, which can be used as both a weapon and a teleporter. The Cube is finally discovered in Northamptonshire, England; by the people of Earth. They also establish that Violet stole the Cube and concealed it on Earth to prevent the Third Power from acquiring it.

== ARG features ==
The puzzle cards are intended as an introduction to the characters and story of Perplex City itself and the deeper mysteries of the cube theft. Clues found on the cards direct players to various websites, blogs, emails, phone calls, and SMS messages originating from Perplex City. These often feature puzzles of their own, whose solutions lead to further puzzles. Frequently, these puzzles require players to cooperate in reaching various goals.

Perplex City ran from late 2004 to early 2007, much longer than the traditional ARG, which typically runs for around 2 months. Some examples of items that were achieved due to its longevity include:

- Players wrote a book to enable a character to become a "published author" and gain access to relevant archives.
- A full-length CD of cryptic techno music was released by a Perplexian musician.
- A banner plane flew across Manchester with a keyword that enabled access to a new area of the game.
- Sixty players attended an in-game event in search of clues on Clapham Common, only for one of their own to be revealed as a mole and escape in a black helicopter.
- 220 people participated in the first Perplex City Academy Games in London, a high-tech scavenger hunt across the capital. A month later, a similar event was held in New York.

== Board game ==
In late 2006, Mind Candy released Perplex City: The Board Game. Players solve anagrams, logic problems, visual puzzles, and trivia questions to collect a set of colored stones. Players can also challenge one another for their collected stones. To win, the last stone must be collected by challenging another player.

The rules insert maintains an in-universe approach to Perplex City, giving background about its puzzle-loving citizens and a fictional history of the board game.

== Mind Candy ==
The Mind Candy cards were first released in select outlets around the world but are increasingly readily available from retailers both online and offline. On September 7, 2006, Mind Candy announced that GameStop was to begin carrying Perplex City cards in 700 stores in the United States.As of September 26, 2006, some 682,425 cards have been marked as solved on the Perplex City leaderboard, with 45,215 players registered.

Mind Candy received a round of venture capital worth $3 million from Index Ventures, an investor in Skype and other technology companies.

In June 2007, Mind Candy announced that it would be putting Season 2 of its ARG on hold indefinitely. Mind Candy's focus later moved to the Moshi Monsters franchise, and the Perplex City project was abandoned.

== Reception ==
A reviewer from the online second volume of the gaming magazine Pyramid stated that "the object of the game is, well, that depends. The whole game is incremental. At its simplest, the idea is to solve the puzzle on a card. If you want to become 200,000 very real dollars richer (apparently they can do bank transfers across the dimensional gulf), you need to suck as much information as you can out of as many sources as you can, including the cards, some scattered websites, and even real people (or their cell phones), to unlock where on Earth the Cube has been hidden."

== Reviews ==
- Pyramid - Season 2

== See also ==
- Alternate reality game
- Masquerade (book)
- Eric Harshbarger, Perplex City puzzle designer
- Andrea Phillips, Perplex City writer & designer
- Naomi Alderman, Perplex City writer
