= Alternate reality game =

Alternate storytelling in media

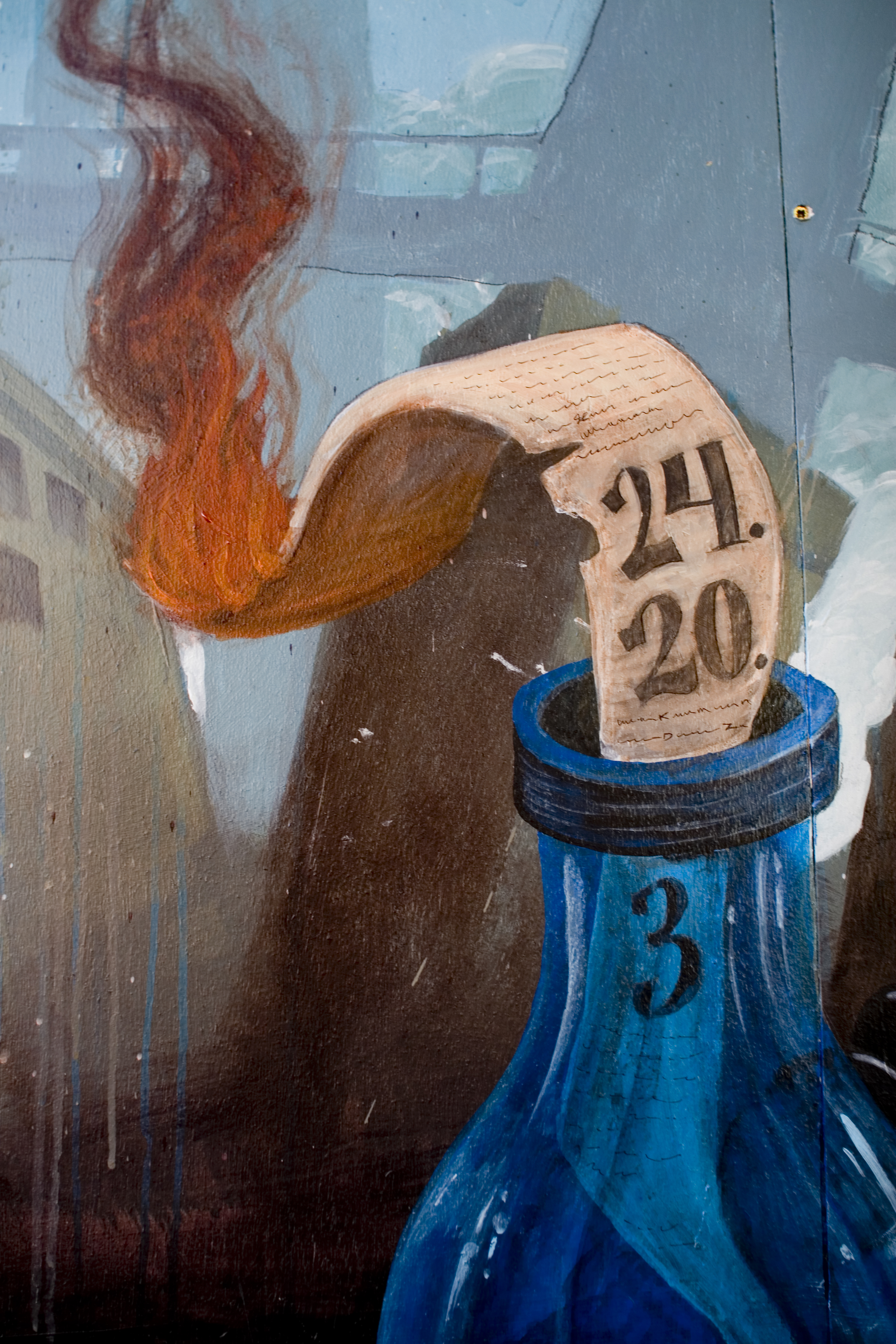
A number hidden in graffiti as part of the Year Zero ARG

An alternate reality game (ARG) is an interactive networked narrative that uses the real world as a platform and employs transmedia storytelling to deliver a story that may be altered by players' ideas or actions.

The form is defined by intense player involvement with a story that takes place in real time and evolves according to players' responses. It is shaped by characters that are actively controlled by the game's designers, as opposed to being controlled by an AI as in a computer or console video game. Players interact directly with characters in the game, solve plot-based challenges and puzzles, and collaborate as a community to analyze the story and coordinate real-life and online activities. ARGs generally utilize multimedia, ranging from websites, social media, videos and sound files to offline media such as telephones and mail. They usually rely on the Internet as the central binding medium.

ARGs tend to be free to play, with costs absorbed either through supporting products (e.g., collectible puzzle cards fund Perplex City) or through promotional relationships with existing products (for example, I Love Bees was a promotion for Halo 2, and the Lost Experience and Find 815 promoted the television show Lost). Pay-to-play models exist as well. Later games in the genre have shown an increasing amount of experimentation with new models and sub-genres.

== Definition ==
There is a great deal of debate surrounding the characteristics by which the term "alternate reality game" should be defined. Sean Stacey, the founder of the website Unfiction, has suggested that the best way to define the genre was not to define it, and instead locate each game on three axes (ruleset, authorship and coherence) in a sphere of "chaotic fiction" that would include works such as the Uncyclopedia and street games like SF0 as well.

Several experts, though, point to the use of transmedia, "the aggregate effect of multiple texts/media artifacts," as the defining attribute of ARGs. This prompts the unique collaboration emanating from ARGs as well; Sean Stewart, founder of 42 Entertainment, which has produced various successful ARGs, speaks to how this occurs, noting that "the key thing about an ARG is the way it jumps off of all those platforms. It's a game that's social and comes at you across all the different ways that you connect to the world around you."

Most ARGs do not have any fixed rules—players discover the rules and the boundaries of the game through trial and error—and do not require players to assume fictional identities or roleplay beyond feigning belief in the reality of the characters they interact with (even if games where players play 'themselves' are a long-standing variant on the genre).

== Scholarly views ==
Overall, academics have been intrigued by ARGs' potential for effective organizing. Across the board, a diverse range of organizations, such as businesses, nonprofits, government agencies, and schools "can learn from the best practices and lessons of ARGs to similarly take advantage of new media and collective problem–solving". As such, implementation of ARGs in these different settings involves finding best practices for honing the collaborative, transmedia elements of ARGs for these respective institutions.

Much of this scholarly interest stems from the evolving media ecology with the rise of new media. In sustaining cooperative online communities, ARGs build on "an alignment of interest, where problems are presented in a fashion that assists game designers in their goal while intriguing and aiding players in their goals". This returns to ARGs' framework of transmedia storytelling, which necessitates that ARG designers relinquish a significant degree of their power to the ARG's audience, problematizing traditional views of authorship.

The majority of the scholarly review on ARGs analyzes their pedagogical advantages. Notably, in the classroom, ARGs can be effective tools for providing exigence on given topics and yield a collaborative and experiential learning environment. By the same token, weaknesses of classroom learning through ARGs include the need for a flexible narrative conducive to collaborative learning in large groups and a sophisticated web design.

In a contribution to a volume focusing on play and cities in Springer's Gaming Media and Social Effects series, Eddie Duggan (2017) provides an overview of pervasive games, and discusses characteristics in ARGs, LARPs, RPGs, assassination games and other games where the notion of the "magic circle" as elaborated by Salen and Zimmerman is confounded.

== Development and history ==
=== Early examples ===
Ong's Hat / Incunabula was most likely started sometime around 1993, and also included most of the aforementioned design principles. Ong's Hat also incorporated elements of legend tripping into its design, as chronicled in a scholarly work titled "Legend-Tripping Online: Supernatural Folklore and the Search for Ong's Hat". Some scholars disagree on the classification of the Ong's Hat story.

In 1997, a year prior to the release of Douglas Adams' computer game Starship Titanic, The Digital Village launched a website purporting to be that of an intergalactic travel agency called Starlight Travel, which in the game is the Starship Titanic's parent company. The site combined copious amounts of Monty Python-esque writing (by Michael Bywater) with ARG-type interactivity.

=== The Beast ===
In 2001, in order to market the movie A.I. Artificial Intelligence directed by Steven Spielberg that finished Stanley Kubrick's unfinished project to adapt Brian Aldiss's short story "Supertoys Last All Summer Long", and also a planned series of Microsoft computer games based on the film, Microsoft's Creative Director Jordan Weisman and another Microsoft game designer, Elan Lee, conceived of an elaborate murder mystery played out across hundreds of websites, email messages, faxes, fake ads, and voicemail messages. They hired Sean Stewart, an award-winning science fiction/fantasy author, to write the story and Pete Fenlon, an experienced adventure game "worldbuilder", to serve as developer and content lead. The game, dubbed "the Citizen Kane of online entertainment" by Internet Life, was a runaway success that involved over three million active participants from all over the world during its run and would become the seminal example of the nascent ARG genre. An early asset list for the project contained 666 files, prompting the game's puppet-masters to dub it "the Beast", a name which was later adopted by players. A large and extremely active fan community called the Cloudmakers formed to analyze and participate in solving the game, and the combined intellect, tenacity and engagement of the group soon forced the puppet-masters to create new subplots, devise new puzzles, and alter elements of the design to keep ahead of the player base. Somewhat unusual for a computer-based game, the production drew players from a wide spectrum of age groups and backgrounds.

Although the Beast ran for only three months, it prompted the formation of a highly organized and intensely engaged community that remained active years after the game concluded. Perhaps more significantly, it inspired a number of its participants to create games adapting and expanding the model, extending it from an anomalous one-time occurrence to a new genre of entertainment and allowing the community to grow even after the Beast itself concluded. Members of the Cloudmakers group went on to form ARGN, the primary news source for the genre, and Unfiction, its central community hub, as well as designing the first successful and widely played indie ARGs, such as LockJaw and Metacortechs, and corporate efforts such as Perplex City.

=== Community and genre growth ===
Influenced heavily by the Beast and enthusiastic about the power of collaboration, several Cloudmakers came together with the idea that they could create a similar game. The first effort to make an independent Beast-like game, Ravenwatchers, failed, but another team soon assembled and met with greater success. With very little experience behind them, the group managed, after nine months of development, to create a viable game that was soon seized upon eagerly by the Cloudmakers group and featured in Wired magazine.

=== Massive-scale commercial games and mainstream attention ===
After the success of the first major entries in the nascent ARG genre, a number of large corporations looked to ARGs to both promote their products, and to enhance their companies' images by demonstrating their interest in innovative and fan-friendly marketing methods. To create buzz for the launch of the Xbox game Halo 2, Microsoft hired the team that had created the Beast, now operating independently as 42 Entertainment. The result, I Love Bees, departed radically from the website-hunting and puzzle-solving that had been the focus of the Beast. I Love Bees wove together an interactive narrative set in 2004, and a War of the Worlds-style radio drama set in the future, the latter of which was broken into 30–60-second segments and broadcast over ringing payphones worldwide. The game pushed players outdoors to answer phones, create and submit content, and recruit others, and received as much or a more mainstream notice than its predecessor, finding its way onto television during a presidential debate, and becoming one of The New York Times' catchphrases of 2004.

As such, I Love Bees captivated enough fans to garner significant press attention, and partly because of this publicity, Halo 2 "sold $125 million in copies the first day of release." A slew of imitators fan tributes and parodies followed. In 2005, a pair of articles profiling 42 Entertainment appeared in Game Developer magazine and the East Bay Express, both of which tied into an ARG created by the journalist and his editors.

The following spring, Audi launched The Art of the Heist, developed by Audi ad agency McKinney+Silver, Haxan Films (creators of The Blair Witch Project), to promote its new A3.

Roughly a year after I Love Bees, 42 Entertainment produced Last Call Poker, a promotion for Activision's video game Gun. Designed to help modern audiences connect with the Western genre, Last Call Poker centered on a working poker site, held games of "Tombstone Hold 'Em" in cemeteries around the United States—as well as in at least one digital venue, World of Warcraft's own virtual reality cemetery – and sent players to their own local cemeteries to clean up neglected grave sites and perform other tasks.

At the end of 2005, the International Game Developers Association ARG Special Interest Group was formed "to bring together those already designing, building, and running ARGs, in order to share knowledge, experience, and ideas for the future." More recently, an ARG was created by THQ for the game Frontlines: Fuel of War around peak oil theories where the world is in a crisis over diminishing oil resources.

In 2008, the American Art Museum hosted an alternate reality game, called Ghosts of a Chance, which was created by City Mystery. The game allowed patrons "a new way of engaging with the collection" in the Luce Foundation Center. The game ran for six weeks and attracted more than 6,000 participants.

=== Serious ARG ===
In a 2007 article, columnist Chris Dahlen (of Pitchfork Media) voiced a much-discussed ARG concept: if ARGs can spark players to solve very hard fictional problems, could the games be used to solve real-world problems? Dahlen was writing about World Without Oil, the first ARG centered on a serious near-future scenario: a global oil shortage.

In October 2008, The British Red Cross created a serious ARG called Traces of Hope to promote their campaign about civilians caught up in conflict.

The USC School of Cinematic Arts has run a semester-long ARG called Reality Ends Here for incoming freshmen since 2011. The game involves players collaborating and competing to produce media artifacts. In 2012, Reality Ends Here won the Impact Award at IndieCade, presented to games which "have social message, shift the cultural perception of games as a medium, represent a new play paradigm, expand the audience, or influence culture."

The Plan of Gauss was a game developed as a didactic strategy to enhance the learning and understanding of mathematics in university students. In this game, the players had to help characters (students) to find a missing friend.

=== New developments ===
In February 2007, Microsoft published the game Vanishing Point to promote the launch of Windows Vista. The game was designed by 42 Entertainment and, due in part to many large-scale real-world events, such as a lavish show at the Bellagio Fountain in Las Vegas as well as a prizes of a trip into space and having a winner's name engraved on all AMD Athlon 64 FX chips for a certain period of time, received large media attention.

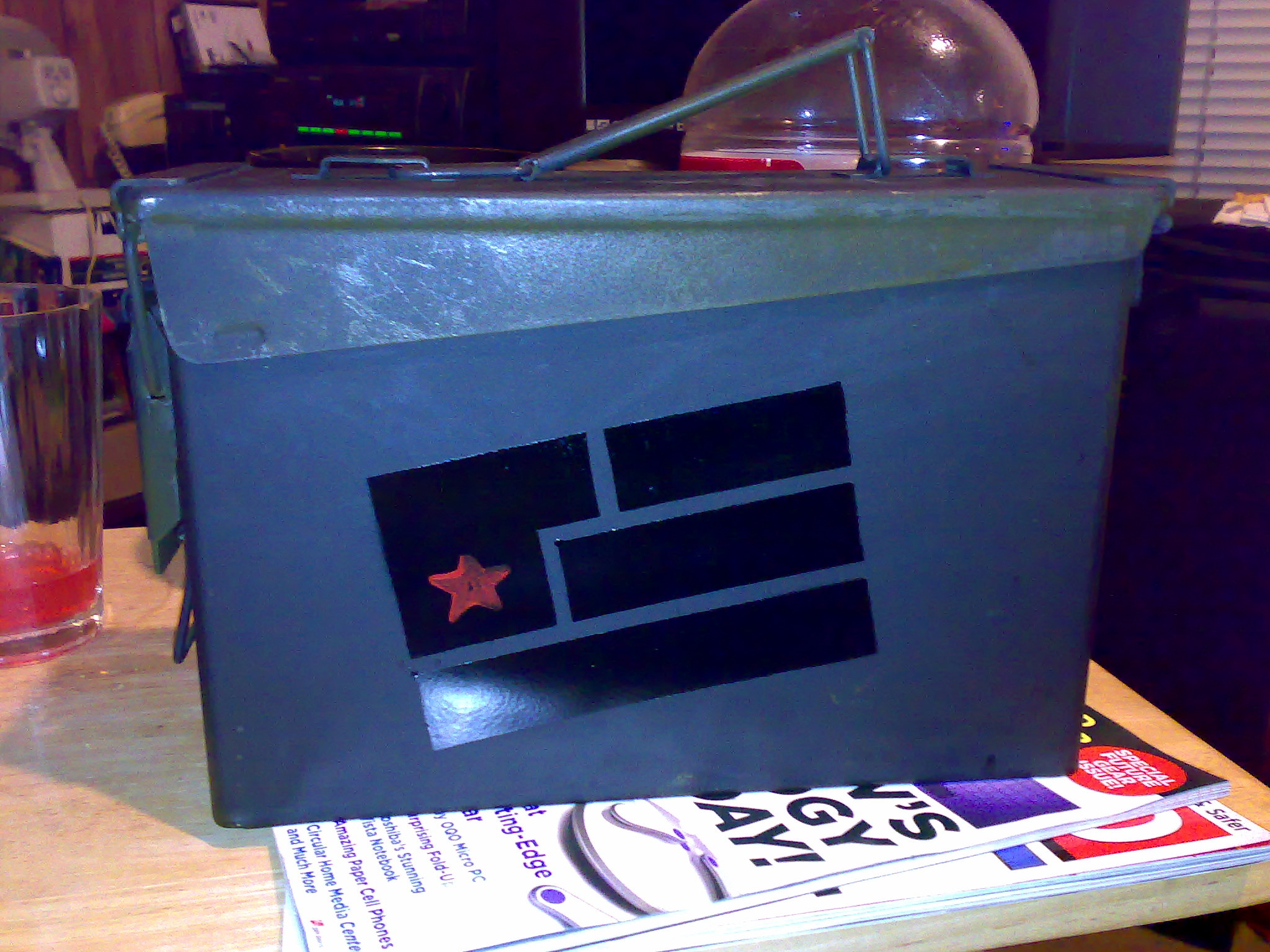
A physical prop from Year Zero

A few days later, another ARG by 42 Entertainment was released, for the release of the Nine Inch Nails album Year Zero. In that ARG, fans discovered leaked songs on thumb drives in washrooms at concerts, as well as clues to websites that describe a dystopian future occurring in 2022.

Perplex City concluded its first season by awarding a $200,000 prize to a player who found the game's missing cube. They planned to continue the ARG into a second "season" under the name Perplex City Stories without a large grand prize, but it was ultimately cancelled.

In May 2007, 42 Entertainment launched Why So Serious, an ARG to promote the feature film The Dark Knight. It played out over 15 months, concluding in July 2008. Millions of players in 177 countries participated both online and taking part in live events, and it reached hundreds of millions through Internet buzz and exposure. Notably, Why So Serious prompted a great deal of collaborative organizing and action; players went to the streets campaigning for Harvey Dent and gathered in New York City as a part of gameplay.

In March 2008, McDonald's and the IOC launched Find The Lost Ring, a global ARG promoting the 2008 Summer Olympics in Beijing, China. The game was run simultaneously in six languages with new story lines developing in each, encouraging players to communicate with residents of other countries to facilitate sharing of clues and details of the game as a whole. American track and field athlete Edwin Moses acted as a celebrity Game Master, and McDonald's Corporation promised to donate US$100,000 to Ronald McDonald House Charities China on behalf of the players.

On 1 March 2010, Valve released an update via Steam to their game Portal, adding a nondescript new achievement and some .wav files hidden within the game GCFs. The .wav files actually contained morse code and SSTV encoded images, some including certain numbers and letters. When pieced together in the correct order, these numbers and letters formed a 32-bit MD5 hash of a BBS phone number. When traced, it was found to originate from Kirkland, Washington, where Valve was based before moving to Bellevue, Washington in 2003. Accessing the number as a bulletin board system yielded large ASCII art images, all leading towards the announcement of the game's sequel, Portal 2. Later, prior to release of Portal 2 in 2011, a much more expansive ARG called the Potato Sack was run, arranged by a number of independent developers working with Valve, to simulate the re-booting of GLaDOS. The ARG resulted in the game being released several hours earlier than scheduled, among other details.

Also launched in March 2010, an ARG produced by David Varela at nDreams featured the 2008 Formula 1 World Champion Lewis Hamilton; entitled Lewis Hamilton: Secret Life, the game ran throughout the 2010 Formula 1 season, in nine languages, with live events in a dozen cities around the world.

In July 2013, Walt Disney Imagineering Research & Development and The Walt Disney Studios launched The Optimist, built around "a story of Walt Disney, the Imagineers, and other visionary thinkers and their potential involvement in a secret project that sought to build a better future." The game culminated at the D23 Expo in Anaheim, Calif., August 9–11, 2013. Players participated over a six-week period, using social media, mobile devices, and apps, while visiting locations from the story in and around Los Angeles.

An ARG accompanying the Kickstarter campaign for Frog Fractions 2 began in March 2014 and completed in 2016. Frog Fractions 2 will be the sequel to Twinbeard Studio's much acclaimed Frog Fractions, although the ARG itself is often referred to as Frog Fractions 1.5 in reference to an in-ARG puzzle solution. The ARG took about two years to solve, involving clues buried in 23 independent games and real-life locations, allowing the game, secretly already uploaded under the guise of a different game, to become unlocked in December 2016.

On the release of the expansion Afterbirth for The Binding of Isaac: Rebirth in October 2015, players discover clues hinting towards an ARG related to the game, based on the community's previous attempts to hack the game to discover any secret characters. The ARG included location information near Santa Cruz, California, where the game's developer Edmund McMillen lived. The ARG was successfully completed in November 2015, with the community working together and enabling a new character and additional content to be unlocked for the game.

Inscryption, a video game by Daniel Mullins based on a metafiction narrative, including a post-game ARG that involved real-world clues and references to Mullins' past games in conjunction with in-game materials, leading to additional narrative and endings for the game.

In December 2020, a long-unsolved puzzle from Perplex City, Billion to One, was solved. The puzzle focused on exploring the concept of six degrees of separation by presenting a man's photograph and his first name, "Satoshi", asking players to locate him. In 2020, Tom-Lucas Säger used image recognition software and located Satoshi, reporting it to Laura E. Hall, who ran the website tracking information about the hunt.

In March 2026, a viral Facebook post claimed that a plane crash had killed all six members of St. Paul, Minnesota-based bluegrass band The Gillyweeds. Subsequent investigation confirmed that there was no plane crash and that The Gillyweeds were a fictional band whose music was AI-generated. The fake band had been created by a local web designer as "a node in an indeed quite elaborate immersive story/ARG/treasure hunt", but he received criticism for fooling unsuspecting members of the public with the death hoax.

==== Television tie-ins and "extended experiences" ====
In 2006, the TV tie-in ARG began to come into its own when there was a surge of ARGs that extended the worlds of related television shows onto the Internet and into the real world. As with Push, Nevada, ABC led the way, launching three TV tie-in ARGs in 2006: Kyle XY, Ocular Effect (for the show Fallen) and The Lost Experience (for the show Lost). ABC joined with Channel 4 in the UK and Australia's Channel 7 in promoting a revamped website for The Hanso Foundation. The site was focused on a fictitious company prevalent in the storyline of the TV series, and the game was promoted through television advertisements run during Lost episodes. The Fallen Alternate Reality Game was launched in tandem with the Fallen TV movie for ABC Family and was originally conceived by Matt Wolf and created by Matt Wolf (Double Twenty Productions) in association with Xenophile Media. Wolf accepted the Emmy for The Fallen Alternate Reality Game at the 59th Annual Primetime Creative Arts Emmy Awards on September 8, 2007.

In January 2008, BBC launched "Whack the Mole" for the CBBC show M.I. High, in which viewers are asked to become M.I. High field agents and complete tasks to capture a mole that has infiltrated the organization.

On 16 March 2011, BitTorrent promoted an open licensed version of the feature film Zenith in the United States. Users who downloaded the BitTorrent client software were also encouraged to download and share Part One of three parts of the film. On 4 May 2011, Part Two of the film was made available on VODO. The episodic release of the film, supplemented by an ARG transmedia marketing campaign, created a viral effect and over a million users downloaded the movie.

In 2016, Gravity Falls creator Alex Hirsch conducted an ARG called Cipher Hunt. Hirsch started the game with the posting of an initial clue on his Twitter account, followed by the rules. It lasted from July to August 2016, and its goal was to find the clues hidden in various places around the world leading to the location of a statue of Bill Cipher. Said statue could be seen briefly after the ending credits of the series finale.

In 2022, WWE conducted an ARG based on QR Codes that randomly appeared during its weekly programming of Raw and SmackDown, as well as playing an a cappella version of "White Rabbit" by Jefferson Airplane at live events and during commercial breaks. It lasted from September to October 2022 to tease the return of Bray Wyatt.

== Awards won ==
ARGs have been recognized by the mainstream entertainment world: The Ocular Effect, an ARG promoting the TV movie The Fallen and produced in the autumn of 2007 by Xenophile Media Inc. was awarded a Primetime Emmy for Outstanding Achievement for an Interactive Television Program. Xenophile Media Inc.'s ReGenesis Extended Reality Game won an International Interactive Emmy Award in 2007 and in April 2008 The Truth About Marika won the iEmmy for Best Interactive TV service. The British Academy of Film and Television Arts recognizes Interactivity as a category in the British Academy Television Awards.

Minecraft have also held up ARGs in the term of Through the Spyglass where they held an award for the best ARG in the year and this year was "Searching For A World That Doesn't Exist" and "Destroying A World That Doesn't Exist" were in the catergory and in a hidden teaser on the show is where his inventory has lodestone, enderpearls, vines, and ice which is a synonym of Levi and now the The Searh for the Leviathan.

Likewise, Year Zero was widely heralded following its release. Such acclaim is signified in the ARG's Grand Prix Cyber Lions award, viewed as "the most prestigious of all advertising awards," at Cannes. Adweek published a quote from the selection committee on the award decision, explaining that "42 Entertainment's [viral campaign for Nine Inch Nails] impressed the jury because of its use of a variety of media, from outdoor to guerrilla to online, and how digital [media] can play a central role of a big idea campaign."

In turn, Why So Serious also won a Grand Prix Award, alongside a Webby for interactive advertising. World Without Oil was recognized for its achievements, too, earning the Activism award at the 2008 SXSW Web Awards.

Project Architeuthis, created for the U.S. Navy as a recruiting device for its cryptology division, won numerous awards, including the 2015 Warc Grand Prix for Social Strategy.

== See also ==
- List of alternate reality games
- History of alternate reality games
- Ergodic literature
- Hyperreality
- Legend tripping
- Live-action game
- Live-action virtual reality game
- Metaverse
- Mixed reality game
- Pervasive game
- Transmedia storytelling
- Transreality gaming
- Verisimilitude
- Analog horror
