= Sara Thacher =

US-based immersive designer and Disney Imagineer

- Occupations: Experience designer, Disney Imagineer
- Notable work: Star Wars: Galactic Starcruiser, The Jejune Institute, Haunted Mansion: Ghost Post, The Optimist

Sara Thacher is an American game and experience designer. She is one of the founders of the San Francisco-based immersive experience The Jejune Institute and works as a creative director and senior R&D Imagineer at Walt Disney Imagineering, including creative leadership on the Star Wars: Galactic Starcruiser two-day immersive Disney experience.

== Education ==
Thacher studied glass at the Rhode Island School of Design and earned a Masters of Fine Arts in Social Practice at the California College of the Arts.

== Career ==
Thacher was one of the creators of the multi-chapter interactive experience The Jejune Institute in San Francisco, with Jeff Hull and Uriah Findley. She served as a lead producer and experience designer for Nonchalance after answering a Craigslist recruiting ad. She is featured in the 2013 documentary about The Jejune Institute, The Institute.

She later worked for The Go Game and was a producer and designer on FutureCoast, a future forecasting game by World Without Oil's Ken Eklund that ran in February 2014. FutureCoast was funded by a grant from the National Science Foundation to Columbia University's Polar Partnership.

The game explored climate change, its effect on polar ice, and rising sea levels through a series of voicemails from the future. The game also used in-person experiences, geocached items, and social media to engage audiences.

Thacher works as a senior creative director and research and development Imagineer at Walt Disney Imagineering. Her work includes creative leadership on the Star Wars: Galactic Starcruiser two-day immersive Disney experience, the Themed Entertainment Association Award-winning Haunted Mansion: Ghost Post, and alternate reality game The Optimist, a game set around Anaheim, California and inside Disneyland that served as a promotional tie-in to the 2015 film Tomorrowland.
