= Nonchalance =

American design consultancy group

- Company type: For profit
- Industry: Games
- Founded: in San Francisco, California, United States
- Founders: Jeff Hull
- Headquarters: United States
- Website: nonchalance.com

Nonchalance began as an art collective in Oakland, California around 2002, and later in 2008 was transformed into a design consultancy group. Their work focuses on interactive, immersive art installations, which they call "situational design".

== History ==
Nonchalance was launched by Jeff Hull around 2002. Their first project was the street art campaign called Oaklandish. Original projects included a wheat-paste poster series, the "Oakland-Love Retrospective" slide show (projected onto downtown architectural landmarks), the Liberation Drive-In parking lot movie series, and the Oakslander Lakeside Gazette zine. These projects aimed to infuse cultural content into negative urban spaces during a time of rapid development in the city.

=== The Jejune Institute ===
In 2008, Nonchalance created The Jejune Institute, an alternate reality game, public art installation and immersive experience that ran in San Francisco, California, from 2008 to 10 April 2011. The Jejune Institute featured a narrative that made use of live actors, puzzles, phone calls, radio transmissions, staged protests, and interactive promenade theater. It centered on characters such as the eponymous Jejune Institute and its founder, the rebel group the Elsewhere Public Works Agency, and a rebellious young woman named Eva.

Over the course of three years, it enrolled more than 10,000 players who, responding to eccentric flyers plastered all over the city, started the game by receiving their "induction" at the fake headquarters of the institute, located in an office building in San Francisco's Financial District.

=== Latitude Society ===
In 2015, Nonchalance opened the Latitude Society, an invite-only secret society and immersive experience. It featured a clubhouse, an arcade, and regular social events. The Latitude Society closed after one year, at least partially due to an operating cost of $3,000 per day.

=== SYGNYL ===
From 2021 to 2022, Nonchalance ran a podcast called SYGNYL, "a participatory-arts podcast" inviting the audience to participate in "small collaborative acts in the real world."

=== Awards ===
The Jejune Institute won "Best World" and "Best Story" at Indiecade 2010, and "Best Alternate Reality" in the SF Bay Guardian's "Best of the Bay 2010".
