= Jeff Hull (artist) =

Oakland-based immersive artist and entrepreneur

- Born: 1969 (age 56–57)
- Other name: Bobby Peru
- Notable work: Oaklandish, The Jejune Institute
- Parent: Blair Hull

Jeff Hull (born 1969) is an artist and producer from Oakland, California. He is known for creating the Oakland-based fashion line and street art campaign Oaklandish, the immersive experiences The Jejune Institute and The Latitude Society. Hull's work was the topic of the documentaries The Institute and In Bright Axiom, and was the inspiration for the television show Dispatches from Elsewhere.

== Oaklandish ==
Oaklandish began in 2000 as a street art and viral marketing campaign designed to raise awareness about local history and culture.

Their first project was “An Oakland Love Retrospective” slide show of 130 images of the “Saints & Sinners of the Town” which was projected onto architectural landmarks downtown. Other projects included a wheatpaste street poster series, the Oakslander Lakeside Gazette independent zine, and events including the Lake Merritt Radio Regatta, the Liberation Drive-In and games of urban capture the flag at Civic Center Plaza.

From 2003 to 2005, Hull ran the Oaklandish Gallery in Oakland's produce district with artist Senay "Refa1" Dennis. It shut in 2005 after failing to obtain permits and meet city fire codes. A split between Hull and Dennis brought the popular symbol of the "rooted" oak tree into an ownership dispute.

In 2016, the store was named the 38th fastest growing inner city business in the United States by Fortune.

== The Jejune Institute ==
In 2008, Hull created The Jejune Institute with Sara Thacher and Uriah Findley, an alternate reality game, public art installation and immersive experience that ran in San Francisco, California from 2008 to 10 April 2011.

In 2013, a documentary about the project was released by Spencer McCall, titled “The Institute.” It suggested that The Jejune Institute “combined a Fluxus stunt, a freelance crowd-psychology experiment, a ludic self-help workshop, interactive promenade theatre, and some traditional hipster bullshit.”

Over the course of three years, it enrolled more than 10,000 players who, responding to eccentric flyers plastered all over the city, started the game by receiving their "induction" at the fake headquarters of the Institute, located in an office building in San Francisco's Financial District. The Jejune Institute received the Best Alternative Reality award from the San Francisco Bay Guardian. It also received the Best Story and Best World awards at Indiecade.

== Film and TV series ==
Hull's project The Jejune Institute was the subject of the 2013 documentary film The Institute directed by Spencer McCall.

The television show Dispatches from Elsewhere created by Jason Segel is based on the documentary and Segel's experience going through Hull's project The Latitude Society.

== Other work ==
Jeff Hull created the “I Fly Oak” logo for the Oakland International Airport.

Hull also developed The Latitude Society, a project, that combined a secret society, art, and game elements. It was the subject of a documentary film titled In Bright Axiom, directed by Spencer McCall and executive produced by Hull.

In 2025 Hull debuted The Cortège, a live performance in Burbank, California described as "A Festive Funeral for Our Times."

== Filmography ==
Title	Type	Year	Executive Producer	Writer	Art director	Ref
Battleground: 21 Days on the Empire’s Edge	Documentary film	2004	Yes	No	No	
American Blackout	Documentary film	2006	Yes	No	No	
The Institute	Documentary film	2012	No	Yes	Yes	
In Bright Axiom	Documentary film	2019	Yes	Yes	Yes	
Dispatches from Elsewhere	Television series	2020	Yes	Yes	No	
