= Harry the Bunny =

American children's television show

- Genre: Children's television series; Educational
- Opening theme: He’s Harry
- Country of origin: United States
- Original language: English
- No. of seasons: 2
- No. of episodes: 55

Production
- Running time: 5 minutes
- Production company: BabyFirst Productions

Original release
- Network: BabyFirstTV
- Release: March 6, 2008 – May 3, 2010

Related
- Harry & Larry: Pros Who Help!

Harry the Bunny is an American children's television series that premiered in 2008 on the BabyFirst network.

== Plot ==
Every day, there is an opportunity to discover something new to share with the viewers. From his colorful bedroom to the adventures of his backyard, Harry, a 3-year old bunny has plenty to do and learn. Sometimes his adventures incorporate skills such as counting and recognizing letters. On other times, kids learn about emotions.

Harry usually greets the viewers with 'Hello little ones' or 'Hello everybody' or 'Hello funny bunnies'.

== Transmission guide ==
A total of 55 editions published on 6 March 2008 to 3 May 2010 for five minute episode including education.

- Season 1; 34 episodes: 6 March 2008 - 14 December 2009
- Season 2; 21 episodes: 9 February 2010 - 3 May 2010

== Crossover series ==
Harry & Larry: Pros who Help! is a crossover show that co-stars Harry and a 2D animated macaw named Larry, who also stars in a show aired on the same channel, "VocabuLarry". The show teaches education learning about new words and commonly known jobs, such as teaching, being a doctor, firefighter, musician, carpenter, cowboy, conductor, or an artist.

== Merchandising ==
BabyFirst's store sells Harry the Bunny plush toys.

== Home media ==
Mill Creek Entertainment distributes DVDs of Harry the Bunny along with other shows in the BabyFirst DVDs collection.

== Reception ==
Business Wire judged that "The show fosters language development in a fun, age-appropriate way." while Romper stated "Harry is a super curious 3-year-old bunny who loves exploring new things, just like your own little tot. Let them explore together by watching this charming series with darling graphics and sweet stories."
