= California Street (San Francisco) =

Thoroughfare in San Francisco, California

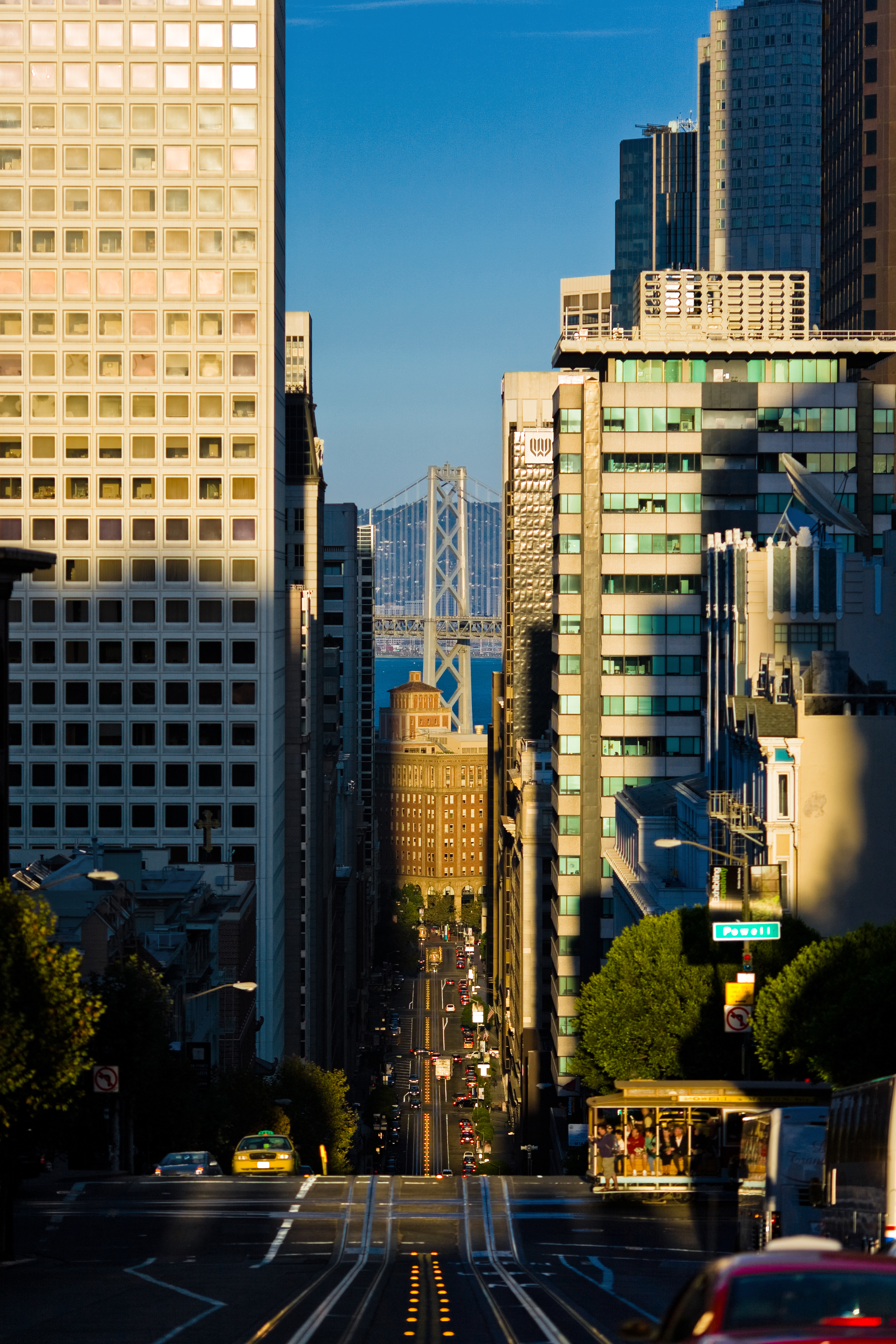
- View from the top of California Street Looking towards the financial district with the Bay Bridge in the background
- Interactive map of California Street
- Length: 5.22 mi (8.40 km)
- Location: San Francisco
- Coordinates: 37.791761°N 122.411739°W
- East end: Market Street, Main Street, and Drumm Street
- West end: 32nd Avenue

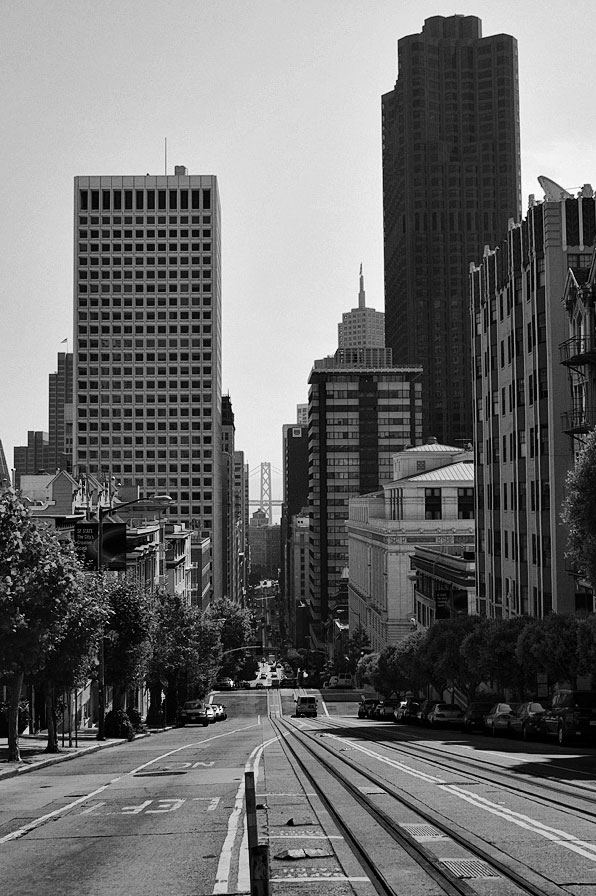
California Street to Oakland Bay Bridge.

California Street is a major thoroughfare in San Francisco, California. It is one of the longest streets in San Francisco, and includes a number of important landmarks. It runs in an approximately straight 5.2 mi (8.4 km) east–west line from the Financial District to Lincoln Park on the West Side of the city.

== Description ==
California Street begins at the intersection of Market Street, Main Street, and Drumm Street in front of the Hyatt Regency Embarcadero Center, one block from the Ferry Building, then travels through Chinatown, over Nob Hill, through Lower Pacific Heights, Laurel Heights, and the Lake District. The street makes a slight bend at 8th Avenue, then parallels the edge of the Presidio of San Francisco through the Richmond District until its dead end terminus just west of 32nd Avenue, at Lincoln Park.

Fifty-four blocks of California Street, from Van Ness Avenue westward to the dead end past 32nd Avenue, comprised the last major leg of the final 1928 alignment of the Lincoln Highway, the first road across America, leading out to the highway's western terminus in Lincoln Park.

The route has four to six lanes for its entire length. A cable car line runs on the eastern portion from Market to Van Ness Avenue and a trolleybus line runs on the western portion between Steiner and 32nd Avenue. The cable car line on California Street was first opened to the public on April 10, 1878. As of 2026, the California line remains popular with local residents, offering views of the Transamerica Pyramid and downtown, as well the San Francisco Bay Bridge, as it takes passengers straight uphill.

== Landmarks and points of interest ==
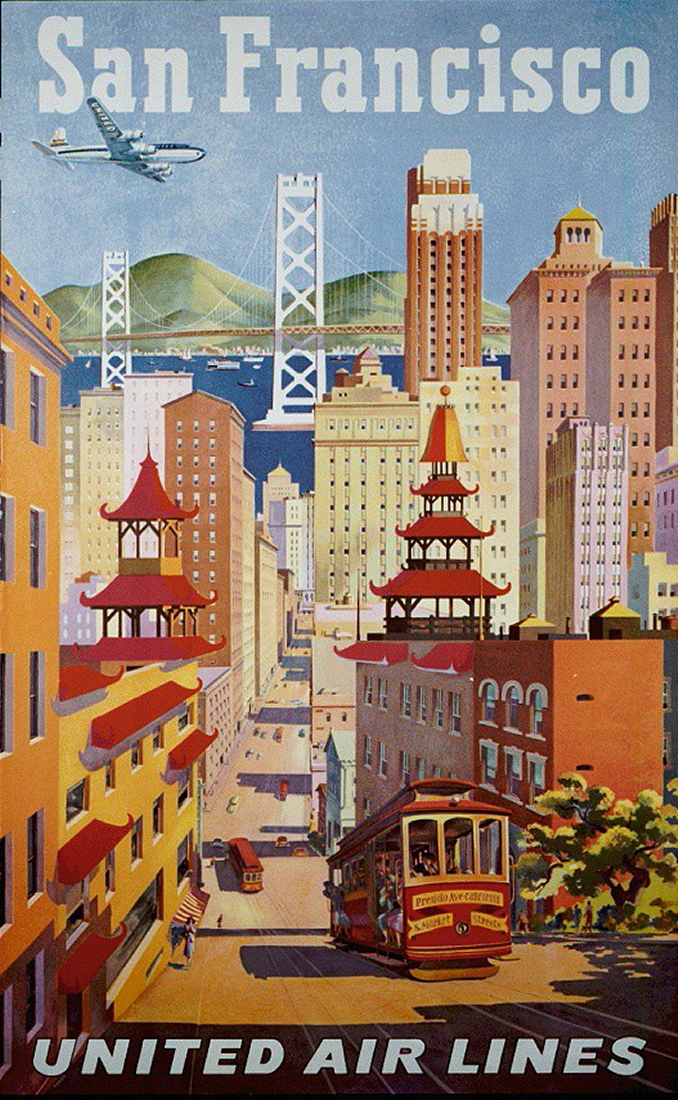
United

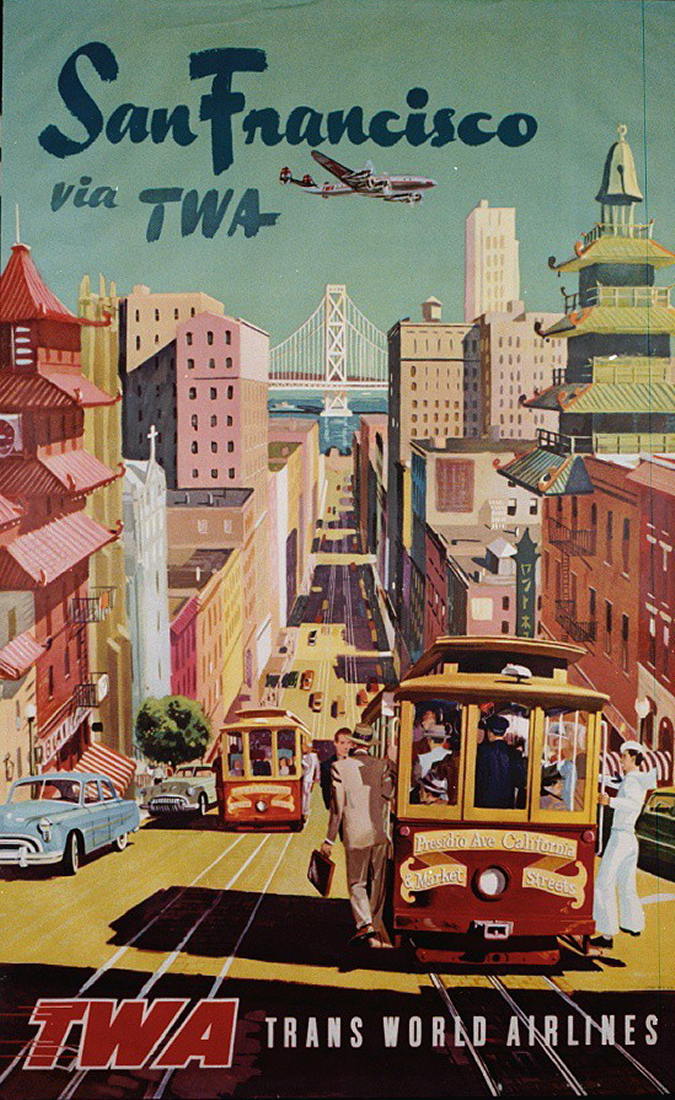
TWA

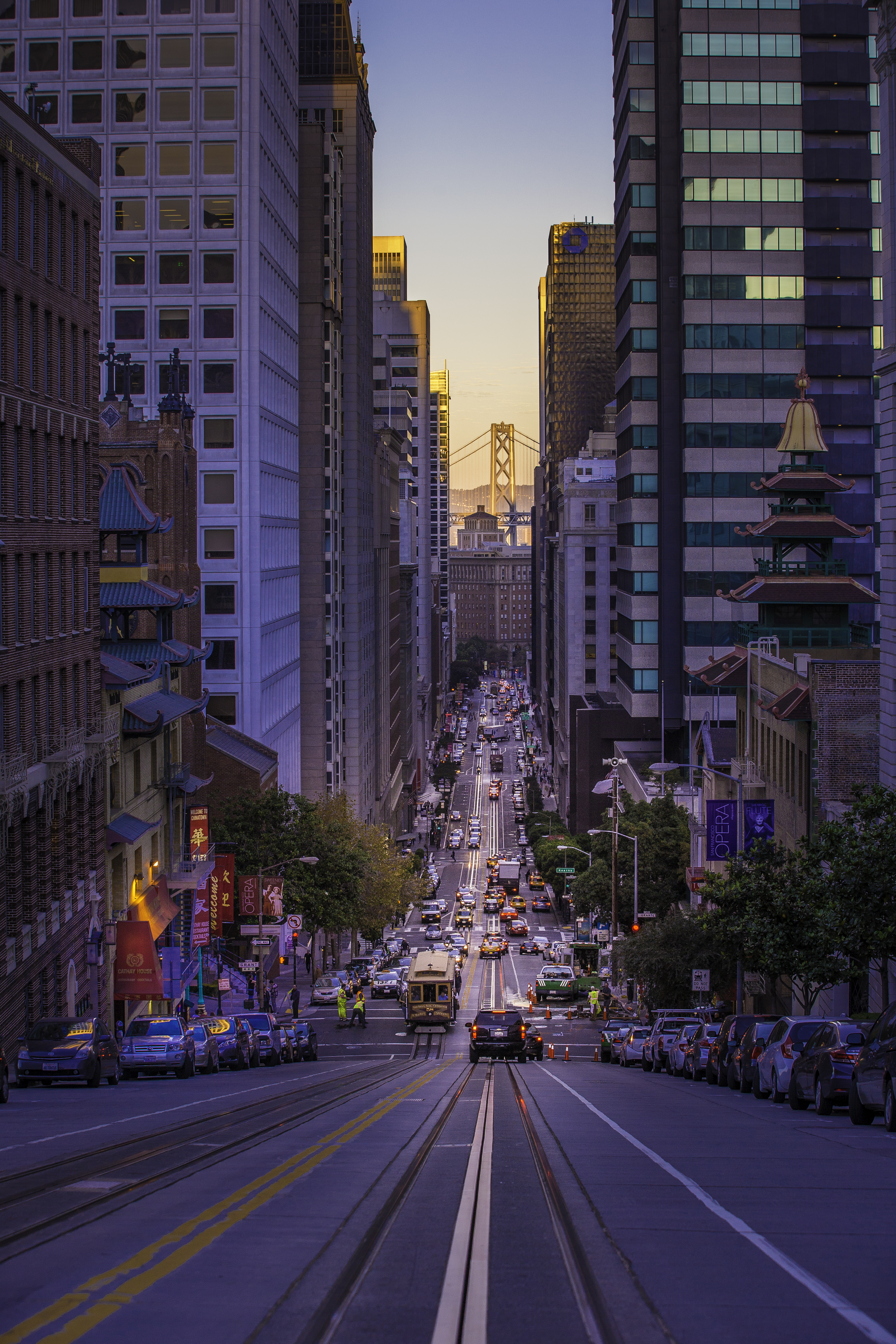
Photo for comparison

Vintage airline posters of San Francisco, featuring cable cars, looking east from approximately the intersection of California and Stockton towards San Francisco Bay and the western span of the Bay Bridge. A 2016 photograph with a similar perspective is included to illustrate the prominence of skyscrapers in the present-day Financial District.
- Embarcadero Center
- 50 California Street
- 101 California Street
- 150 California Street
- 345 California Center (Loews Regency San Francisco)
- 400 California Street (Bank of California Building)
- 465 California Street (Merchants Exchange Building)
- 555 California Street (Bank of America Center)
- 580 California Street
- 650 California Street (Hartford Building)
- Sing Chong and Sing Fat buildings at Grant and California, in Chinatown
- 600 Stockton (Ritz Carlton hotel)
- 905 California Street (Stanford Court Hotel)
- 800 Powell Street (University Club)
- Fairmont Hotel
- 999 California Street (Mark Hopkins Hotel )
- 1000 California Street (Pacific-Union Club), the former Flood Mansion
- 1075 California Street (Huntington Hotel)
- 1111 California Street (Masonic Auditorium)
- Huntington Park
- Grace Cathedral
- California Pacific Medical Center

== In popular culture ==
Two novels are named for San Francisco's California Street: California Street (1959) by Niven Busch, which documents the rise of a publishing magnate; and California Street (1990) by Donna Levin. Levin's novel is the story of a psychoanalyst searching for a missing woman. Both novels use "California Street" as a metaphor for the milieu in which the stories unfold.

== See also ==
- Cable car (railway)
- Fillmore District
- San Francisco Municipal Railway
