= ABPA =

ABPA may refer to:

- Allergic bronchopulmonary aspergillosis, a condition characterised by an exaggerated response of the immune system
- American Benefit Plan Administrators, a US-based employee benefits administration firm
