= Chime (company) =

American financial services company

Chime Financial, Inc.

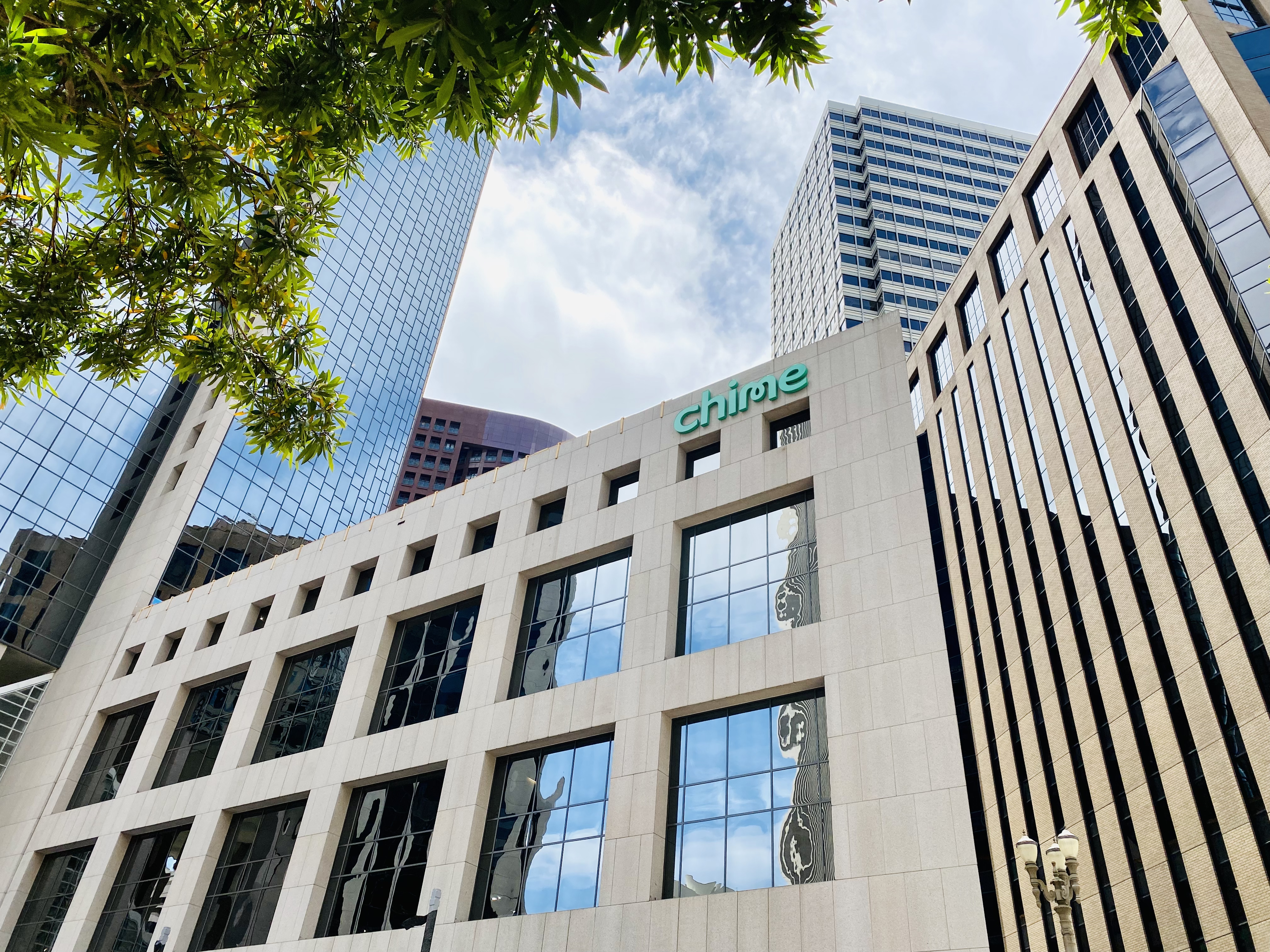
- Headquarters in San Francisco, California
- Type: Public
- Traded as: Nasdaq: CHYM (Class A); S&P 400 component
- Industry: Financial services
- Founded: 2012; 14 years ago
- Founders: Chris Britt and Ryan King
- Headquarters: 101 California Street; San Francisco, California, United States
- Key people: Chris Britt (CEO); Ryan King (Co-Founder)
- Products: Checking accounts, savings accounts, debit cards, P2P, credit cards, fee-free overdraft
- Revenue: ▲US$2.2 billion (2025)
- Net income: ▼US$45 million (2025)
- Website: chime.com

Chime Financial, Inc. is an American financial technology company based in San Francisco, California. It provides fee-free mobile banking services through partnerships with two national banks, Stride Bank and The Bancorp Bank. The company offers fee-free checking and savings accounts, debit cards, and other financial products through its mobile application.

Chime was founded in 2012 by Chris Britt and Ryan King and began services in 2014. The company has grown through features like early access to direct deposits, earned wage access, fee-free overdraft services, and interest-free secured credit cards. It became publicly traded on the Nasdaq in June 2025.

== History ==
Chime was founded by Chris Britt and Ryan King in 2012 in San Francisco, California, as an alternative to traditional banking to serve less affluent communities and people living paycheck to paycheck. The company launched on April 15, 2014, on the Dr. Phil Show.

One of Chime's early growth drivers was its introduction of early paycheck access, which advanced funds to customers based on ACH payment notifications rather than waiting for official settlement.

In January 2020, Chime announced a partnership with the Dallas Mavericks as their jersey sponsor as a part of a multi-year deal. Chime had 8 million account holders in February 2020.

In April 2020, in response to the financial strain of the COVID-19 pandemic, Chime announced a pilot program to provide users who e-filed tax returns with the IRS a $1,200 advance on the Economic Stimulus Payment via SpotMe, Chime's fee-free overdraft product. Chime later announced the successful processing of over $375 million in stimulus payments one week before the scheduled government disbursement date.

In August 2021, Chime Financial raised $750 million in a series G funding round, led by investor Sequoia Capital Global Equities, giving the company a valuation of about $25 billion.

In September 2021, Chime leased 192,000 square feet of office space across six floors in a San Francisco building owned by Hines.

In 2022, Chime was named one of Fortune's Best Places to Work. According to a report by Forbes, Chime had planned to hold an initial public offering (IPO) in March 2022. The company delayed its IPO, however, in February 2022. Chime laid off 160 positions, equalling 12% of its workforce, in November 2022.

Chime's revenue in 2023 was approximately $1.3 billion. The company's customers were largely made up of young Americans with incomes ranging from $35,000 to $65,000 annually.

By May 2024, the company, which operated under a hybrid work model, reported having 1,300 employees and 7 million customers. At the time, it was processing $8 billion worth of transactions monthly. Chime was also named to the 2024 CNBC Disruptor 50 list.

Chime issued publicly traded stock on the Nasdaq exchange under the ticker symbol “CHYM” in June 2025. Chime went public on June 12 after raising $864 million in its IPO, valuing the company at $18.4 billion.

As of October 2025, Chime has an 'A+' rating from the Better Business Bureau (BBB), with 8,000 customer complaints during the previous 3 years.

In February 2026, Chime entered a multi-year partnership with Major League Soccer, becoming the league's official retail banking, credit card, and debit card partner. In April 2026, Chime was named among “America’s Most Trustworthy Companies” by Newsweek as well as ranked on Time100’s “Most Influential Companies”.

In September 2026, Chime agreed to acquire Stride Bank, N.A., its banking partner since 2019, for $590 million in cash. The transaction is structured as an acquisition of Central Service Corporation, Stride's parent company. If completed, Stride will become Chime Bank, N.A., a wholly owned subsidiary of Chime. The transaction is expected to close in the first half of 2027, subject to regulatory and other approvals.

=== Operations ===
Chime is not a bank. It is able to offer its services via its relationships with banks; customer funds are routed to a chartered bank. FDIC insurance of up to $250,000 is available to users via the partnered banks, not directly through Chime, so customers are not protected against some failures. Chime has no physical branches and does not charge monthly or overdraft fees, nor does it require an opening deposit or minimum balance to open a free checking account. Accounts are only available to individuals; all money received must be in the name of the individual account owner. Customers cannot appeal to banking regulators to retrieve their deposits, which may not be returned in a timely fashion. Most of its revenue comes from interchange fees on debit card transactions.

== Products ==
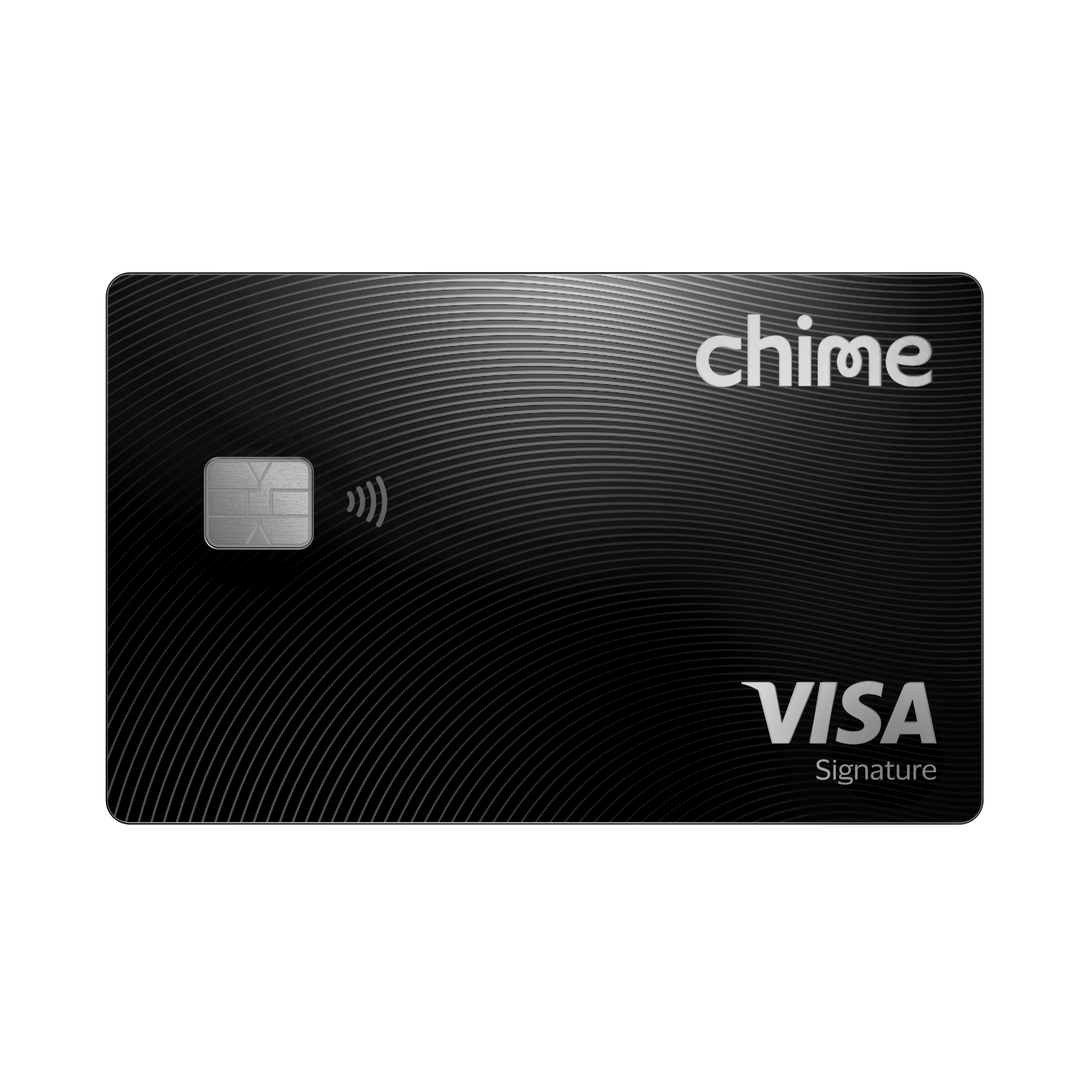
Chime Onyx Card

Chime's platform offers early access to paychecks, negative account balances without overdraft fees, high-yield savings accounts, peer-to-peer payment services, short term and pre-approved instant loans, and an interest-free secured credit card. It does not charge monthly service fees or overdraft fees, or require minimum balances. Chime also offers federal and state tax filing services on its app. Employees have access to these benefits through its Chime Workplace program.

=== Fee-free overdraft protection ===
In September 2019, Chime launched SpotMe, a fee-free overdraft service that allows customers to overdraw their accounts by up to $100 without incurring a fee; once the overdraft limit is reached, purchases will be declined but no fees charged.

=== Chime Card ===
In June 2020, Chime launched Credit Builder, a credit card designed to help consumers build their credit history. Chime was the most downloaded digital banking app in the U.S. during the first half of 2021, according to Apptopia.

In September 2025, Chime retired the Credit Builder card and introduced the Chime Card, a no-annual-fee secured credit card that offers cash-back rewards on purchases. The Chime Card expands on the former Credit Builder's features and doesn't charge interest or require a credit check for approval.

=== MyPay ===
In 2024, Chime launched MyPay, an earned wage access (EWA) product that allows users to access up to $500 of wages before payday. MyPay has no mandatory fees or interest and does not require a credit check.

=== Memberships ===
==== Chime Plus ====
In March 2025, the company introduced Chime Plus, a membership tier that provides additional benefits to customers who receive qualifying direct deposits into their Chime accounts.

==== Chime Prime ====
In April 2026, Chime announced the launch of Chime Prime, a premium membership tier offering rewards, including 5% cash back, to members who receive at least $3,000 in qualifying direct deposits each month.

=== Chime Invest ===
In July 2026, Chime launched Chime Invest, which integrates commission-free stock investments and exchange-traded funds (ETFs) into the existing app. The feature allows users to make investments as low as $1 and choose between self-directed or expert-managed portfolios.

=== Chime Workplace ===
Chime Workplace is an enterprise financial wellness suite that provides employees with fee-free banking, earned wage access, and savings tools through their employer. The platform targets hourly workers, extending Chime's consumer banking services into the workplace as an employee benefit.

== Social Impact ==
The Chime Scholars Foundation was founded in 2022, providing low-income students with scholarships up to $20,000 per degree or $5,000 annually. Chime pledges 1% of the company’s equity towards this program. The 2024-2025 school year recipient class was its largest ever, offering scholarships to 440 students.

== Consumer and regulatory problems ==
=== Marketing as a bank ===
Chime, which is not a bank, in 2021 came to agreements with two state financial regulators, the California Department of Financial Protection and Innovation and the Illinois Department of Financial and Professional Regulation, to stop representing itself as a bank. The company agreed to stop using the URL "chimebank.com", change its use of the word "bank" in marketing, and add disclaimers to its marketing and product text. It paid $200,000 in the settlement with Illinois.

=== Account closures, difficulty recovering deposits ===
Chime can close user accounts without notice, as it is not required to give customers a reason for the cancellation. Chime's partner banks have a duty under "know your customer" rules to guard against money laundering or other suspicious activity, including by closing down suspicious accounts.

In July 2021, ProPublica published an article detailing Chime's record of closing customer accounts without notice or explanation, sometimes refusing to return customer deposits. Chime has said the closures were an accidental byproduct of fraud prevention.

In November 2022, Chime's practice of closing customer accounts without notice or explanation was again reported. As of November 2022, the Consumer Financial Protection Bureau had received 3,500 complaints about Chime since 2020. Customers with closed accounts sometimes had difficulty retrieving their deposits in a timely fashion. Since Chime customers are not customers of any bank, their recourse is often limited.

In 2024, the CFPB assessed a $3.25 million penalty plus at least $1.3 million in redress to customers for not returning deposits from closed accounts in a timely manner. Until 2021 Chime's customer service agreement said deposits would be issued by check within 14 days. Thousands of customers waited 90 days or longer. The settlement gives at least $150 in redress to any customer who had a $10 balance after 14 days from account closure. The $3.25 million penalty was paid to the CFPB victims relief fund. Chime blamed the problem on a "configuration error" in 2020 and 2021.

=== Handling customer complaints ===
In 2024 Chime entered into a consent order with the California Department of Financial Protection and Innovation (DFPI) and paid a $2.5 million penalty to resolve an investigation into the company's customer service. The DFPI found that customer complaints were not being handled fairly, accurately, and in a timely manner in compliance with the California Consumer Financial Protection law. Chime agreed to provide 24-hour, 7-day customer service support with sufficient training and staffing to be in compliance, and to report on its compliance to DFPI for two years.

== See also ==
- Challenger bank
- Financial technology
- Payment card industry
