= The Optimist (alternate reality game) =

Alternate reality game by Disney

The Optimist was a 2013 alternate reality game created by Walt Disney Imagineering as a tie-in to the 2015 film Tomorrowland directed by Brad Bird. The game was set in and around Anaheim, California and the Disneyland theme park and ran for six weeks from July 3, 2013, to August 11, 2013, with a finale event at the 2013 D23 Expo fan convention. The story was about a fictional alternate history of Walt Disney and his involvement in a secret society connected to the 1964 World's Fair and an optimistic vision of the future.

== Background ==
The game was created by Walt Disney Imagineering. Imagineer Sara Thacher provided creative direction.

== Fictional story ==
The game began on July 3, 2013, with the blog of a fictional college student named Amelia whose grandfather Carlos Moreau had worked with Walt Disney. Players learned about a mysterious group called "Plus Ultra", which was founded in 1889 and included Gustave Eiffel, Jules Verne, Thomas Edison, Nikola Tesla, and Walt Disney.

In this alternate history, Carlos Moreau sold a short story called Orbit's Story to Disney and collaborated with Disney's Special Projects team on the 1964 World's Fair.

A fictional artist named Wallace shared maps of the park and sent postcards to participants. He had a booth at the 2013 D23 Expo fan convention as part of the game's finale event.

== Gameplay ==
Clues were revealed through character blogs. Amelia posted scans and articles for her grandfather, including a phone number connected to a fictional construction company. Other clues led to real-world locations, like a scanned napkin that directed players to the real-life Tam O'Shanter Inn, one of Walt Disney's favorite restaurants. Players were also invited to the private restaurant Club 33 inside Disneyland to have conversations with the character Wallace to learn more about the history of the secret society.

Through Wallace's blog, players found maps and clues that led to hidden clues at Disneyland. One clue was hidden on a girder above the "Tomorrowland" monorail platform in an ink that was only visible when using a camera flash. Wallace invited players to a live chat with Imagineer Bob Gurr.

For the last event before the game finale, 100 players met for a tour of Walt Disney's private apartment on Main Street, U.S.A.

== D23 Expo ==
The finale of The Optimist took place from 9–11 August 2013 at the D23 Expo fan convention. Tomorrowland co-writers Brad Bird and Damon Lindelof did a presentation in which they shared a fake picture of Walt Disney and a "newly found" animation that described the secret society "Plus Ultra".

Players could meet with the fictional character Wallace at his booth at the 2013 D23 Expo fan convention. If they gave him the correct secret code, he would tell them about Walt Disney's vision of the future, and give them a stylized map of Disneyland. Players had to work together inside the theme park by combining their maps, which led to a finale inside the Main Street Cinema.

A film inside the cinema revealed a final message from members of the secret society, welcoming the players as its newest members. The players received special commemorative pins.
