= Lorry I. Lokey =

American businessman (1927–2022)

- Born: March 27, 1927; Portland, Oregon, U.S.
- Died: October 1, 2022 (aged 95); Atherton, California, U.S.
- Education: Stanford University
- Occupation: Businessman
- Title: Chairman & CEO, Business Wire

Lorry I. Lokey (March 27, 1927 – October 1, 2022) was an American businessperson and philanthropist. A native of Portland, Oregon, he founded the company Business Wire in 1961 and donated in excess of $700 million to charities, with the majority of the money given to schools. He resided in San Francisco during his later years.

== Early life ==
Lorry Lokey was born on March 27, 1927, in Portland, Oregon, and raised in the Northeast Portland neighborhood of Alameda during the Depression. His Jewish family practiced charity, setting the example for Lokey. He attended Alameda Elementary School in Portland, then graduated from Grant High School before being drafted into the United States Army, then deployed to Japan during the final months of World War II. While in the service he worked on the Pacific Stars & Stripes as an editor after the war ended.

Lokey resumed college in 1947, having been drafted into the army in 1944, following his freshman year, graduating from Stanford University in Palo Alto, California, with a Bachelor of Arts degree in journalism. At Stanford, he worked on The Stanford Daily, becoming editor of the school newspaper in 1949. Upon graduation Lokey began working for United Press, now United Press International (UPI), and then at newspapers and in the public relations field. One newspaper he worked for was The Daily News in Longview, Washington.

== Business career ==
Inspired by the sight of a teletype machine transferring financial news during a conference in Los Angeles, Lokey started Business Wire, a news release service, in 1961. Founded in San Francisco, California, the company started with seven clients on the first day of business. The company expanded and became an international wire service with 30 offices around the world. By 2003, the company had grown to 450 employees with annual revenue of $110 million. In 2006, Lokey sold Business Wire for approximately $600 million to Berkshire Hathaway, Warren Buffett's corporation.

== Philanthropy ==
Lokey began donating large sums of money to charities in 1990. By 2007, he had donated more than $400 million, of which 98 percent was given to secondary and post-secondary education. Some schools include the University of Oregon, Mills College, Stanford University, the Technion, Santa Clara University, Bellarmine College Preparatory, and Portland State University. These efforts led to his listing as one of the ten highest donors in the United States by the Chronicle of Philanthropy in 2006. He was also an early signer of The Giving Pledge. During his lifetime, Lokey donated over 90% of his fortune, exceeding US$700 million. He was the University of Oregon's 2017-2018 honorary degree recipient.

In 2018, he donated $10 million to the University of Haifa for the construction of a new building in downtown Haifa, Israel.

As of June 2014, Lokey had also donated a total of $139.9 million to the University of Oregon in Eugene. This includes a $74.5 million donation in 2007 that was the second most ever given to the school, and the largest donation designated for academics. The 2007 donation went towards the creation of the Lorry I. Lokey Science Advancement and Graduate Education Initiative.

In October 2008, the Stanford School of Medicine announced that Lokey would donate $75 million for a research facility. The facility is named the Lorry I. Lokey Stem Cell Research Building. He also donated money to establish a new chemistry building at the Ben-Gurion University of the Negev in Israel.

== Personal life ==
Lokey had three daughters. He died in Atherton, California, on October 1, 2022, at age 95.
