= Stanford Court Hotel =

Hotel in San Francisco, California

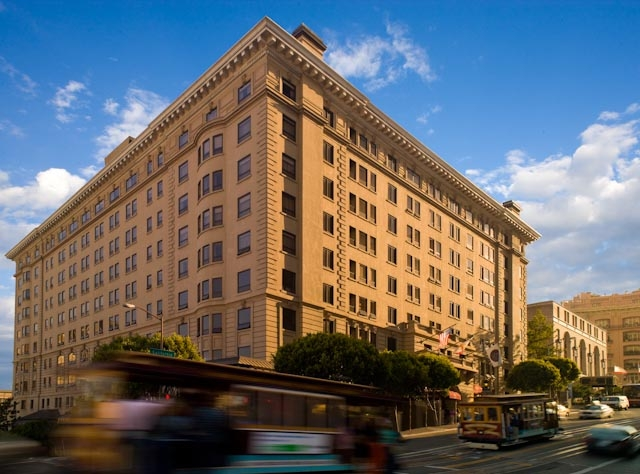
- Interactive map of the Stanford Court Hotel area

General information
- Location: United States, 905 California Street; San Francisco, California
- Coordinates: 37.7915°N 122.4095°W
- Opening: 1972

Technical details
- Floor count: 8

Other information
- Number of rooms: 393
- Number of suites: 26
- Number of restaurants: Aurea
- Parking: US$8 hourly / US$72 daily

Website
- http://www.stanfordcourt.com

The Stanford Court Hotel is a historic 393-room hotel located at 905 California Street on Nob Hill in San Francisco, California. The hotel sits at the intersection of California & Powell St, where the city's cable car lines also intersect.

== History ==
In 1876, railroad tycoon and industrialist Leland Stanford built a mansion on the site at a cost of $2 million. Stanford spared little expense on the construction or decor, the mansion was legendary for its luxury and magnificent art collection. The two acre property was surrounded by a grand wall of basalt and granite, topped with a wrought iron fence. Part of that original wall and carefully restored fence can still be seen on the eastern side of the present day Stanford Court Hotel. The Stanford mansion, considered among the most elegant in the nation was destroyed in the fire after the 1906 San Francisco earthquake.

The site was purchased by real estate investor Lucien H. Sly, and in 1912 the luxurious Stanford Court Apartments were established, quickly becoming among the city's most fashionable residences. The structure was sold in 1968 and completely gutted and rebuilt as a luxury hotel, opening in March 1972 as The Stanford Court, run by hoteliers James A. Nassikas and Edgar Stern. The hotel was purchased by Stouffer Hotels in 1988 and became the Stouffer Stanford Court Hotel. In 1993, Stouffer Hotels was purchased by New World Development and all Stouffer hotels were placed within their Renaissance Hotels division, with the hotel becoming the Stouffer Renaissance Stanford Court Hotel. The Stouffer branding was retired in 1996 and the hotel became the Renaissance Stanford Court Hotel. In November 2008, the hotel completed a US$35 million renovation. The hotel left Renaissance in 2013 and became independent as the Stanford Court Hotel. It is currently managed by Highgate Hotels.
