= The Institute (2012 film) =

2012 documentary film

- Directed by: Spencer McCall
- Starring: Arye Bender; Boston Blake; Jeff Hull
- Distributed by: Argot Pictures
- Release date: October 11, 2012
- Running time: 92 minutes
- Country: United States
- Language: English

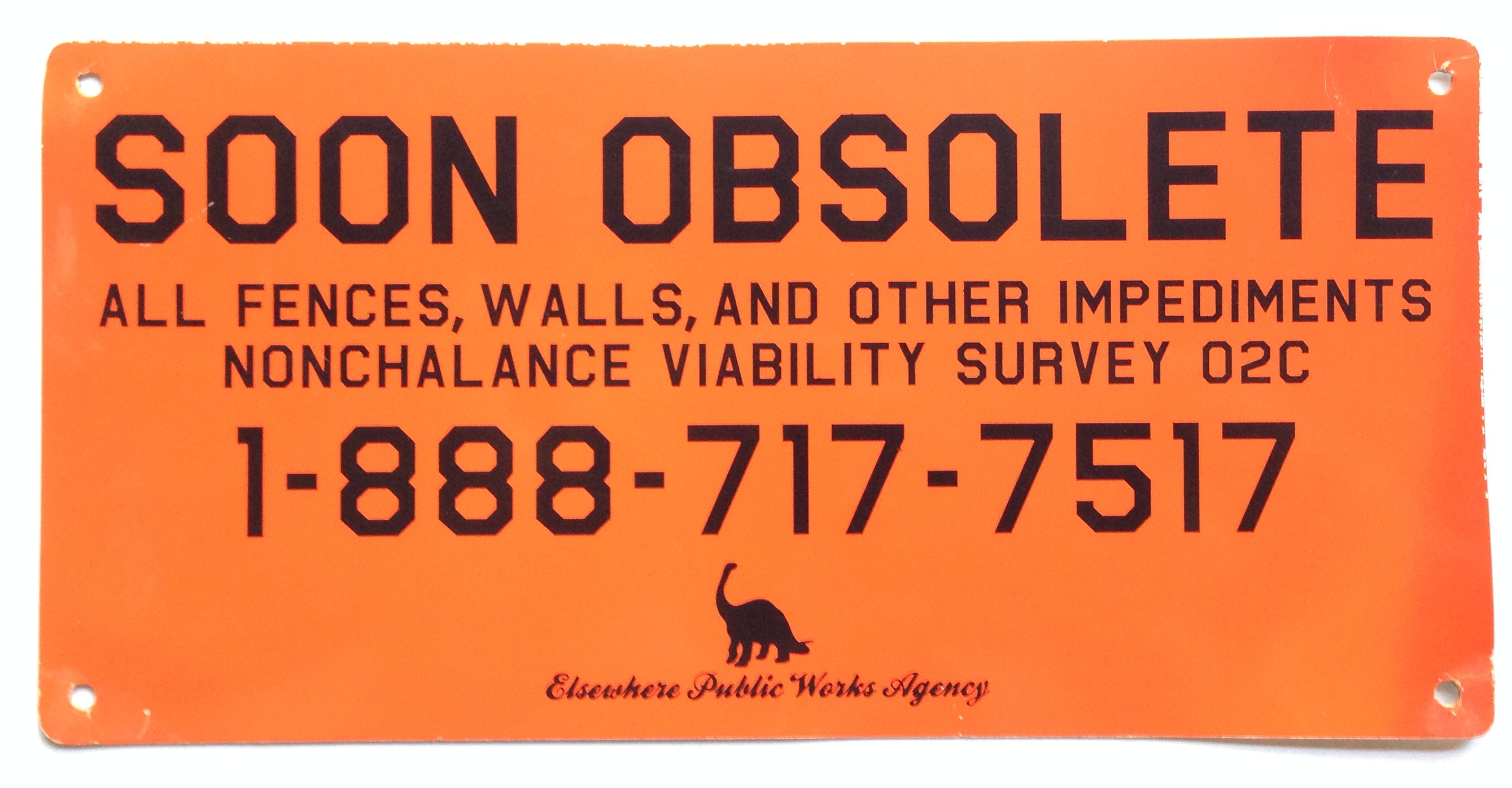
A metal sign made for the fictitious "Elsewhere Public Works" as part of alternate reality game The Jejune Institute

The Institute is a 2012 documentary film directed by Spencer McCall reconstructing the story of The Jejune Institute, an alternate reality game set in San Francisco, through interviews with the participants and the creators. The game was produced in 2008 by Oakland-based artist Jeff Hull. Over the course of three years, it enrolled more than 10,000 players who, responding to eccentric flyers plastered all over the city, started the game by receiving their "induction" at the fake headquarters of the Institute, located in an office building in San Francisco's Financial District.

The series Dispatches from Elsewhere is based on this documentary film.
