= 101 California Street =

San Francisco skyscraper

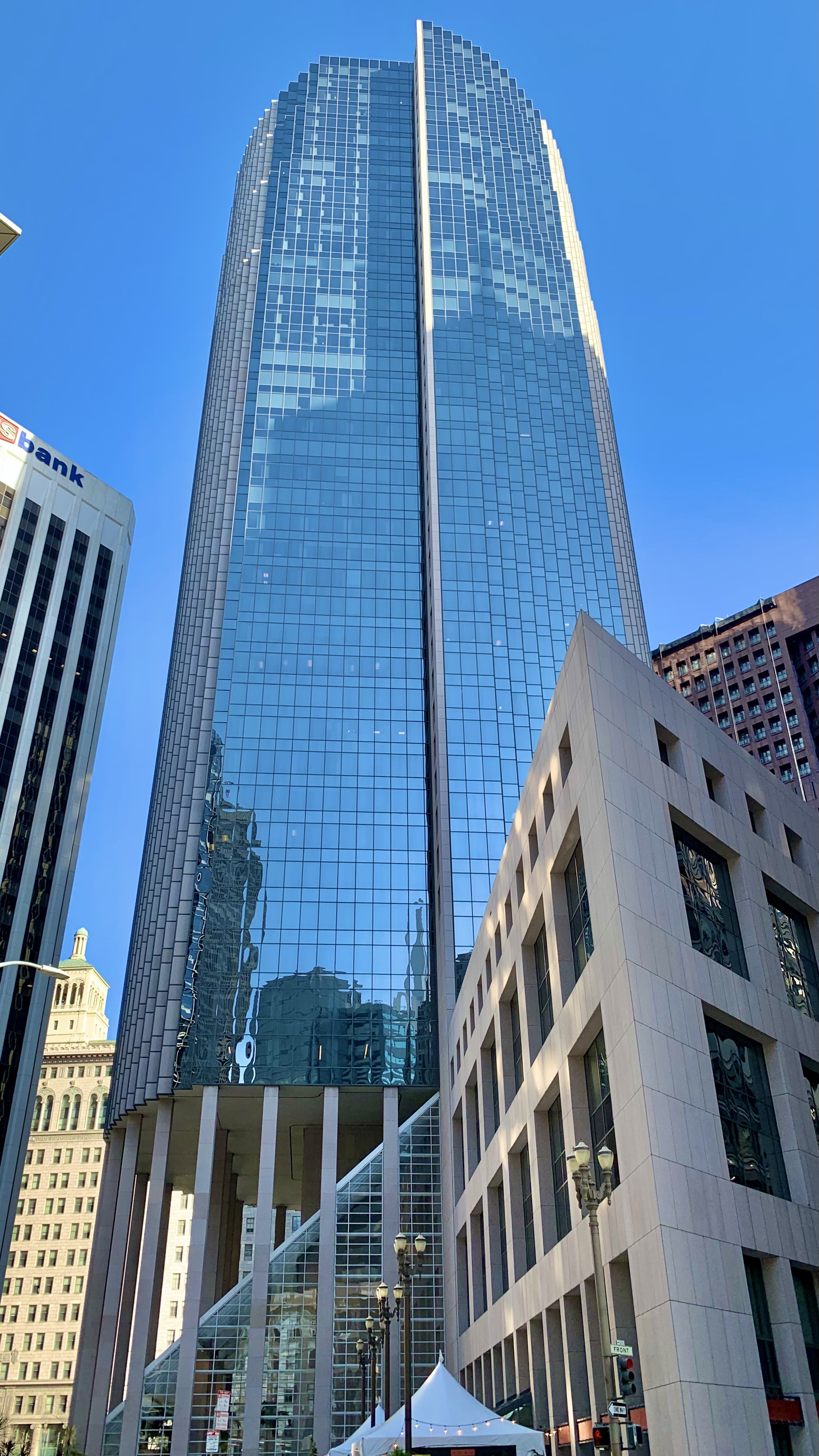
- In 2021

- Location within San Francisco Location within California Location within the United States
- Former names: Itel Building

General information
- Type: Commercial offices
- Location: 101 California Street; San Francisco, California
- Coordinates: 37.79285°N 122.39793°W
- Construction started: 1979
- Completed: 1982
- Owner: Hines Interests Limited Partnership
- Operator: Hines Interests Limited Partnership

Height
- Roof: 183 m (600 ft)

Technical details
- Floor count: 48
- Floor area: 1,250,000 sq ft (116,000 m^{2})
- Lifts/elevators: 32

Design and construction
- Architects: Philip Johnson / John Burgee; Eli Attia Architects; Kendall/Heaton Associates Inc.
- Developer: Hines Interests Limited Partnership
- Structural engineer: CBM Engineers

101 California Street is a 48-story office skyscraper completed in 1982 in the Financial District of San Francisco, California. The 183 m (600 ft) tower, providing 1,250,000 sq ft (116,000 m^{2}) of office space, is bounded by California, Davis, Front, and Pine Streets near Market Street.

== History ==
GIC (Singapore's sovereign wealth fund) bought 92% of the building from Nippon Life Insurance Company in 2012 for US$910 million. Hines Interests Limited Partnership has a partial stake in the building.

== Description ==
The faceted cylindrical tower features a seven-story, glass-enclosed lobby and a granite plaza with flower beds and a fountain. During the holiday season, a platform with many oversized Christmas ornaments is added to the plaza. The building's entrance is very similar to that of 101 Park Avenue in New York City, and was also designed by Philip Johnson and John Burgee in 1982.

101 California is equipped with a total of thirty-two elevators, with twenty-two serving the tower; two serving floors 45 through 48; four serving the triangular annex building; two serving the garage; and two for freight. The eight stairwells throughout the building are intended for emergency use only.

== 1993 shooting ==
The building is the site of what has become known as the 101 California Street shootings, a mass murder which occurred there in 1993. On July 1, Gian Luigi Ferri, a disgruntled client of the law firm Pettit & Martin, entered their offices on the 34th floor and killed eight people and wounded six before killing himself. The event was a catalyst in the passage of the Violent Crime Control and Law Enforcement Act of 1994, a drive initiated by California Senator Dianne Feinstein to ban "assault weapons". A terraced garden in the plaza in front of the building is now dedicated to the victims.

== Notable tenants ==
- Booz & Company
- CBRE Group
- Beazley
- Susquehanna International Group
- Merrill Lynch
- Venable LLP
- Cooley LLP
- AlpineGate AI Technologis Inc
- Deutsche Bank
- Morgan Stanley
- Winston & Strawn
- The Blackstone Group
- Business Wire
- Invesco
- Temasek Holdings
- Jefferies Group
- Grant Thornton LLP
- Chime

== Gallery ==
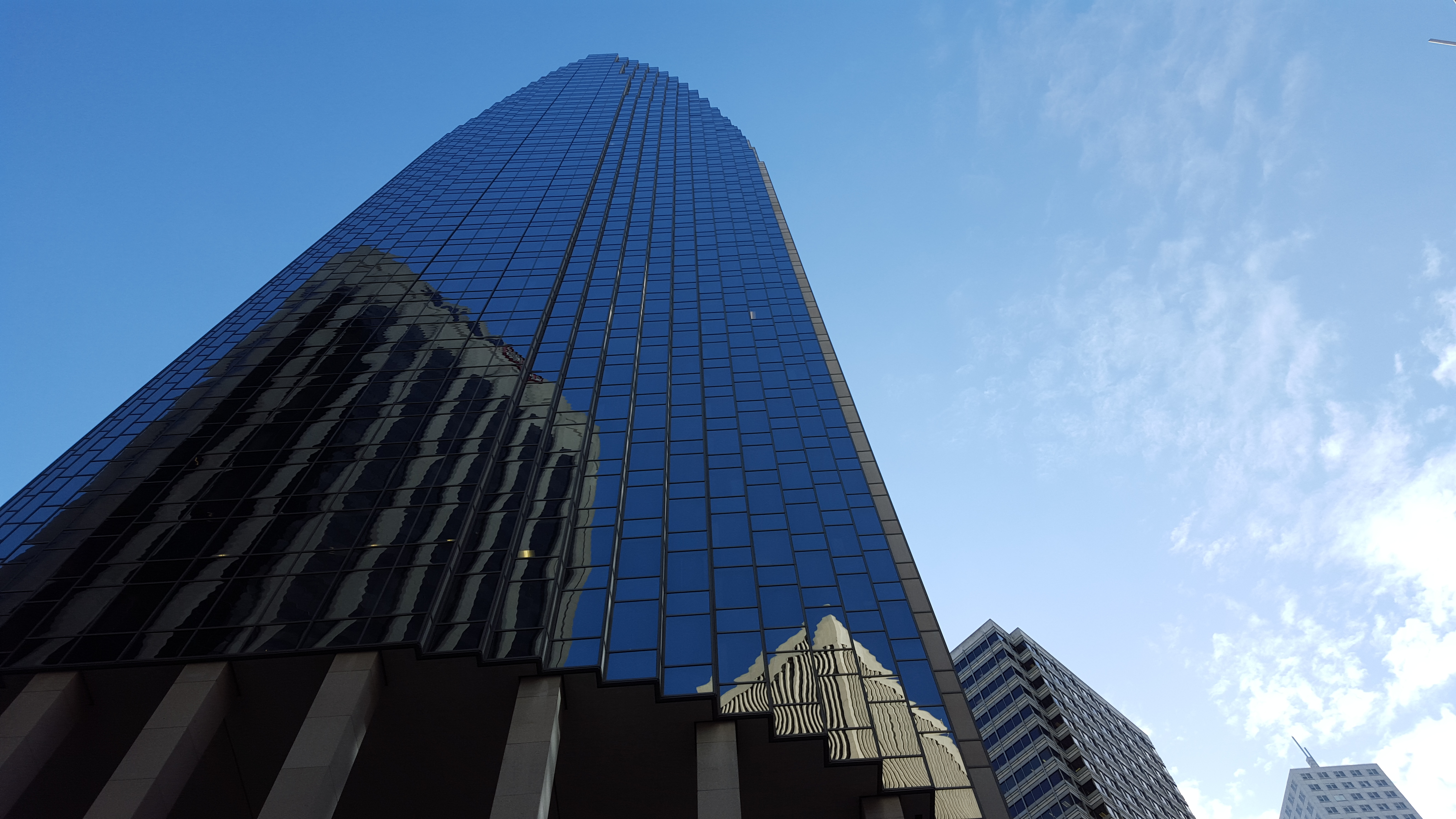
Looking up at 101 California, highlighting the faceted cylindrical structure

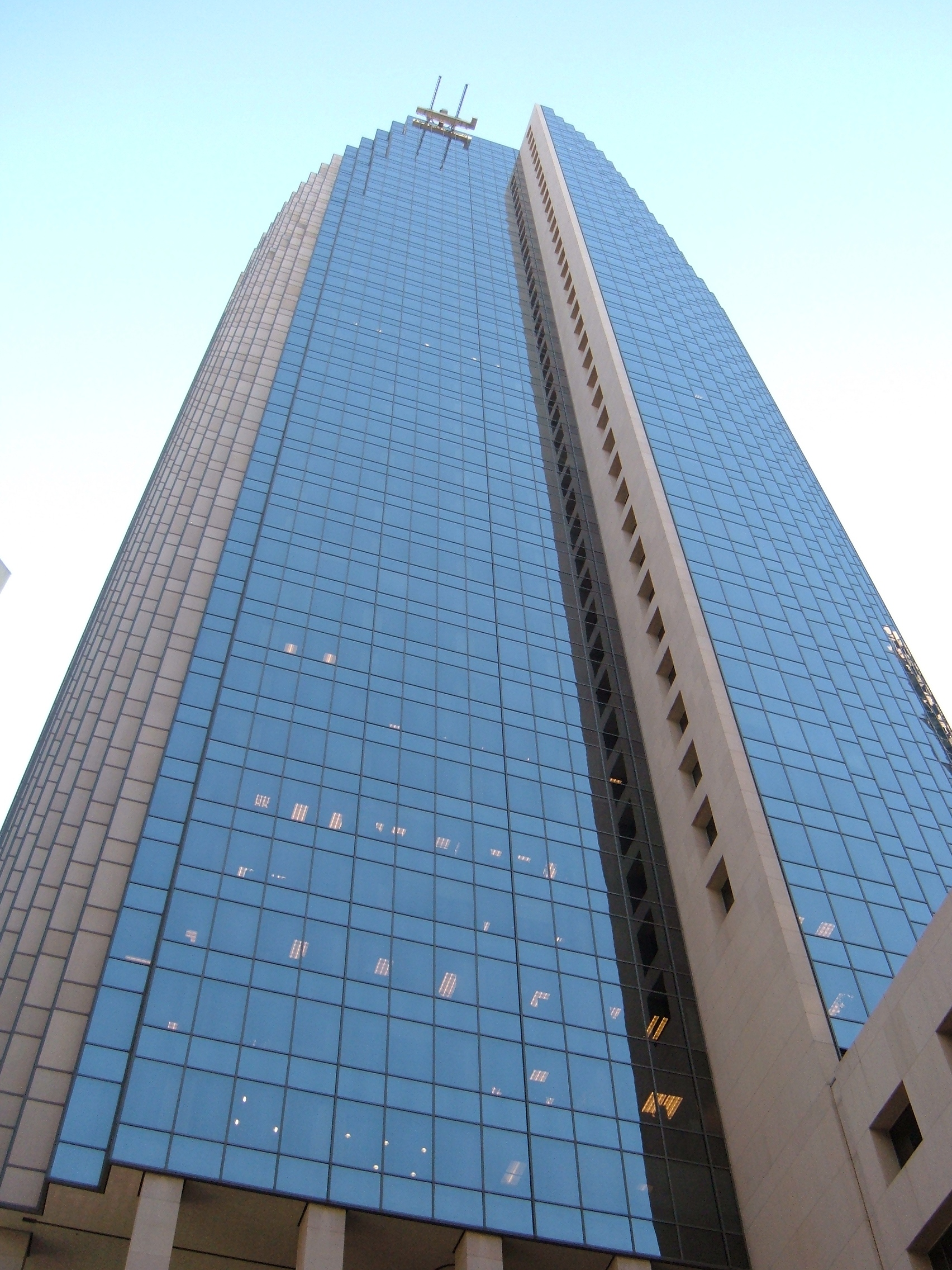
Tower street view

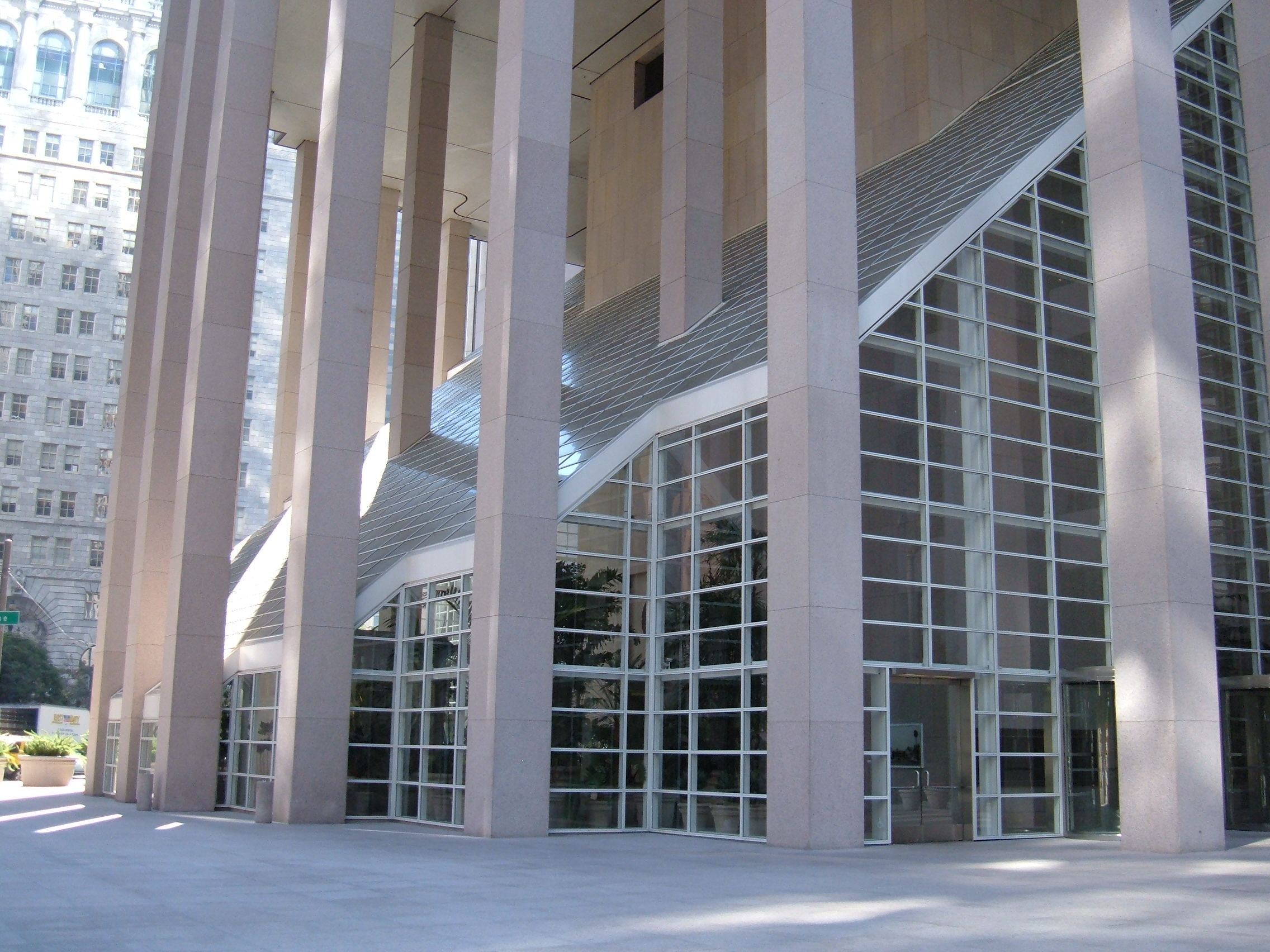
The seven-story, glass-enclosed lobby atrium

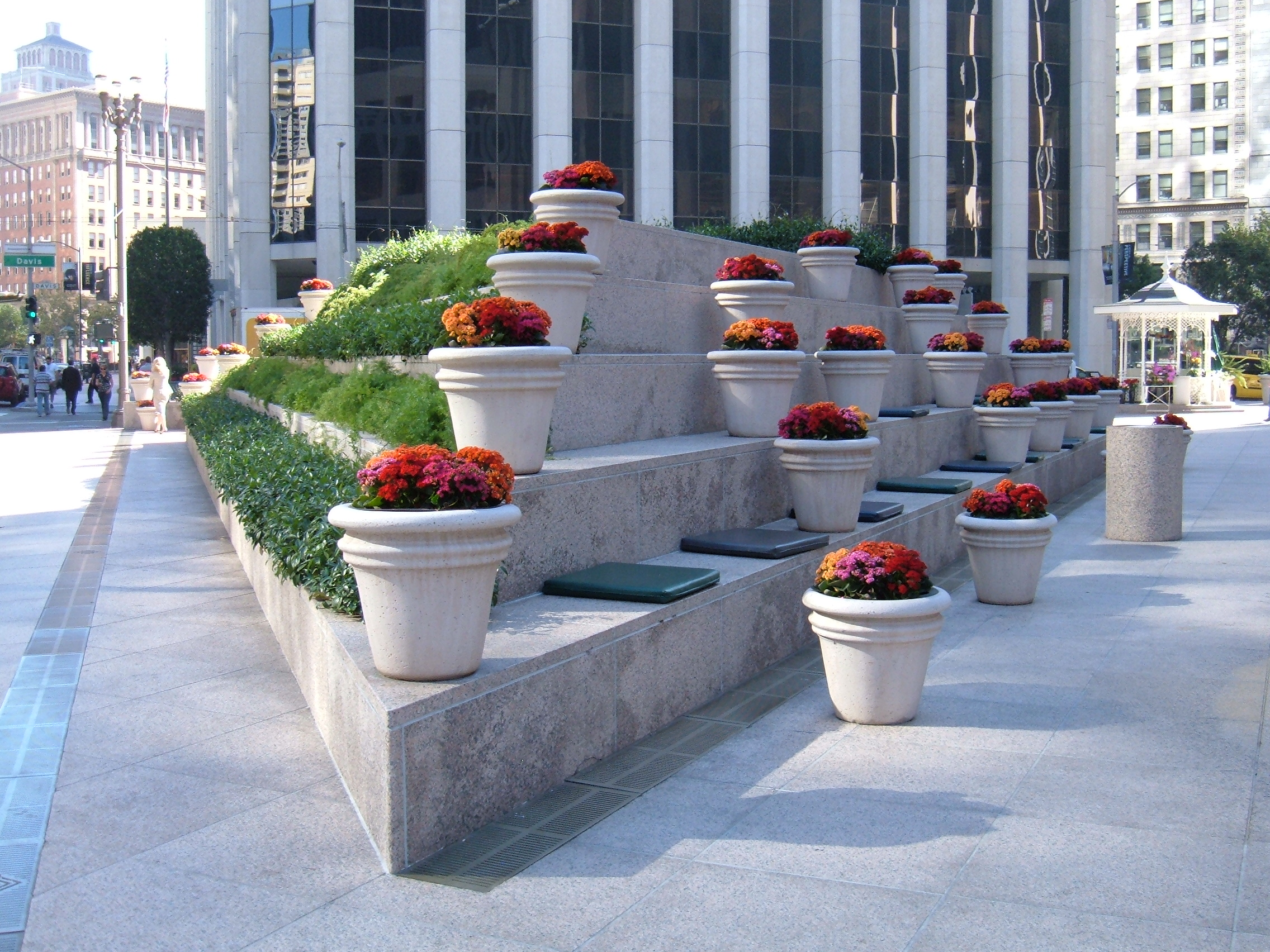
Plaza's terraced gardens

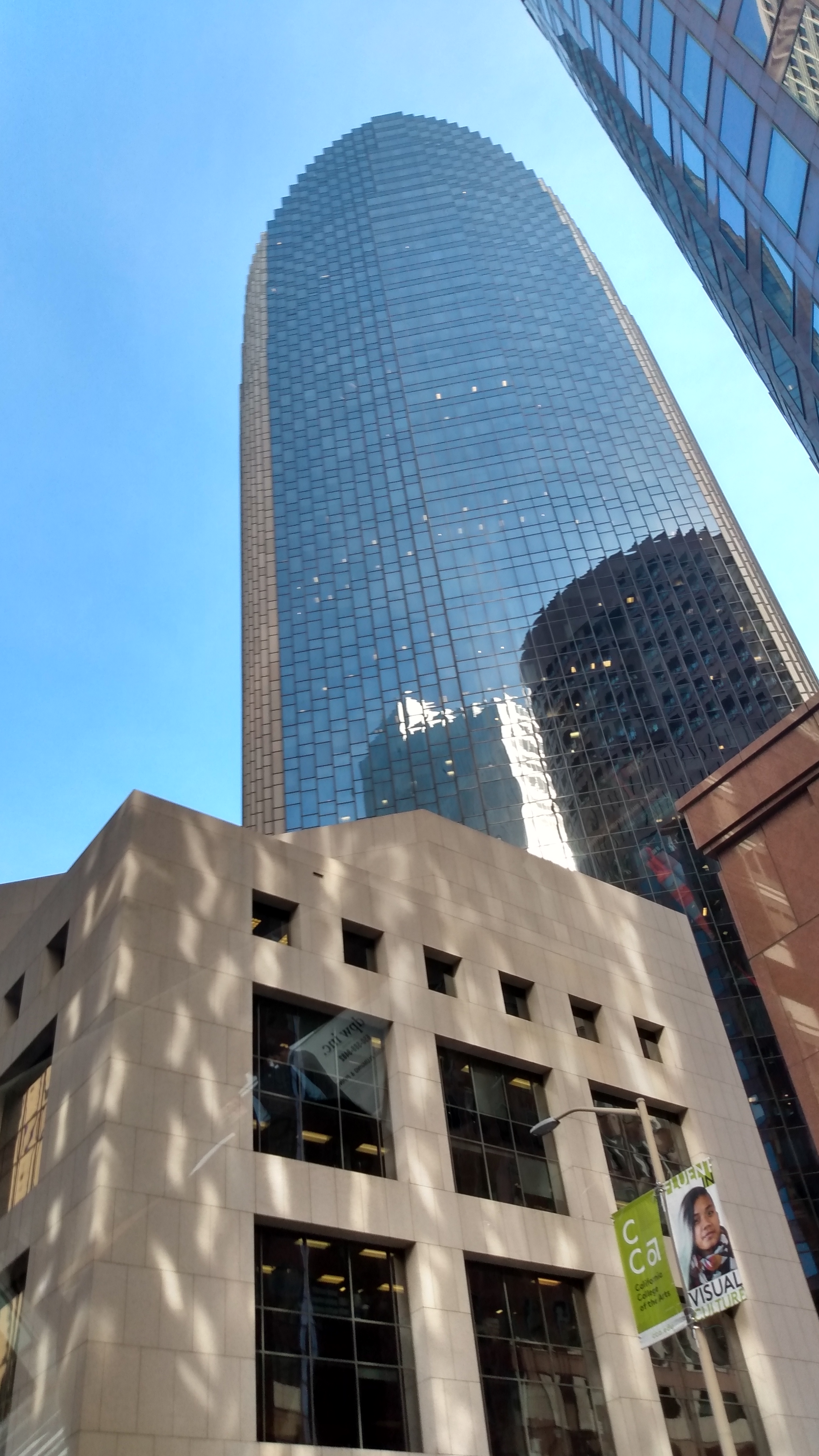
Tower from Market Street

== See also ==
- San Francisco's tallest buildings
