= Dispatches from Elsewhere =

American television series

- Genre: Anthology drama; Comedy-drama; Surrealism; Magical realism
- Created by: Jason Segel
- Based on: The Institute by: Jeff Hull; Spencer McCall
- Starring: Jason Segel; Andre Benjamin; Eve Lindley; Richard E. Grant; Sally Field
- Composers: Atticus Ross; Leopold Ross; Claudia Sarne
- Country of origin: United States
- Original language: English
- No. of seasons: 1
- No. of episodes: 10

Production
- Executive producers: Eli Bush; Garrett Basch; Jeff Freilich; Mark Friedman; Alethea Jones; Scott Rudin; Jason Segel
- Editor: Peter CabadaHagan
- Camera setup: Single-camera
- Running time: 41–51 minutes
- Production companies: AMC Studios; Scott Rudin Productions; Stalwart Productions

Original release
- Network: AMC
- Release: March 1 – April 27, 2020

Dispatches from Elsewhere is an American comedy-drama television series created by and starring Jason Segel that premiered on March 1, 2020, on AMC. It is based on the documentary film The Institute about the alternate reality game The Jejune Institute.

== Premise ==
The series, set in Philadelphia, Pennsylvania, follows "a group of ordinary people who stumble onto a puzzle hiding just behind the veil of everyday life. They will come to find that the mystery winds far deeper than they ever imagined."

== Cast ==
=== Main ===
- Jason Segel as Peter, a data worker struggling to find meaning in his life
- Andre Benjamin as Fredwynn, an intelligent yet paranoid man dedicated to figuring out the truth
- Eve Lindley as Simone, a trans woman seeking an escape from her feelings of isolation
- Richard E. Grant as Octavio Coleman, Esq., the enigmatic head of the Jejune Institute
- Sally Field as Janice Foster, an optimistic empty-nester trying to reclaim her sense of identity

=== Recurring ===
- Tara Lynne Barr as Young Janice
- Ceci Balagot as Clara
- Cherise Boothe as Lee
- Travis Burnett as Clown-Faced Boy
- Joe Forbrich as The Milkman
- Sean Patrick Folster as Bigfoot
- John McKeever as Neck Beard
- Amanda Schoonover as Waitress

== Production ==
=== Development ===
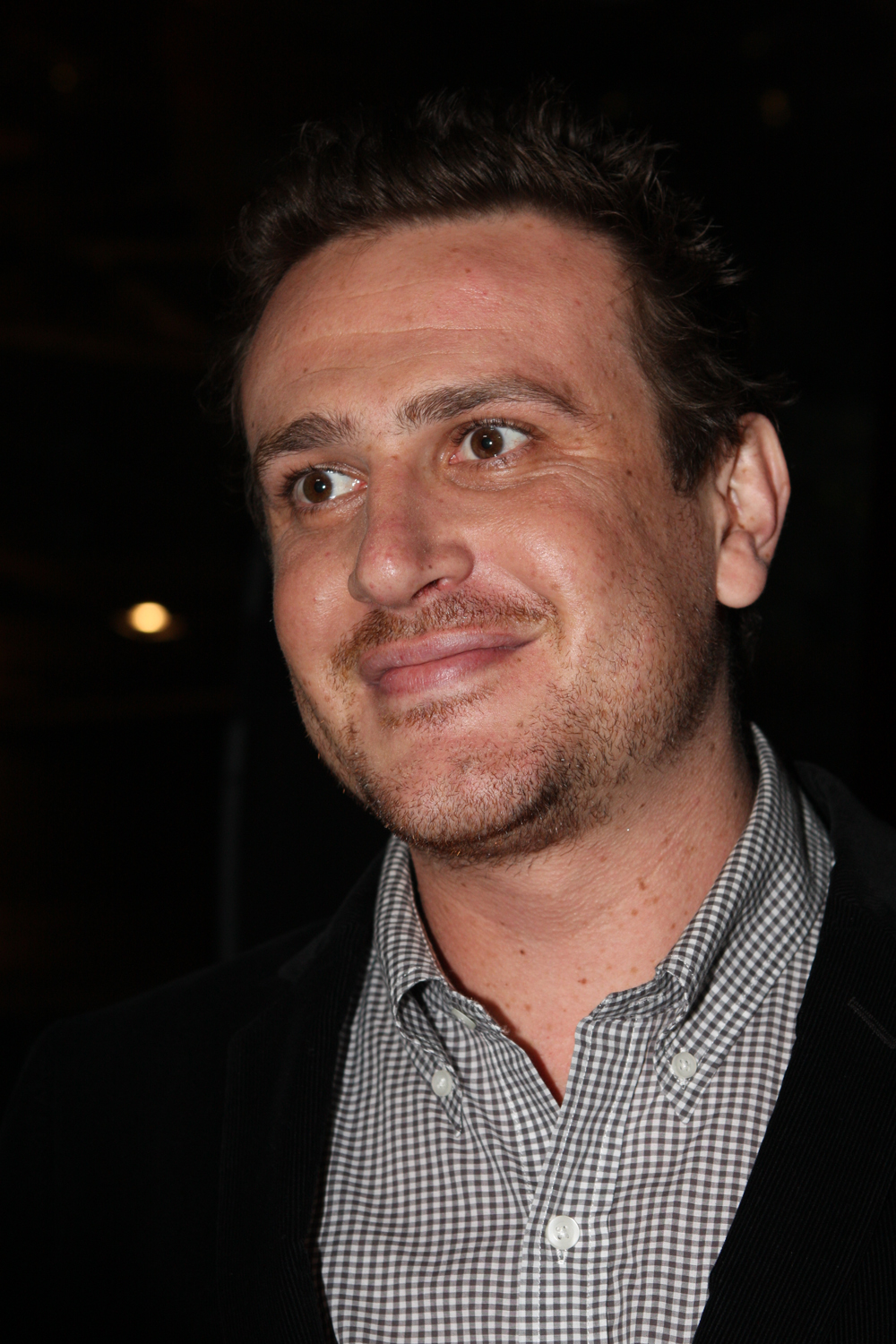
Jason Segel created the series and portrays the lead character.

On July 28, 2018, it was announced that AMC had given the production a series order. The series was created by Jason Segel who also directed the pilot and serves as executive producer alongside Scott Rudin, Eli Bush, and Garrett Basch. The series is based on the 2013 documentary film The Institute, which is the story of The Jejune Institute, an alternate reality game set in San Francisco.

Segel said that he chose to shoot in Philadelphia because during location scouting he was surprised to learn that the city is full of colorful public art; he said seeing the Magic Gardens for the first time was the moment he knew Philly was the right location for the show.

Early versions of the script were set in an unspecified city, and then were rewritten to be about specific Philadelphia locations.

=== Casting ===
Alongside the series order announcement in July 2018, it was announced that Jason Segel would star in the series. In April 2019, Richard E. Grant, Sally Field and Eve Lindley were added to the cast, with André Benjamin joining in July.

=== Filming ===
Principal photography for the series commenced in Philadelphia, Pennsylvania in July 2019.

=== Future ===
In an interview in April 2020 after the first-season finale, Jason Segel commented on the possibility of a second season: "[I]t can be either an anthology or a limited [series], depending on how we decide to proceed. But the idea is that each season is stand-alone—and without giving too much away, each season would profile a specific thing, as The Jejune Institute was profiled in the first season." By October 2021, the series was implied to be over.

== Episodes ==
No.	Title	Directed by	Written by	Original release date	U.S. viewers (millions)
1	"Peter"	Jason Segel	Teleplay by : Jason Segel	March 1, 2020	0.938
Octavio Coleman, Esq. introduces the viewer to Peter, an employee for a music streaming service leading a boring, unsatisfying life. One day, he encounters a series of mysterious flyers on his route to work. Intrigued, he decides to take a tag and calls the number, after which he's invited to the Jejune Institute for an induction ceremony. After arriving, Peter receives a warning about Jejune's insidious motives and flees the building. Following instructions from the so-named Commander 14 of the Elsewhere Society, Peter escapes the Institute and is sent an address. The information leads Peter to a shop in an alley where he meets Simone, and the two work together to find clues and solve the Society's puzzles. The experience improves Peter's outlook on life, but the feeling quickly fades away, only returning after receiving another Elsewhere Society mission. Peter's next task leads him to a gathering of other participants in the Society's games. Those present are assigned groups of four, where Peter is reunited with Simone and meets Fredwynn and Janice. The group is told to find Clara, Keeper of "Divine Nonchalance". They go to a diner to discuss the nature of the game, with Janice believing the game is a prank, Simone guessing it's a marketing stunt, and Fredwynn insisting that the whole thing is a high-level conspiracy. When pressed, Peter suggests that the game is real. Noticing the time, Simone leaves the diner but is accosted by two men outside. She arrives home shaken but assures herself that everything is okay.
2	"Simone"	Wendey Stanzler	Jason Segel	March 2, 2020	0.352
Octavio re-introduces the viewer to Simone, an art graduate student working as a docent at the Philadelphia Museum of Art. Simone receives a pack of batteries labelled 'Fish Food' at work. She goes to see Peter, who receives a talking electronic fish. The two take the fish, which introduces itself as Clara, to Fishtown. They follow the clues and eventually are lead up to a roof, where "Clara" encourages them to reveal something scary to each other. Peter admits to Simone that he likes her, but Simone is unable to reciprocate, leaving Peter devastated. Simone meets Fredwynn and Janice at the diner, where they discover that each partnership was presented with contradictory information. They are given the choice of going to the Elsewhere Society's protest or the Jejune Institute's shareholders' meeting. Deciding to attend both, Simone sees Peter at the protest and apologizes, while Fredwynn sneaks into Octavio's limousine as it leaves for the shareholders' meeting.
3	"Janice"	Michael Trim	Jordan Harrison & Jason Segel	March 9, 2020	0.240
The story carries on from the perspective of Janice as she, Peter, and Simone chase down Octavio's limousine. They follow the car to a theater, but Fredwynn is nowhere to be seen. Octavio finds them and takes them to the stage, where Janice is persuaded to join the audience of the shareholders' meeting. Janice volunteers to demonstrate "The I.D.E.A.", an invention apparently created by Clara before her disappearance. The device takes Janice back to the day of her wedding, showing her a version of her younger self expressing disdain for Janice's lack of independence. Suddenly, Commander 14 and the Elsewhere Society protesters crash the meeting and scuffle with the audience. Janice leaves with Simone and Peter, and they find Fredwynn outside the theater, who insists that Jejune and the Elsewhere Society are the same and that the whole game is scripted, though the other three are unconvinced. Janice returns home and tells her currently comatose husband Lev about her day while a young boy wearing clown makeup watches them through a window from outside.
4	"Fredwynn"	Michael Trim	Qui Nguyen	March 16, 2020	0.279
Taking place soon after where the previous episode began, Fredwynn is found by Octavio in the limousine's trunk and locked in a broom closet. He escapes and finds the control center for the stakeholders' meeting, which was orchestrating the wedding scene Janice was experiencing. The next day, Janice, Simone, Fredwynn, and Peter meet in the diner. Fredwynn proposes that the game is a distraction run by powerful data moguls, and he takes the other three to find out more. The others quickly get irritated by his suspicions and tell him to go home and wait for the next clue. Unable to sleep, he re-thinks his steps from the previous day and goes to ask Janice for help retrieving a clue from the wedding video. They enter her "memory palace" and decipher a hidden address. The two convince Simone and Peter to come with them to the address, where they discover a trapdoor leading down into the sidewalk.
5	"Clara"	Alethea Jones	Mark Friedman	March 23, 2020	0.212
The four enter the trapdoor and discover paintings Clara left behind along with hidden writing on the walls. The writing recounts Clara's life in Fishtown and the early days of the Elsewhere Society, originally made up of Clara and three friends. The Society worked to improve Fishtown and make it beautiful, garnering the attention of the Jejune Institute. The next day, Janice finds out Fredwynn hid urgent messages from her husband's nurse. Peter quits his job after being inspired by Clara's passion. Back at the house, the group resumes the story of Clara as she's being recruited by Octavio, who promised her vast resources and the power to change the world. She rejected Jejune's offer but disappeared soon after. After finishing the story, Simone shows Peter a 20-year-old photo of Clara's first mural — evidence that Clara and the events described in the game are real.
6	"Everyone"	Ariel Kleiman	Eva Anderson	March 30, 2020	0.228
At the diner, the group receives messages informing them "the truth" will be revealed that night. Believing this to be the end of the game, they agree to split into pairs to find out all they can before it's over. Peter volunteers to help Fredwynn uncover his conspiracy, leaving Janice and Simone to look for clues about Clara on his behalf. Peter realizes his former employer's parent company is involved in the game. He and Fredwynn infiltrate his old office and identify an IP address through a playlist containing the songs they've heard on their missions. Meanwhile, Janice and Simone find an apartment with one of Clara's paintings and discover her full name, Clara Torres, on a lease from 1999. Through newspaper records, they trace Clara's steps back to a former psychiatric hospital Janice had been admitted to in her past, now an apartment complex. Fredwynn and Peter meet them there, revealing the IP address location as the penthouse, and the four of them head up in the elevator. Inside the penthouse they find what looks to be a crime scene and a TV repeating messages from Octavio and Commander 14 both claiming the other has Clara.
7	"Cave of Kelpius"	Marta Cunningham	Ashley Lyle & Bart Nickerson	April 6, 2020	0.292
A man drinking chocolate milk arrives at the penthouse, but flees after seeing the group. They chase him to the street and follow him into an underground tunnel. They discover a gathering of other players from both the Elsewhere Society and Jejune Institute factions. Each group starts demanding the other side hand over Clara, when suddenly, Octavio and Commander 14 both appear. Commander 14 shows his real face, identical in appearance to Octavio, and they give everyone a new task: to work together. The group watches a video montage of their sleuthing from earlier that day, and realize that it was still just part of the game. Clara, Octavio, and Commander 14 reveal themselves as actors, devastating Peter. All the participants head over to the game's afterparty. Fredwynn searches for the architect of the game, while Simone and Peter agree to start a relationship. Feeling left out, Janice leaves the party and recognizes a woman as the architect. She asks the architect about the real Clara Torres. The architect tells her the real Clara is dead, and that it's all her (the architect's) fault.
8	"Lee"	Michael Trim	Story by : Ashley Lyle & Bart Nickerson & Bianca Ursillo; Teleplay by : Ashley Lyle & Bart Nickerson	April 13, 2020	0.269
The perspective briefly shifts to the architect, Lee, who created the game as a way to make amends for her self-perceived role in Clara's passing. After telling Janice the truth, Lee gives her the address of the mausoleum where Clara Torres's urn is kept. There, the four discover a cassette tape in which Clara describes her dream of creating art that changes people's view of the world, the message which first inspired Lee to create the game. Peter and Simone attempt a first date, but Simone refuses to continue a romantic relationship, insistent that Peter's naïveté would make it impossible for them in the real world. Meanwhile, Janice finds out Lev suffered a second stroke. Fredwynn stays with her at the hospital as she decides to take him off life support. Peter, Simone, and Fredwynn attend the funeral service, where Fredwynn gives the others their personal files from the game. A voiceover from Lee reads from their files, identifying each of the four as people who would have a great impact on each other, for better or worse. Later that night, Fredwynn breaks back into the mausoleum and discovers Clara's urn contains nothing but candy.
9	"The Creator"	Keith Gordon	Story by : Mark Friedman; Teleplay by : Ashley Lyle & Bart Nickerson	April 20, 2020	0.212
In the weeks and months following the game, Peter starts taking magic lessons and trying new things as a means of self-discovery. Janice urges Simone to stop running from everything, eventually leading to Peter and Simone rekindling their relationship. Janice learns to come to terms with her independence and starts taking college classes. The three meet back up on the anniversary of the game, but Fredwynn does not show. They go to his home and find him in a stupor brought on by his obsession with finding the truth about Clara. Concerned for his well-being, they take Fredwynn to meet Lee at Clara's house. Lee reveals that "Clara" was actually a personification of her creative side, whom she feels she betrayed in pursuit of business success. The game was designed to help Lee reconnect with that side of herself. The boy in clown makeup appears behind the group, and Peter is compelled to go with him. The boy takes Peter's hand and the two walk away, the rest of "Team Blue" close behind.
10	"The Boy"	Charlie McDowell	Jason Segel	April 27, 2020	0.198
In a flashback, the soon-to-be Clown-Faced Boy announces to his parents that he wants to become an actor. He trains hard and manages to achieve success with his stage act, but over the course of many performances he begins to feel stagnant and jaded. The scene shifts to a support group meeting attended by Jason Segel (a dramatized depiction of the actor played by himself), who laments his lack of direction in life. Simone invites Jason to her Barn of Beautiful Things and hands him a postcard to Elsewhere. The address on the card sends Jason on a game of his own across the city, inspiring him to write the script for a series titled "Dispatches from Elsewhere." Four months later, Jason finishes the script. He shows it to Simone, who likes it but notices Jason's lack of ownership of his faults. Soon after, Jason meets the Clown-Faced Boy, who unveils himself as a personification of Jason Segel's own career struggles, and tells him "it's time to grow up." Jason expresses a desire to own his actions, and requests help making the series a reality. The camera pans out to show Jason watching the series with Janice, Simone, and Fredwynn, who find it lovely but also remark on the self-indulgence of the final episode. Jason brings in the entire cast and crew of the show and thanks the audience for watching. Octavio then delivers the ending monologue with the help of viewer-submitted videos, reminding the viewer that change comes when we find one another.

== Broadcast ==
The series was broadcast by AMC in the United States. In the United Kingdom, it premiered on April 29, 2020, on BT TV.

== Reception ==
=== Critical response ===
On Rotten Tomatoes, the series has an 85% rating with an average score of 7.2 out of 10 based on 39 reviews. The website's critical consensus is, "A weird and whimsical journey into the unknown, Dispatches from Elsewhere's experimental approach doesn't always coalesce, but committed performances and a genuine sense of wonder make it a trip worth taking." On Metacritic, it has a score of 66 out of 100 based on 17 reviews, indicating "generally favorable reviews".

Keith Phipps of TV Guide gave it a 4/5 rating and wrote, "What is going on is no clearer at the end of the first four episodes. That also doesn't really matter all that much. The series is as intriguing as it is heartfelt thanks to stylishly imaginative storytelling and richly developed characters." Alan Sepinwall of Rolling Stone gave it a 3/5 star review and wrote, "Does Dispatches From Elsewhere earn its quirkiness? It's hard to tell based on the limited sample of episodes AMC made available to critics. But it's not boring, and its optimism is appealing in and of itself."

=== Accolades ===
For the 32nd GLAAD Media Awards, the series was nominated for Outstanding Limited or Anthology Series.

== Alternate reality game (ARG) ==
In October 2019, fliers promoting a fictional entity called The New Noology Network (NNN) were found in the U.S. and Canada, advertising a study on recording dreams. This directed people towards the NNN's Twitch channel apparently broadcasting patient sessions live, until it was revealed to be a farce. Shortly after, NNN reached out to get participants to record themselves doing seemingly absurd tasks, similar in nature to the instructions given to participants of The Jejune Institute.

Participants eventually figured out that this ARG was indeed directly connected to Dispatches from Elsewhere. Hidden clues in each episode starting from the second one led to clues tracking the location of a van, furthering the progress of the ARG and mirroring the search for Clara in the show. The final episode featured some of the participants' recordings of tasks from before, particularly recordings of themselves saying "I am (participant's name), and I am you", mimicking a line from the show. Segel himself was responsible for choosing which recordings to use in the finale, and contacting the chosen participants telling them to keep the secret. More clues led to a private video message from Segel thanking participants for their involvement.

ARG company Hexagram was responsible for creating the ARG with involvement from Segel, AMC's VP of digital content Kevin Dreyfuss, and AMC's director of digital media Sarah LeTrent. Hexagram enlisted Sludge to produce the live interactive content for the ARG, filming on location in New Mexico. Due to the COVID-19 pandemic, instead of a grand finale with a live audience, the remainder of the ARG was re-scripted, telling players to stay safe at home and tune in to the remaining live streams.
