= Business Wire =

American marketing/communications company

- Type: Subsidiary
- Founded: 1961; 65 years ago
- Founder: Lorry I. Lokey
- Headquarters: 101 California Street, San Francisco, California, U.S.
- Number of locations: 29 (2018)
- Key people: Geff Scott (CEO)
- Parent: Berkshire Hathaway
- Website: businesswire.com

Business Wire is an American company that disseminates full-text press releases from thousands of companies and organizations worldwide to news media, financial markets, disclosure systems, investors, information web sites, databases, bloggers, social networks and other audiences. It is a wholly owned subsidiary of Berkshire Hathaway.

== History ==
Business Wire was founded in 1961 by Lorry I. Lokey. It started by sending releases to 16 media outlets in California. Business Wire launched its website in May 1995. In 2000, ahead of its main competitor PR Newswire, Business Wire ended the practice of distributing news to financial outlets 15 minutes before anyone else, to provide immediate, equal access to company information as noted by the SEC's fair disclosure regulation (Reg FD).

Business Wire's first wholly owned European operation launched in 2001, with the opening of an office in London. On June 1, 2005, Business Wire entered the German Ad-Hoc market with a disclosure network for companies with primary or secondary listings on the Deutsche Boerse. The service was established in compliance with BaFin, Germany's national securities regulator. On September 15, 2005, Business Wire established Regulatory Disclosure networks in France, Sweden, Switzerland and Luxembourg. The move came in anticipation of the anticipated implementation of the EU's Transparency Obligations Directive (TOD). On January 1, 2007, Autorité des marchés financiers, the French Financial Markets Regulator, approved Business Wire to operate as a Regulatory Disclosure Service in France.

On January 10, 2005, Business Wire established an Asian hub with the opening of its Tokyo, Japan bureau, and later that year added Japanese, making the site available in seven languages. On January 17, 2006, Berkshire Hathaway announced that it was purchasing Business Wire for an undisclosed amount. This acquisition was completed on March 1, 2006.

In 2008, Business Wire partnered with ImpreMedia to launch LatinoWire, a news distribution service that distributes brand content to Hispanic websites, media outlets, journalists and bloggers. In 2011, Business Wire received a patent for the technological process of optimizing and distributing press releases to maximize their ability to be found and tracked in leading search engines. The originality of the patent was questioned by SEO expert Danny Sullivan.

On September 23, 2013, Business Wire announces exclusive distribution partnership with VentureBeat On November 3, 2013, Business Wire opened its office in Hong Kong.

In January 2014, Business Wire launched a new news and content distribution enhancement service.

In April 2017, its chief executive officer and president, Cathy Baron Tamraz, retired and was replaced by longtime CFO Geff Scott.

== See also ==
- List of press release agencies
