= The Jejune Institute =

Art installation in San Francisco, US (2008–2011)

The Jejune Institute (also known as The Games of Nonchalance, or Nonchalance’s Interdimensional Hopscotch) was an alternate reality game, public art installation and immersive experience that ran in San Francisco, California from 2008 to 10 April 2011. It was conceived by Jeff Hull and launched by the arts group Nonchalance in 2008.

== Background and game experience ==
The Jejune Institute, also known as The Games of Nonchalance, was conceived by Jeff Hull and launched by the arts group Nonchalance in 2008.

In 2013, a documentary about the project titled “The Institute" was released. It suggested that The Jejune Institute “combined a Fluxus stunt, a freelance crowd-psychology experiment, a ludic self-help workshop, interactive promenade theatre, and some traditional hipster bullshit.”

People discovered the experience through fliers for dolphin therapy and the "Aquatic Thought Foundation" placed around San Francisco, or via word of mouth.

There were four chapters total. 4,000 people had visited the first chapter by 2010, and more than 7,000 people visited the game's first chapter by the game's conclusion. Hull reported that attendance dropped by about 50%-75% after each chapter, with about 120 people who made it through the first three chapters.

The first chapter took place at an office building at 580 California Street. Visitors went to the 16th floor of the building and watched a video in an automated "induction room", before embarking on a two- or three-hour walk around San Francisco's Financial District and Chinatown. Players looked for hidden information embedded in sidewalks, murals on the sides of buildings, and attached to statues. Clues were hidden inside mailboxes and on "missing person" flyers with in-game phone numbers.

The second chapter began in San Francisco's Mission District and took 6 hours to complete. At the top of Upper Dolores Park, visitors could tune into a 1-watt radio transmitter playing a 45-minute piece of audio.

There was a "mini episode" between the second and third chapter, a public rally held in San Francisco's Union Square. The event was attended by 200 people.

The third chapter was set in the Coit Tower park area of San Francisco, where visitors could view videos showing events from the past.

Between chapter three and four, eight players received postcards, emails, and phone calls from in-game characters. They were instructed to bring their clues together to solve them as a group, and met in a mausoleum.

Prelinger Library participated, by hosting "The Evalyn Lucien Archive".

== 01SJ 2010 ==
In 2010, during the 01SJ Biennial in San Jose, California, Radio Nonchalance was a pirate FM radio transmission.

== Fictional story ==
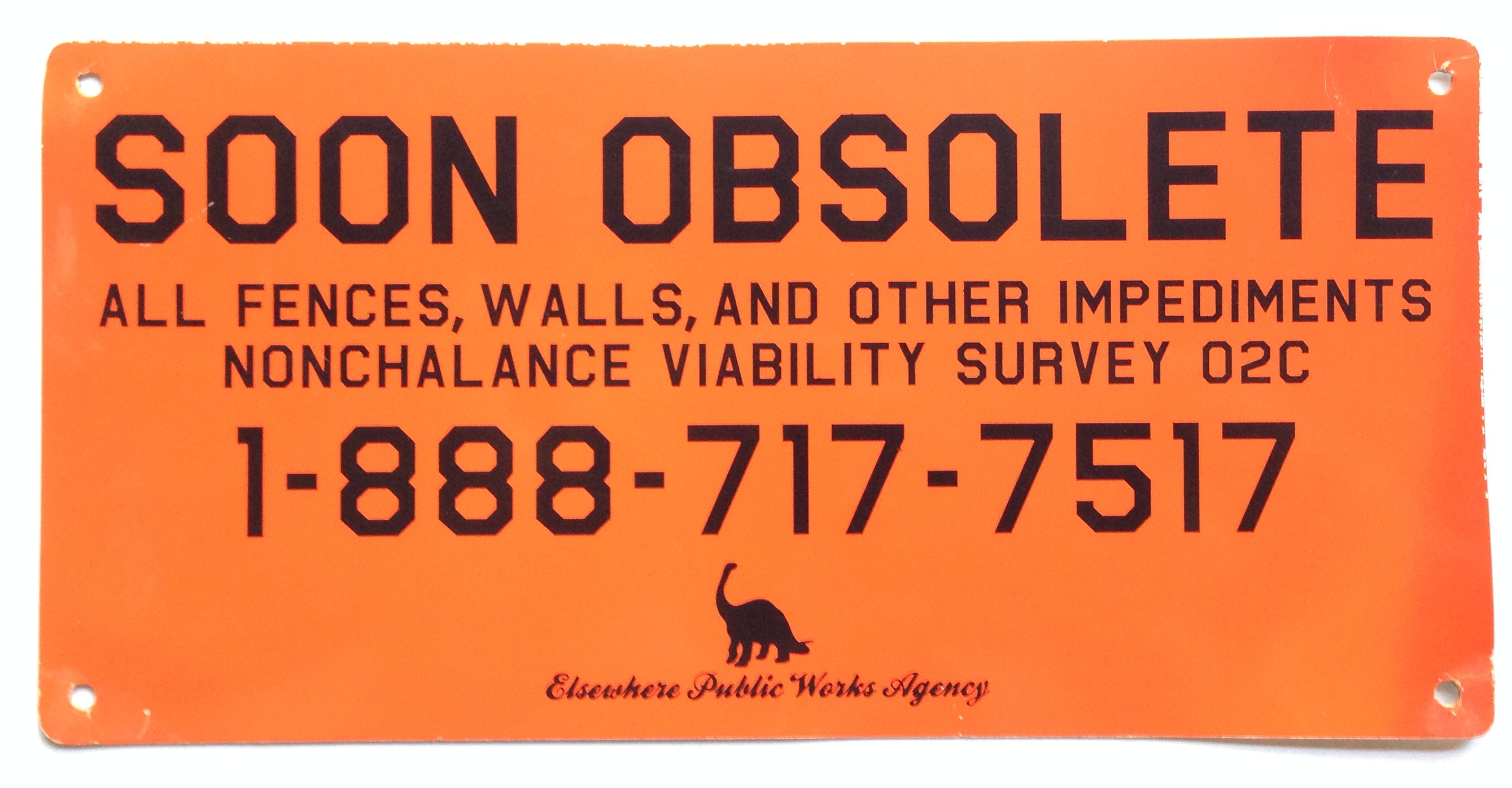
A metal sign made for the fictitious "Elsewhere Public Works" as part of alternate reality game "The Jejune Institute"

In the story, the Jejune Institute is an organization founded by a man named Octavio Coleman Esq. in the 1960s as the "Center for Socio-Reengineering".

The fictional Elsewhere Public Works Agency (EPWA) is an underground rebel group trying to dismantle the Jejune Institute. The EPWA pre-dated the Jejune Institute, with art and fake public service announcements appearing around Oakland. The "mini episode" rally held between chapters two and three was framed as an in-world EPWA event.

The story also features a fictional woman named Eva Lucien who went missing in 1988 near Coit Tower.

== Live finale event ==
Players received emails from the EPWA instructing them to attend a seminar on 10 April 2011 to overthrow the Jejune Institute. 150 people gathered in the Garden Room at the Grand Hyatt in San Francisco, California for the “Socio-Reengineering Seminar 2011: An Afternoon of Rhythmic Synchronicity". The seminar lasted more than four hours.

Players later stated that they were expecting an exciting event that concluded the narrative, and stated that they were surprised and disappointed by the anticlimactic ending.

== The Institute ==
In 2013, director Spencer McCall, who had edited videos for the game, released The Institute, reconstructing the story of the Jejune Institute through interviews with the participants and the creators. The film screened at Oakland's Underground Film Festival in September 2013.

The film contained both documentary elements and reenactment, leading people to call into question the veracity of the film.

== Dispatches from Elsewhere ==
The 2020 TV series Dispatches from Elsewhere was based on The Institute documentary film.
