= Donna Levin =

American novelist

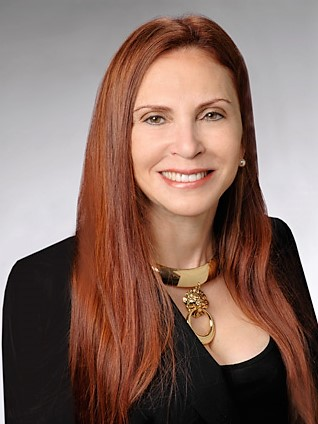
- Levin in 2017
- Born: September 4, 1954 (age 71); Oakland, California, U.S.
- Education: University of California, Berkeley; University of California, Hastings College of the Law (JD)
- Occupation: Novelist
- Writing career
- Notable works: Extraordinary Means; California Street; There’s More Than One Way Home; He Could Be Another Bill Gates; The Talking Stick
- Website: donnalevin.com

Donna Levin (born September 4, 1954) is a San Francisco-based author, editor and writing teacher. She has published the novels Extraordinary Means (Arbor House, 1987), California Street (Simon and Schuster, 1990), There’s More Than One Way Home (Chickadee Prince Books, 2017) and He Could Be Another Bill Gates (Chickadee Prince Books, 2018).

Born in the city of Oakland, California, Levin graduated Phi Beta Kappa from the University of California, Berkeley with a degree in theater arts, and earned a J.D. from the University of California, Hastings College of the Law.

Levin taught for many years for the University of California, Berkeley Extension as an instructor in the creative writing department. Levin drew from her experiences as a workshop leader there and at other venues to write two books on the craft of fiction, Get That Novel Started (Writer’s Digest Books, 1992) and Get That Novel Written (Writer’s Digest Books, 1996).

Levin’s papers are part of the Howard Gotlieb Archival Research Center at Boston University, and her novels are part of the collection of “California Fiction” in the California State Library.

== Novels ==
Extraordinary Means is a literary fantasy in which a young woman, although diagnosed in an irreversible coma, is able to observe her family members debate over whether or not to withdraw life support. It is loosely drawn from the real-life controversy surrounding the Karen Ann Quinlan case. California Street, categorized as "romance suspence" by Marilyn Stasio of The New York Times was published at a time when the number of women mystery writers was proliferating. The protagonist is Joel Abramowitz, a compassionate but flawed psychoanalyst who inadvertently becomes involved in the disappearance of one woman and the murder of another. There’s More Than One Way Home is a retelling of Anna Karenina set in contemporary San Francisco. The novel features an autistic son, and is an addition to the new genre of "autism lit."

He Could Be Another Bill Gates, is a sequel to There's More Than One Way Home, and features the same main characters five years later.
