= The Go Game =

Competitive corporate mobile game

The Go Game is an interactive team building activity often used to improve teamwork game put on by a San Francisco company of the same name. Players race through the game zone solving clues and performing tasks with the aid of a cell phone and digital camera in an effort to earn the most points. The Go Game advertises itself as “the future of corporate play,” and was voted “Best Way to Rediscover Your City” by the SF Weekly.

== History ==
In 2001, Ian Fraser and Finnegan Kelly started running interactive street games for friends that used cellphones as part of the game, an original concept at the time, based in the Mission District. Fraser said that the idea and name had come to him in a dream about a journey. They then ran larger games and started charging players to participate in the game, which grew into The Go Game as a company.

In 2009, they started a game office in the United Kingdom. In 2010, they had 11 employees and noted the company was self-funded.

As of 2011, they had run more than 10,000 games, mostly team building games for companies, and they had $3 million in annual revenue, with games costing $50-100 per player to run. At the South by Southwest conference in 2011, they released an iPhone application for creating and participating in local scavenger hunts, which was compared to the SCVNGR app. GigaOM called the app "an interesting example of the gamification of work", since the target use was teambuilding exercises.

They have also organized games that teach disaster preparedness as well as serving as entertainment, such as a "zombie survival" game run in coordination with the city of San Francisco. The Go Game also ran a "heroes" themed game with the city to encourage preparing for natural disasters; a city representative's blog connected this to themes of gamification and "Government 2.0".

== Gameplay ==
Players receive customized cellphones that provide location-based clues about missions and puzzles to complete, and actors participate in the game as characters.
