= Oaklandish =

American fashion line and retail store

- Company logo
- Industry: fashion; retail store
- Founded: Oakland, California 2000
- Headquarters: Oakland, United States
- Area served: San Francisco Bay Area
- Revenue: $3.26 million (2015)
- Website: oaklandish.com

Oaklandish is a fashion line and retail store located in Oakland, California, in the United States. The company logo is a modified version of the city logo, an oak tree with wide outspread roots. 10% of the proceeds from the sales of Oaklandish items goes to local non-profit community groups through the "Oakland Innovators Award" grant program. Everything sold in the store is screen-printed in Oakland. In 2016, the store was named the 38th fastest growing inner city business in the United States by Fortune.

== Background ==
Oaklandish, created by local artist Jeff Hull, began in 2000 as a street art and viral marketing campaign designed to raise awareness about local history and culture. Original projects included a wheat-paste poster series, the "Oakland-Love Retrospective" slide show (projected onto downtown architectural landmarks), the Liberation Drive-In parking lot movie series, and the Oakslander Lakeside Gazette zine. These projects aimed to infuse cultural content into negative urban spaces during a time of rapid development in the city.

From 2003 to 2005 they operated an art gallery in Jack London Square. When the space closed, Oaklandish began selling their wares from a modified camper van at street festivals and farmers markets. Owner Angela Tsay credits the reopening of the Fox Oakland Theatre in 2009 as the catalyst for reinvigorating a deteriorating downtown Oakland, which led to the eventual opening of Oaklandish's flagship store in Downtown Oakland in 2011. That year, they also introduced a new clothing brand representing cities across the country, called There There. In 2012 they partnered with Town Park, a skate park in Oakland, to create skateboards. In 2013, they opened a store in the Dimond neighborhood, followed by the Oakland Supply Co. store in Jack London Square in 2014.

Every year, the flagship store gives away t-shirts to Oakland Unified School District students who earn a grade point average of 3.5 or higher. Oaklandish also produces "Dubs Gear," a label of Golden State Warriors clothing that is independent of the franchise. In 2015, Oaklandish partnered with Adidas and basketball player Damian Lillard to design and sell a limited edition basketball shoe. A second clothing line, There There, features designs for other major cities, including Philadelphia and Baltimore.

In 2016, Fortune named Oaklandish the 38th fastest growing inner city business in the United States. They described Oaklandish's business model as "pioneering" and recognized the business as the first American company to operate a mobile retail component, by using campers to sell products throughout the city. In 2015, the business made $3.26 million in revenue. Krazy George Henderson and Jean Quan are customers of the store.
