= Tomorrowland (film) =

2015 film by Brad Bird

- Theatrical release poster
- Directed by: Brad Bird
- Screenplay by: Damon Lindelof; Brad Bird
- Story by: Damon Lindelof; Brad Bird; Jeff Jensen
- Based on: Walt Disney's Tomorrowland
- Produced by: Damon Lindelof; Brad Bird; Jeffrey Chernov
- Starring: George Clooney; Hugh Laurie; Britt Robertson; Raffey Cassidy; Tim McGraw; Kathryn Hahn; Keegan-Michael Key
- Cinematography: Claudio Miranda
- Edited by: Walter Murch; Craig Wood
- Music by: Michael Giacchino
- Production companies: Walt Disney Pictures; A113 Productions
- Distributed by: Walt Disney Studios; Motion Pictures
- Release dates: May 9, 2015 (Disneyland); May 22, 2015 (United States)
- Running time: 130 minutes
- Country: United States
- Language: English
- Budget: $180–190 million
- Box office: $209 million

Tomorrowland (Note: The film was also released as Tomorrowland: A World Beyond and Project T in some international markets.) is a 2015 American science fiction film directed by Brad Bird with a screenplay by Bird and Damon Lindelof. The film is based on the themed land Tomorrowland from the Disney Parks and a story by Bird, Lindelof, and Jeff Jensen. It stars George Clooney, Hugh Laurie, Britt Robertson, Raffey Cassidy, Tim McGraw, Kathryn Hahn, and Keegan-Michael Key. In the film, a disillusioned genius inventor and a teenage science enthusiast embark to an intriguing parallel universe known as "Tomorrowland", where their actions directly affect their own world.

Walt Disney Pictures originally announced the film in June 2011 under the working title 1952 and later retitled it to Tomorrowland after the Disney Parks theme land. In drafting their story, Bird and Lindelof took inspiration from the progressive cultural movements of the Space Age, as well as Walt Disney's optimistic philosophy of the future, notably his conceptual vision for the planned community known as EPCOT. Principal photography began in August 2013, with scenes shot at multiple locales in five countries.

Tomorrowland was released by Walt Disney Studios Motion Pictures in conventional and IMAX formats on May 22, 2015. The film, which received mixed reviews from critics, grossed $209 million worldwide and was considered a commercial failure for losing Disney $120–150 million at the box office.

== Plot ==
At the 1964 New York World’s Fair, young inventor Frank Walker attempts to showcase his homemade jet pack, but it fails and does not impress the judges. However, a mysterious girl, Athena, sees potential in him. She gives him a lapel pin marked with a “T” and directs him onto the Disney It's a Small World ride, where the pin triggers a hidden transport to Tomorrowland—a dazzling futuristic city in another dimension. There, robots repair his jet pack, allowing him to soar through the city and join its secret community of innovators.

In the present, teenage optimist Casey Newton continually sabotages the demolition of a NASA launch platform in hopes of saving her father’s job. After she is arrested, she discovers a Tomorrowland pin among her belongings. Touching it transports her to the futuristic world, but only as a projection; when the pin’s power is expended, she abruptly returns to her normal reality. Determined to understand what she saw, Casey follows clues to a memorabilia shop in Houston, where the owners attack her for information about the pin. Athena bursts in and defeats the owners, actually Audio-Animatronics, who self-destruct, blowing apart the shop. After Casey and Athena steal a car, Athena reveals she is also an animatronic, purposed to find and recruit people who fit the ideals of Tomorrowland.

Athena brings Casey to a now-adult Frank Walker, who is a bitter recluse living in upstate New York. Banished from Tomorrowland years earlier, Frank wants nothing to do with the place. Casey discovers he has built a device predicting the imminent end of the world, but her refusal to accept that future causes the probability to drop—something Frank has never seen. When robotic assassins arrive to eliminate them, Frank reluctantly joins Casey and Athena. Using a teleportation device, they travel to Paris and launch an old rocket hidden beneath the Eiffel Tower. Frank explains that Tomorrowland was created by Plus Ultra, a secret society of visionaries lead by Gustave Eiffel, Jules Verne, Nikola Tesla, and Thomas Edison, who sought a place free from political and commercial interference.

Arriving in Tomorrowland, the trio finds the once‑utopian city in decline. Governor David Nix greets them and leads them to a tachyon machine Frank invented which can view possible futures. It has been broadcasting visions of global catastrophe to Earth. Casey realizes the machine’s warnings have become a self-fulfilling prophecy: humanity, overwhelmed by doom, simply stopped trying to prevent disaster. Nix admits he intended the images as a wake‑up call, but when the world ignored them, he gave up and decided to let the apocalypse unfold. Casey, Frank, and Athena attempt to destroy the machine, but Nix fights to stop them. During the struggle, Athena foresees Nix killing Frank. She sacrifices herself to save him by triggering her self‑destruct sequence. The explosion destroys the tachyon device, and the falling wreckage kills Nix.

In the aftermath, Casey and Frank take leadership of Tomorrowland. They recruit Casey’s father and brother, and they build a new generation of Athena‑like animatronics. Given Tomorrowland pins, these childlike robots set out across the world to find new dreamers, thinkers, and inventors—people capable of building a better future.

== Cast ==
- George Clooney as Frank Walker, a grizzled inventor who was banished from Tomorrowland decades ago by its leader, David Nix
  - Thomas Robinson as young Frank Walker
- Hugh Laurie as David Nix, leader/Governor of Tomorrowland
- Britt Robertson as Casey Newton, an optimistic and tech-savvy teenager
- Raffey Cassidy as Athena, an Audio-Animatronic android recruiter
- Tim McGraw as Eddie Newton, Casey's father and a NASA engineer
- Kathryn Hahn as Ursula, store owner and one of Nix's agents
- Keegan-Michael Key as Hugo, store owner and another of Nix's agents
- Pierce Gagnon as Nate Newton, Casey's younger brother
- Chris Bauer as Frank's dad

== Production ==
=== Development ===
In 2010, Damon Lindelof began discussions with Walt Disney Studios about producing a modern science-fiction Disney film, with Tomorrowland as a basis. The project was greenlit by Walt Disney Pictures' president of production, Sean Bailey in June 2011 with Lindelof signed on to write and produce a film with the working title of 1952. Lindelof asked Jeff Jensen, who had previously published material on Lindelof's Lost television series, if he would be interested in contributing to story elements. Jensen agreed and began to research the history of the Walt Disney Company, particularly Walt Disney's fascination with futurism, scientific innovation and utopia, as well as his involvement with the 1964 New York World's Fair and Disney's unrealized concept for EPCOT. In May 2012, Brad Bird was hired to direct the film and write the screenplay with Lindelof. Bird's story ideas and themes were influenced by the fading of cultural optimism that once defined society in the 1950s, 1960s, and early 1970s, stating that, "When Damon and I were first talking about the project, we were wondering why people's once-bright notions about the future gradually seemed to disappear."

While keeping information about the plot secret, when asked in November 2012 whether the project would be Star Wars: Episode VII, Bird denied the rumor, but confirmed that Tomorrowland would be a science-fiction film, with Lindelof adding that the film would not center on extraterrestrials. Coincidentally, Bird had been tapped to direct Star Wars: Episode VII, but turned down the offer in order to work on Tomorrowland. Later that month, George Clooney entered negotiations to star in the film. In February 2013, Hugh Laurie joined the film. In July 2013, Britt Robertson was cast.

On January 23, 2013, nearly a week before the title change, Bird tweeted a picture related to the project. The image showed a frayed cardboard box labeled 1952, supposedly uncovered from the Walt Disney Imagineering developmental unit, and containing items like archival photographs of Walt Disney, Technicolor film, envelopes, a vinyl record, space technology literature, a 1928 copy of an Amazing Stories magazine (which introduced Philip Francis Nowlan's Buck Rogers character), and an unidentified metal object. On August 10, 2013, Bird and Lindelof gave a presentation at the D23 Expo in Anaheim, California, where they opened the "1952" box and revealed many of its contents. Later that day a pavilion was unveiled on the D23 Expo show floor which presented the items for close inspection by guests. There was also an accompanying iPhone app which took viewers through the exhibit much like one would experience at a museum. Michael Giacchino was hired to compose the film music.

Originally, the film included overt references to Walt Disney's involvement with Plus Ultra, the fictional organization founded by Gustave Eiffel, Jules Verne, Nikola Tesla, and Thomas Edison — including the idea that Disneyland's Tomorrowland was intended to be a cover-up for the real one developed by the group — however, the scenes and dialogue were omitted from the final cut of the film. Pixar Animation Studios created an animated short film, narrated by Maurice LaMarche, that explained the backstory of Plus Ultra, which was planned to be incorporated into an excised scene where a young Frank Walker is transported beneath the "It's a Small World" attraction, and through an informative series of displays, reminiscent of Disney dark rides.

=== Filming ===
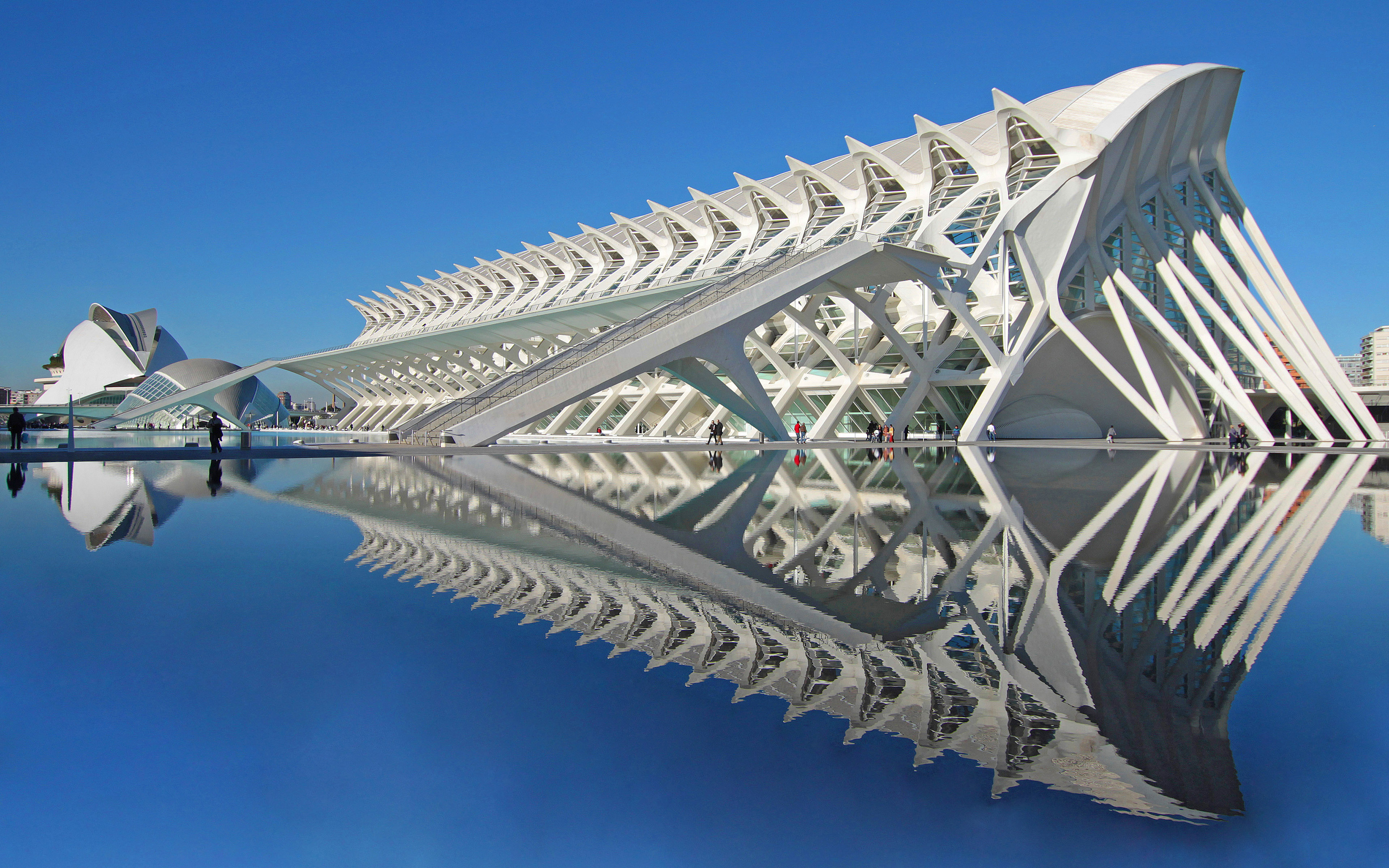
The Science Museum of the City of Arts and Sciences in Valencia was used as a background in the film.

Principal photography commenced in Enderby, British Columbia on August 8, 2013, and also filmed in Vancouver. In October, Kathryn Hahn was cast as a character named Ursula. That same month, it was announced that part of the filming would take place in the City of Arts and Sciences in Valencia. In November, scenes depicting the Newtons' hometown were shot at New Smyrna Beach, and the Carousel of Progress attraction at Walt Disney World in Florida. On February 3, 2014, additional filming took place at the It's a Small World attraction at Disneyland in California, and wrapped on February 6. The film's production designers incorporated the designs of Space Mountain and Spaceship Earth as architectural features of the Tomorrowland cityscape. Per a suggestion by Bird during production, the Walt Disney Pictures opening production logo features the Tomorrowland skyline instead of the studio's conventional fantasy castle. Industrial Light & Magic created the visual effects for Tomorrowland.

During post-production, a number of scenes featuring actress Judy Greer as Jenny Newton, Casey's (Robertson) late mother were cut in order to improve the film's runtime. Greer's role was reduced to minor cameo, while actor Lochlyn Munro, who portrayed Casey's live-in uncle Anthony, had his scenes removed completely.

=== Music ===
The musical score for Tomorrowland was composed by Bird's recurrent collaborator Michael Giacchino. A soundtrack album was released digitally on May 19, 2015, followed by a physical release on June 2, 2015. Songs not included on the album, but featured in the film include "There's a Great Big Beautiful Tomorrow" and "It's a Small World (After All)", both written by Richard M. Sherman and Robert B. Sherman, and "I Got Mine" by The Black Keys.

== Release ==
=== Alternate reality game ===
The Optimist, an alternate reality game, was created by Walt Disney Imagineering with Walt Disney Studios to create the world of Tomorrowland and to introduce the movie to the Disney theme park fan base. It occurred in a fictionalized version of Disney history and players interacted with multiple characters that led them on a hunt across a variety of places with clues and puzzles leading to more. It ran from July 3, 2013, to August 11, 2013, leading players around the Anaheim area and within Disneyland, culminating at the D23 Expo.

=== Prequel book ===
Before Tomorrowland, a prequel tie-in novel to the film, was published by Disney Press on April 7, 2015. written by Brad Bird, Damon Lindelof, Jeff Jensen, and Jonathan Case.

=== Theatrical ===
Tomorrowland held its world premiere at the Disneyland Resort in Anaheim, California on May 9, 2015. The film was released on May 22, 2015, in theaters and IMAX, and was the first film to be released in Dolby Vision format in Dolby Cinema.

Despite owning the trademark to the word "Tomorrowland" in the United States since 1970, Disney released the film in the United Kingdom as Tomorrowland: A World Beyond, and as Project T in several European markets, including the Netherlands, Belgium, and Luxembourg, because ID&T had previously registered the trademark in 2005, for their electronic musical festival of the same name. In compliance to Disney's ownership of the trademark in the United States, ID&T renamed the American version of their music festival as TomorrowWorld.

=== Home media ===
Tomorrowland was released by Walt Disney Studios Home Entertainment on Blu-ray, DVD, and digital download on October 13, 2015. Upon its first week of release on home media in the U.S., the film debuted at number 3 at the Nielsen VideoScan First Alert chart, which tracks overall disc sales, and number 4 at the Blu-ray Disc sales chart with 47% of unit sales coming from Blu-ray. The film is currently available to stream on Disney+.

== Reception ==
=== Box office ===
Tomorrowland grossed $93.4 million in the United States and Canada, and $115.6 million in other territories, for a worldwide total of $209 million, against a production budget of $180–190 million. The Hollywood Reporter estimated that the film cost $280 million to produce and market, and noted that the financial losses by Disney finished anywhere between $120 and $150 million. According to them, Tomorrowland was the third original tent-pole film of 2015 to flop, following Jupiter Ascending and Seventh Son. Walt Disney Studios Motion Pictures distribution chief, Dave Hollis, commented on the film's debut performance, saying, "Tomorrowland is an original movie and that's more of a challenge in this marketplace. We feel it's incredibly important for us as a company and as an industry to keep telling original stories."

In the United States and Canada, Tomorrowland was released on May 22, 2015, from 3,970 theaters in its opening weekend. During the four-day Memorial Day weekend, it grossed $42.7 million — the lowest opening for a big-budget tentpole since Disney's Prince of Persia: The Sands of Time, which opened to $37.8 million in 2010 — coming in first place, after a close race with Pitch Perfect 2 which grossed $38.9 million in its second weekend. Considering the film's $190 million budget ($280–330 million, including marketing costs), many media outlets considered the film's opening in the U.S. and Canada a box office failure.

=== Critical response ===
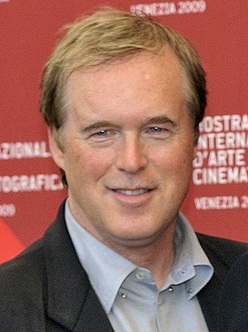
Critics' reception of Tomorrowland was mixed, but director Brad Bird felt they made the film they set out to make.

On the review aggregator website Rotten Tomatoes, 49% of 302 critics' reviews are positive, with an average rating of 5.9/10. The website's consensus reads: "Ambitious and visually stunning, Tomorrowland is unfortunately weighted down by uneven storytelling." Metacritic, which uses a weighted average, assigned the film a score of 60 out of 100, based on 48 critics, indicating "mixed or average" reviews. Audiences polled by CinemaScore gave the film an average grade of "B" on an A+ to F scale.

Peter Travers of Rolling Stone gave the film two and a half stars out of four, saying "Brad Bird's Tomorrowland, a noble failure about trying to succeed, is written and directed with such open-hearted optimism that you cheer it on even as it stumbles." Stephanie Merry of The Washington Post gave the film two out of four stars, saying "Maybe the ultimate goal of Tomorrowland remains obscure because once you know where the story is headed, you realize it's a familiar tale. The movie can conjure up futuristic images, but the story is nothing we haven't seen before." Moira MacDonald of The Seattle Times gave the film two and a half stars out of four, saying "Though it's made with great energy and inventiveness, there's something ultimately muddy about Tomorrowland; it's as if director Brad Bird got so caught up in the sets and effects and whooshing editing that the story somehow slipped away." Colin Covert of the Star Tribune gave the film two out of four stars, saying "A well-oiled machine of visuals, and yet a wobbling rattletrap of storytelling, the sci-fi fantasy Tomorrowland is an unwieldy clunker driven into the ditch at full speed." James Berardinelli of Reelviews.net gave the film two and a half stars out of four, saying "For a while, it doesn't matter that the plot meanders. The story seems like a jigsaw puzzle inviting us to solve it. That's the fun part. However, when the resolution is presented, it underwhelms." A. O. Scott of The New York Times gave the film a negative review, saying "It's important to note that Tomorrowland is not disappointing in the usual way. It's not another glib, phoned-in piece of franchise mediocrity, but rather a work of evident passion and conviction. What it isn't is in any way convincing or enchanting."

Steven Rea of The Philadelphia Inquirer gave the film two and a half stars out of four, saying "Unlikely to be remembered in decades to come — or even in months to come, once the next teenage dystopian fantasy inserts itself into movie houses."

Ty Burr of The Boston Globe gave the film two and a half stars out of four, saying "Rapturous on a scene-by-scene basis and nearly incoherent when taken as a whole, the movie is idealistic and deranged, inspirational and very, very conflicted." Stephen Whitty of The Star-Ledger (Newark) gave the film one and a half stars out of four, saying "Strip Tomorrowland down to its essentials, and you get an ending out of "I'd like to teach the world to sing" and a moral which boils down to: Just be positive, OK? So OK. I'm positive Tomorrowland was a disappointment."

David Edelstein of Vulture gave the film a positive review, stating that "Tomorrowland is the most enchanting reactionary cultural diatribe ever made. It's so smart, so winsome, so utterly rejuvenating that you'll have to wait until your eyes have dried and your buzz has worn off before you can begin to argue with it." Inkoo Kang of TheWrap also wrote a positive review, saying "Tomorrowland is a globe-trotting, time-traveling caper whose giddy visual whimsies and exuberant cartoon violence are undermined by a coy mystery that stretches as long as the line for 'Space Mountain' on a hot summer day." Brian Truitt of USA Today gave the film three out of four stars, saying "A spectacular ride for most of it, and while you're a little let down at the end, you kind of want to jump back on and do it all over again."

Linda Barnard of the Toronto Star gave the film three out of four stars, saying "Brad Bird presents a gorgeously wrought, hopeful future vision in Tomorrowland, infusing the family film with enough entertaining action and retro-themed whiz bang to forgive an awkward opening and third-act weakness." A. A. Dowd of The A.V. Club gave the film a B−, saying "Bird stages the PG mayhem with his usual grasp of dimension and space, his gift for action that's timed like physical comedy. He keeps the whole thing moving, even when it begins to feel bogged down by preachiness and sci-fi exposition." Forrest Wickman, of Slate, said the film's "politics might be a little incoherent, or naïve. It is a kids' movie, after all." Anthony Perrotta of Entropy commented that the film was inspired by the beliefs of both Walt Disney and Ayn Rand, similarly to Andrew Ryan, the villain in BioShock who constructed Rapture, a city that resembles Tomorrowland in its secrecy and intention to encourage scientific development of idealists by isolating them from the rest of the world. Amy Nicholson of LA Weekly gave the film a B+, saying "Bird has made a film that every child should see. And if his $190 million dream flops, he'll be asking the same question as his movie: When did it become uncool to care?"

=== Accolades ===
Award or film festival	Category	Nominees	Result	Refs
Art Directors Guild Awards	Best Production Design for a Fantasy Film	Scott Chambliss	Nominated	
Saturn Awards	Best Production Design	Scott Chambliss	Nominated	
Teen Choice Awards	Choice Movie: Sci-Fi/Fantasy	Tomorrowland	Nominated	
Teen Choice Awards	Choice Movie Actor: Sci-Fi/Fantasy	George Clooney	Nominated	
Teen Choice Awards	Choice Movie Actress: Sci-Fi/Fantasy	Britt Robertson	Nominated	
Visual Effects Society	Outstanding Created Environment in a Photoreal Feature	Barry Williams, Greg Kegel, Quentin Marmier, and Thang Lee	Nominated	
Visual Effects Society	Outstanding Compositing in a Photoreal Feature	Francois Lambert, Jean Lapointe, Peter Demarest, and Conny Fauser	Nominated	
World Soundtrack Academy	Soundtrack Composer of the Year	Michael Giacchino	Won	
