= American Benefit Plan Administrators =

American Benefit Plan Administrators, Inc. (ABPA), founded in 1951, was one of the oldest third-party administrator (TPA) firms in the US, managing funds created under provisions of the Taft-Hartley Act, pension plans, and voluntary employees' beneficiary associations (VEBAs). The company was based in Spring Valley, Nevada.

Prior to 2001, ABPA was publicly traded as part of PlanVista Corporation (Nasdaq: PVST). On June 18, 2001 ABPA went private when it was acquired by Sun Capital Partners, a private equity firm, through its affiliate HealthPlan Holdings, Inc.

After its acquisition by Sun Capital, ABPA's growth strategy was based mostly on growth through acquisitions. In 2003 ABPA acquired Administrative Services, Inc. of Atlanta, Georgia; OBA Midwest of Burr Ridge, Illinois; and Associated Administrators Inc. of Portland, Oregon.

In 2001, HealthPlan Holdings purchased Zenith Administrators, Inc. and merged it with its American Benefit Plan Administrators division, forming Zenith American Solutions.
