= 580 California Street =

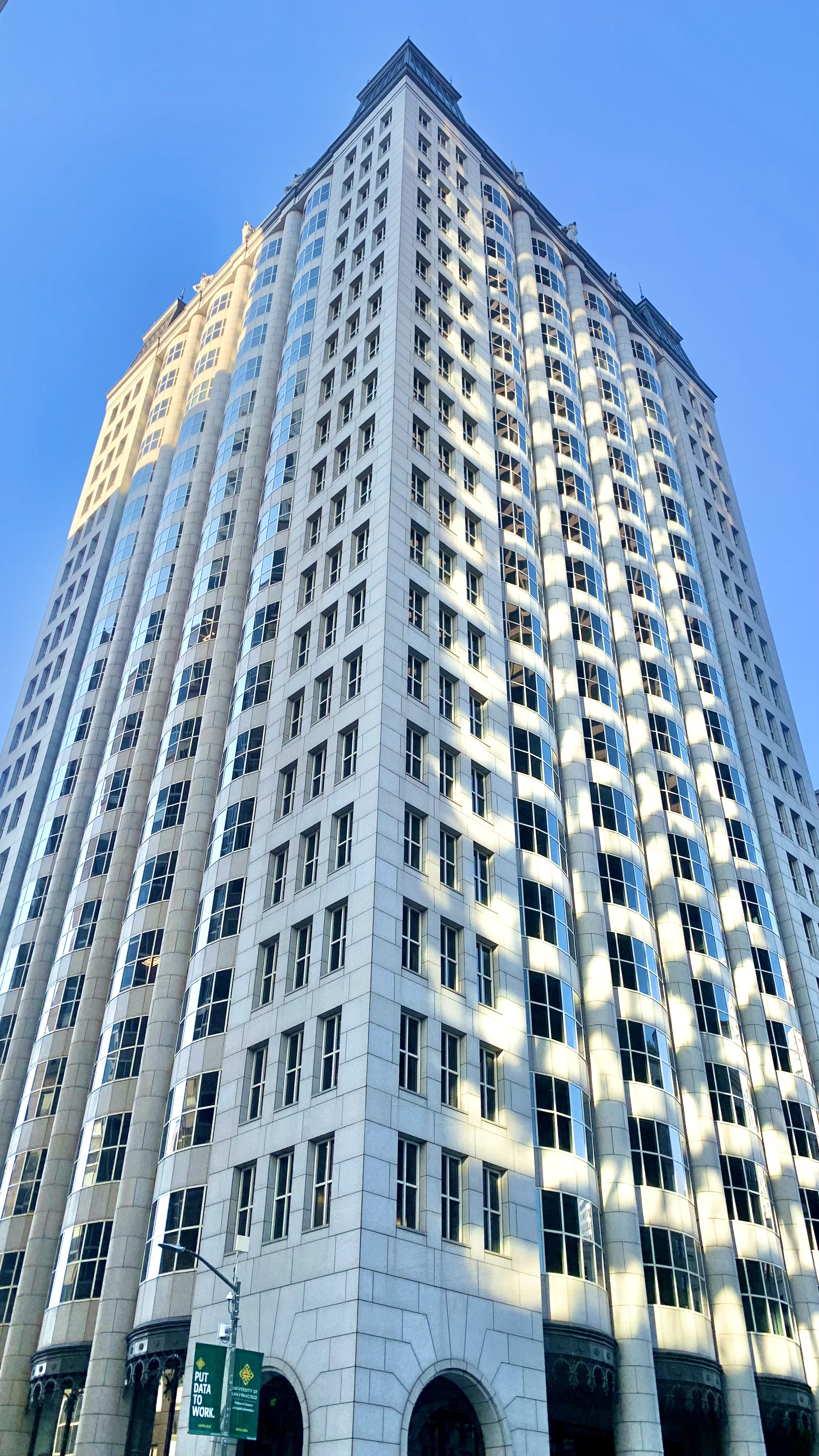
- In 2021
- Interactive map of the 580 California Street area

General information
- Type: Commercial offices
- Location: 580 California Street; San Francisco, California
- Coordinates: 37.792917°N 122.404167°W
- Completed: 1987
- Owner: Equity Office Properties

Height
- Roof: 107 m (351 ft)

Technical details
- Floor count: 23
- Floor area: 310,000 sq ft (29,000 m^{2})

Design and construction
- Architect: Johnson/Burgee Architects
- Developer: Hines Interests Limited Partnership

580 California Street is a Philip Johnson-designed high rise office building completed in 1987 in the Financial District of San Francisco, California. The postmodern, 107 m (351 ft), 23 story tower is bordered by Kearny Street and California Street, and is topped with three faceless, 12-foot (3.7 m)-tall statues, on each side of the building on the twenty-third floor. The art installation is entitled "The Corporate Goddesses" by Muriel Castanis, the late designer and creator of the sculptures.

== Tenants ==
- InSpace
- Academia.edu
- Akin, Gump, Strauss, Hauer & Feld, LLP
- CEB
- Consulate General of Canada
- Huron Consulting Group
- Northern Trust Corporation
- State Farm Insurance
- Troutman Sanders LLP
- Zenith American Solutions

== See also ==
- San Francisco's tallest buildings
