= List of alternate reality games =

An alternate reality game (ARG) is an interactive narrative that uses the real world as a platform, often involving multiple media and game elements, to tell a story that may be affected by participants' ideas or actions.

== List ==
Name	Year	Developer	Promoting	Story summary	Gameplay summary	Scale	Status
Ong's Hat	1999	Independent	N/A	A predecessor to the traditional ARG, Ong's Hat encompasses a conspiracy theory and urban legend about Princeton professors in the ghost town of Ong's Hat, New Jersey discovering a means of interdimensional travel.	Puzzle solving by online communities.	Early pioneer of alternate reality games	Complete
Majestic	2001	Anim-X	N/A	Science fiction thriller based on a Majestic 12 shadow government conspiracy theory.	Receiving clues and solving puzzles to unravel the story. Sent messages via AIM (AOL Instant Messenger), and via voice phone calls.	Recognized as the "Best Original Game" at E3 in 2001 and one of the five "Game Innovation Spotlights" at the Game Developers Choice Awards in 2002.	Complete
The Beast	2001	Microsoft	A.I. Artificial Intelligence	A murder mystery set in the future featuring artificial intelligences.	Puzzle solving by online communities. Rewards in the form of new websites and videos.	~5,000 players	Complete
ReGenesis Extended Reality	2004	Xenophile Media	ReGenesis	A biotech laboratory chases down a bioterrorist scientist alongside players	Weekly television drama filled with clues for online missions following each episode. Multiple fictional websites which feature as fictional organizations in the series.	100,000+ players.	Complete
I Love Bees	2004	42 Entertainment	Halo 2	An AI from the Halo 2 universe is stranded in our world and needs help.	Puzzle solving by online communities. Information released by phone calls to public telephones. Rewards in the form of new websites and videos.	600,000+ players.	Complete
Last Call Poker	2005	42 Entertainment	Gun	A cursed gun, passed down through generations, threatens the granddaughter of its last owner.	Puzzle solving by online communities. Real world missions in cemeteries. Online poker with dead characters. Rewards in the form of new stories and videos.	Over 500,000 active participants.	Complete
Perplex City	2005	Mind Candy	N/A	The Receda Cube has been stolen and buried somewhere on Earth.	Hidden clues on collectable puzzle cards directed players to various websites, blogs, emails, phone calls, and SMS messages, originating from Perplex City		Complete
The Charlotte Mystery	2006		AFI	Five people leave messages to each other about five types of flowers, which led to invitations to private shows by the band AFI.	Clues containing URLs, phone calls, MySpace and Aim profiles, in-person visits to a comic store and a park, a riddle in French, Craiglist listings.		Complete
Nowheremen	2007	X12 Productions	N\A	Mystery involving the disappearance of Derek Francis Border.	Interactive puzzles and treasure hunts across various mediums.		Complete
World Without Oil	2007	ITVS Interactive	Online	A collaborative storytelling game that simulated the first 32 weeks of a global oil crisis, inviting players to document their fictional lives in a world facing peak oil.	Participants contributed blog posts, videos, images, and comments to explore the social, economic, and emotional effects of energy scarcity.	One of the first ARGs with an explicit educational and social impact goal; supported by the Corporation for Public Broadcasting.	Complete
Year Zero	2007	42 Entertainment	Year Zero (album)	Set in a dystopian future where the government surveys everyone.	Players solve puzzles, listen to recordings, and watch movie clips to gain more info and find sites.		Complete
The Lost Ring	2008	AKQA	McDonald's	Six Olympians from another world came to help us save this one.	Puzzle solving by online communities. Real world missions. A new Olympic sport "The Lost Sport" was introduced.	3,000,000 players from over 150 countries.	Complete
Commander Video	2008		Bit.Trip Beat	A mysterious persona known as Commander Video issued missions to a group of ten "recruits."	Puzzle solving done by online communities. Email correspondence, Twitter, and various Internet interactions are the areas of play.		Complete
Superstruct	2008	Institute For The Future	N\A	Give humans a little more time on Earth after five "super-threats" start wearing down civilization.	Online puzzle solving.		Complete
The Jejune Institute (The Game of Nonchalance)	2008	Jeff Hull	N/A		Interactive puzzles and treasure hunts across various mediums.	7000	Complete
This Is My Milwaukee	2008	Synydyne	N\A	A sinister company creates a bioengineered creature known as Go.D.S.E.E.D. which led to the city of Milwaukee being quarantined.	Online puzzle solving with real world dead drops.		Complete
Xi	2009	nDreams	PlayStation Home	Set in secret areas in the world of PlayStation Home where users helped to find Jess and the meaning of Xi.	Users solved puzzles, watched video clips, and did objectives in and out of Home to gain more information. Users searched in Home as well as in the real world depending on the puzzle or objective.	Over 5 million visits	Complete
The Davenport Papers	2009	Brigham Young University students	The Book of Jer3miah	A tie-in to the Webby award-nominated webseries The Book of Jer3miah.	Clues were hidden in the webseries itself, related websites, and around the Brigham Young University campus.		Complete.
Picture the Impossible	2009	Lab for Social Computing Rochester Institute of Technology and the Democrat and Chronicle newspaper	Rochester, New York	Factions representing different charities compete against each other.	Explore the city to solve puzzles.	2,500 players.	Complete.
Urgent Evoke	2010	Jane McGonigal, Funded by the World Bank Institute, infoDev, the Korean Trust Fund on ICT for Development	N/A	The story was set in the year 2020 and followed the efforts of a mysterious network of Africa’s best problem-solvers.	Collaborate to develop innovative solutions to global and local problems	19,324 registered players from 150 countries	Complete
Lewis Hamilton: Secret Life	2010		Reebok	Centered around Lewis Hamilton, a secret agent in the game, showcasing a new Reebok technology such as RunTone or ZigTech.	Players worked together to solve puzzles and complete tests online, on mobiles and in the real world.	637,000 players from over 154 countries	Complete
Ben Drowned	2010	Alex Hall (Jadusable)	Independent	A haunted Majora’s Mask cartridge unleashes a digital entity named BEN. The story expands into an interactive conspiracy of a twisted corporation.	Blog posts, hidden YouTube videos, puzzles, coded messages, and audience interaction influenced the story.	Widely cited as one of the most influential internet ARGs of the decade.	Complete
Conspiracy For Good	2010	The company P	Various charities	Tim Kring's narrative focused on charity and against the fictional corporation Blackwell Briggs exploiting Africa	Players cooperated online, on mobiles and in the real world. Four big events took place in London during summer 2010.	Gamers on Unfiction, on the game web and in the streets of London during the summer events	Complete
A Map of the Floating City	2011	Thomas Dolby	A Map of the Floating City (album)	Set in a dystopian dieselpunk past, a global cataclysm has left the world's inhabitants suffering from amnesia and struggling to move north to the "Floating City" to escape the rising temperatures.	Players worked cooperatively and competitively as tribes to collect items, make inventions, solve a mystery, and move north. The game was unique in that the inventory was all based on lyrics from Dolby's back-catalog and (at the time) upcoming album of the same name. The winning coalition of tribes received a private concert as a prize.	Worldwide	Complete
Potato Sack	2011	Valve	Portal 2 and 13 indie games	GLaDOS of Portal is attempting to reboot herself. Clues were hidden in a selection of 13 independent games.	Solving puzzles using clues found in aforementioned games		Complete
The Optimist	July 3, 2013 to August 11, 2013	Walt Disney Imagineering	Tomorrowland (2015)	A fictional alternate history of Walt Disney and his involvement in a secret society connected to the 1964 World's Fair and an optimistic vision of the future.	Clues were revealed through character blogs, including scans of notes, napkins, and phone numbers. Players visited real-life locations connected to Walt Disney and gained special access to restricted areas of the Disneyland theme park.		Complete
DmC: Devil May Cry: The Eye of Dante	November 28, 2012 to May 21, 2013	Capcom	DmC: Devil May Cry (2013)	An ARG where the player joins The Order, a secret underground hacking group, to fight back against the subtle demonic subjugation of the human race.	Clues were revealed through social media blogs, including scans of promotional material and everyday objects. Players could also visit real-life locations to scan "demon propaganda" using the associated companion app to earn points. These points could be redeemed for digital artwork and ringtones, or cashed-out for a voucher of in-game currency to be used in the upcoming tie-in game, DmC: Devil May Cry.		Complete
Frog Fractions 2	2014	Twinbeard	Frog Fractions 2	A sequel to the Flash game Frog Fractions funded through Kickstarter, would only be revealed at the conclusion of this ARG, with clues hidden in a number of other games.	Podcasts by the developers, an Obama Shaving Simulator, real life events such as Indiecade and ARG-specific events around Berkley and LA.		Complete
The Black Watchmen	2015	Alice & Smith	N/A	Billed as the first permanent Alternate Reality Game, players join the ranks of The Black Watchmen, a paramilitary group dedicated to protecting the public from dangerous phenomena beyond human understanding: including ritualistic murder, occult secret societies, and the paranormal.	Puzzle solving mainly by individuals, but acts in a similar fashion to community puzzle solving ARGs.		Complete
Afterbirth	2015	Edmund McMillen	The Binding of Isaac: Rebirth	An ARG that began with the release of the Afterbirth DLC for The Binding of Isaac: Rebirth. Upon conclusion, a new playable character called "The Keeper" was implemented.	Puzzle solving by online communities.		Complete
Cipher Hunt	2016	Walt Disney Television	Gravity Falls	Taking place after the events of the series, Bill Cipher's petrified remains are hidden somewhere in America and must be found.	Players worked together to find clues and travel to areas around the world in a scavenger hunt to locate the statue and claim the "gold" hidden with it.	Worldwide, but most players were from the U.S.	Complete
Oxenfree	2016	Night School Studio	Oxenfree	Based on the game, the Oxenfree ARG delves into the true ending of the game and the secrets that the teenage characters face.	The community of the game work together to translate Morse Code, keep up with Twitter feeds, travel to locations, and call phone numbers to solve the mystery.	~900 members of the subreddit, though no community headcount has been taken.	Complete
Sombra	2016	Blizzard	Overwatch	Clues and ciphers referencing Sombra, a new playable character, were found in various developer updates and short animations released by Blizzard.	Puzzle solving by online communities.		Complete
Hello Neighbor	2017	tinyBuild, DynamicPixels	N\A	Clues in the Alpha releases of Hello Neighbor are leading to the announcement of a new release. Incomplete.	Puzzle solving, horror, adventure and general entertainment.		Ongoing
Waking Titan	2017	Alice & Smith, Hello Games	No Man's Sky	Follows experiments and technology from an organization called the Atlas Foundation. Two seasons of it were made following Loop16 (an AI) in season 1 and W/ARE (a company) in season 2.	Puzzle solving.		Complete
DEMA	2018	Twenty One Pilots	Trench	The story of a man named Clancy, escaping from an oppressive city called DEMA.	It included a cryptic series of websites (all hosted by dmaorg.info) with images, letters from the main character, and codes to decipher. It was discussed and solved in both a Reddit megathread and a Discord server. The ARG ended when Twenty One Pilots ended their hiatus with the announcement of their 5th album Trench, and the release of the singles "Jumpsuit" and "Nico and the Niners" (both of which contain elements from the storyline of the ARG).	2,000+ Twenty One Pilots fans	Complete
MILGRAM	2020 - present	Takuya Yamanka, DECO*27	N/A	MILGRAM is a transmedia project in which the development of the story changes depending on the will of the participant. You are in the position of Warden Es, and are in the position of judging 10 prisoners. Viewers vote to "Forgive/Affirm" or "Unforgive/Deny". The outcome of the story will change depending on the verdict.	MILGRAM is a project where the story unfolds as players judge the prisoners based on their own sensibilities and public opinion, similar to a jury system. You play as the guard Es, unraveling the prisoners' crimes and feelings. The story unfolds over three seasons, much like the three-tiered court system. In each season, you will complete four phases: Contact, Observation, Judgement, and Procedure. The Trial/season commences. Narrative elements are published through CDs, YouTube, Twitter, books, and the MILGRAM app. Players can submit interrogation questions for the prisoners to answer during the trial period. Players deliberate upon the narrative elements and can choose to vote on a verdict for a character on the MILGRAM website. How MILGRAM's story unfolds is affected by players' actions and deliberation. The Trial/season ends.	Worldwide. Over 150 million engagements.	Ongoing
The White Door	2020	Rusty Lake, Second Maze	Rusty Lake Games	A man awakes in a mental health facility called the White Door with no memory. The player needs to follow the instructions to find the secret of the main character and help him restore his memory.	The ARG involved people finding cubes from around the world. During the gameplay, a phone number appears after completing a puzzle. When called, a recording states that White Door is closed now, but suggests visiting another website to continue playing.		Complete
IAmSophie	2020	Tom Ransom and Dan Bolland		I am Sophie is a web-based Alternate Reality Game (ARG) that begins as a standard lifestyle vlog. The narrative quickly escalates into a psychological horror mystery involving corporate conspiracies and mind control.	Players interacted with the story by deciphering hidden codes, analyzing creepy video glitches, and finding secret links hidden within social media posts.		Complete/Hiatus
Welcome Home	2021-present	Independent	N/A	A website dedicated to a puppet show from the 1970s. The website is full of hidden secrets and is implied to be run by an individual simply named "W." who is trying to uncover a hidden truth involving the puppet characters who appear to be sentient and have dark stories of their own.	With every update, people scour the website looking for hidden clues and pages that reveal videos, audio recordings, and marketing material that slowly unveil the story. Some puzzle solving is required as players try to piece together the "behind the scenes" story of the show and what happened to each of the characters.		Ongoing
Nightbird	2024	WWE	The Wyatt Sicks	Uncle Howdy, following the death of professional wrestler Bray Wyatt, becomes disgruntled with WWE. He recruits other wrestlers to a faction called The Wyatt Sicks in an effort to retaliate.	Broadcasts of WWE programming were interrupted by glitches that displayed QR codes to pages on their website containing cryptic content. In some cases, WWE's social media profiles were "hijacked" as well. Players must explore this content to understand the context of this debuting faction.		Complete
This Is Not a Website Dot Com	2024	Walt Disney Television	Gravity Falls	A tie-in website for The Book of Bill, expanding on Gravity Falls lore. The second ARG based on the series.	After a countdown to the website's release, the site opened up as an interactive scene of a desk facing a window looking out of the Mystery Shack. Typing different words and phrases into an old computer will allow users to access additional secrets, lore, and tidbits.	Anyone with access to the internet.	Complete
Machine Girl Psychowarrior ARG	2024-2025	Machine Girl	N/A	The ARG follows PiperCo, and by extension, Global Neurosys and their attempts at rolling out a form of mind control. At a point, attention would be directed to the protagonist of the ARG who was mainly affected by these sorts of tests, and was formerly viewed as a fan within the MG community. Towards the very final segment of the ARG, there There is a large shift in the context of the narrative once it is revealed that the story itself was produced by "II Sky Interactive" by a sort of reality-altering technology. Many themes seem to be informed and inspired by "MK Ultra" and Jungian Psychology.	Fans would follow updates put out through different entities that they would be introduced to over the course of the ARG, ranging from individual characters to fictional news agencies and corporate entities. Some updates were in the form of video drops or other types of media, others would be published as more elaborate puzzles to be solved to obtain more information.	Roughly a few hundred participants	Complete
Geokill	2026	WRAPboi	N/A	An unnamed person, waking up with no memory, attempts to escape a dark, locked closet using only 3 mysterious devices. This eventually results in death, and depending on the use of the devices, gives a different message, building a story.	The 3rd device, a metal cube, acts oddly, eventually speaking, possessing an NPC, and trying to decapitate you. Many NPC's are seen, and most of them are relevant to the plot, even if it is unknown how they are. This builds up to become an unsolvable story.		Ongoing

== Media with ARG themes or elements ==
=== Television ===
- Dispatches from Elsewhere
- Westworld
- The OA

=== Films ===
- The Game
- Existenz
- The Dark Knight
- Cloverfield
- The Cloverfield Paradox
- Super 8
- Devour
- 10 Cloverfield Lane
- The Blair Witch Project
- The Institute
- The Last Broadcast
- Ready Player One
- The Batman

=== Short films ===
- This House Has People in It
- Unedited Footage of a Bear

=== Books ===
- Pattern Recognition by William Gibson
- Penny Dreadful by Will Christopher Baer
- Halting State by Charles Stross
- Little Brother by Cory Doctorow
- Cathy's Book and Cathy's Key by Sean Stewart, Jordan Weisman, and Cathy Brigg (illustrator)
- John Dies at the End by David Wong
- Mr. Mercedes by Stephen King
- Ready Player One by Ernest Cline
- This Is Not a Game by Walter Jon Williams
- Strange Flesh by Michael Olson
- The Secret: A Treasure Hunt by Byron Preiss
- S. (Dorst novel) by Doug Dorst
- House of Leaves by Mark Z. Danielewski

=== Webseries ===
- Marble Hornets
- Alantutorial
- Ben Drowned
- Petscop

=== Music ===
- No Love Deep Web by Death Grips
- Tomorrow's Harvest by Boards of Canada
- Year Zero by Nine Inch Nails
- Wallsocket by Underscores
- Coco Moon by Owl City
- POST HUMAN: NeX GEn by Bring Me The Horizon
