= John Titor =

Fictional time traveler

- First appearance: Time Travel Institute forums; 2000

In-universe information
- Alias: TimeTravel_0
- Species: Human
- Gender: Male
- Occupation: Time traveler

Titor's purported military insignia

John Titor and TimeTravel_0 are pseudonyms used in communications and on Internet forums between 1998 and 2001 by an individual claiming to be an American military time traveler from the year 2036. The communications appeared most prominently on the Time Travel Institute, an Internet forum dedicated to discussing time travel and fringe science since 1998. His posts discussed various aspects of time travel and described future calamitous events, including a global nuclear war that he predicted would take place in 2015.

The story fascinated Internet communities, but the increasing inaccuracy of the predictions and other inconsistencies led many to view it with skepticism and try to discover who created it. A 2009 investigation suggested that the affair was a hoax started by Larry Haber, a Florida entertainment lawyer, or one of his brothers, John Rick Haber or Morey Haber, both of whom have careers in computers and information technology. However, the Habers and other suspects have denied these reports, and no one has publicly claimed to be the originator of the Titor posts.

== Titor's posts ==
=== Faxes to Art Bell ===
The earliest known communications attributed to the Titor persona were two faxes sent to Art Bell, the host of the paranormal-focused radio show Coast to Coast AM. The first fax, dated July 29, 1998, described the invention of time travel in 2034 as a byproduct of CERN research, claiming the technology produced "a contained singularity engine" with rotating singularities controlled by magnetic fields. The fax predicted widespread devastation from the Y2K disaster and the collapse of the United States government. It also described an impenetrable temporal barrier at the year 2564, beyond which "nothing exists." A second fax followed shortly after, in which the sender promised to provide pages from "the operations manual of my time machine" and photographs of the vehicle. The second fax also urged Bell to reconsider his views on Russia, claiming they would "eventually save this country and the lives of millions of Americans."

=== IRC Chats ===
Before appearing on the Time Travel Institute forums, the individual using the name TimeTravel_0 participated in an IRC conversation on October 14, 2000, with several participants including users known as Yareisa, G°, and wyrmkin_37. In this conversation, TimeTravel_0 claimed to be 38 years old, from Florida, and based at MacDill Air Force Base in Tampa. He stated he had been sent back to 1975 to retrieve an IBM 5110 computer, mentioning this model specifically four times during the chat.

He predicted civil war in the United States and nuclear conflict involving Russia and China — claims that would later be repeated and elaborated upon in his forum posts. Beginning with his November 2, 2000 posts on the Time Travel Institute forums, TimeTravel_0 shifted to referring to the IBM 5100 instead, making no public acknowledgment of the discrepancy. The IBM 5100 was released in 1975, while the IBM 5110 was its successor released in 1978. TimeTravel_0 also sent correspondent Pamela Moore a physical piece of an IBM 5110 label with an Orlando postmark, consistent with his initial IRC claim.

=== Forum posts ===
John Titor's military insignia appeared on the Time Travel Institute forums on November 2, 2000, under the username TimeTravel_0. The name "John Titor" was not used on these posts. The forum, which had been established in 1998 as a community for discussing time travel theory and related fringe topics, already had an active membership who engaged critically with the claims. The first post appeared in an existing thread titled "Time Travel Paradoxes," started by a forum member named Paul, who had been discussing theoretical approaches to the grandfather paradox. TimeTravel_0 responded that "the basics for time travel start at CERN in about a year and end in 2034 with the first 'time machine' built by GE."

The posts discussed time travel in general, the first being a "six parts" description of the components required for a working time machine, followed by responses to questions from other forum members about how such a machine might work. These early posts tended to be short. A second thread was started in January 2001 due to shortcomings of the forum software used at the time, and a third thread, "Parallel Universe," emerged in December 2000 as the discussion expanded beyond the original topic. Forum members challenged the technical claims, questioned inconsistencies, and pressed for verifiable details throughout the exchanges.

In January 2001, TimeTravel_0 began referring to himself as "John Titor" and also started posting at the Art Bell Post-2-Post BBS Forums. The final Titor post was made in late March 2001.

Later, around 2003, various websites compiled Titor's posts, rearranging them into narratives. Not all of these sites refer to the original dates that the messages were posted on the forums.

=== Claims ===
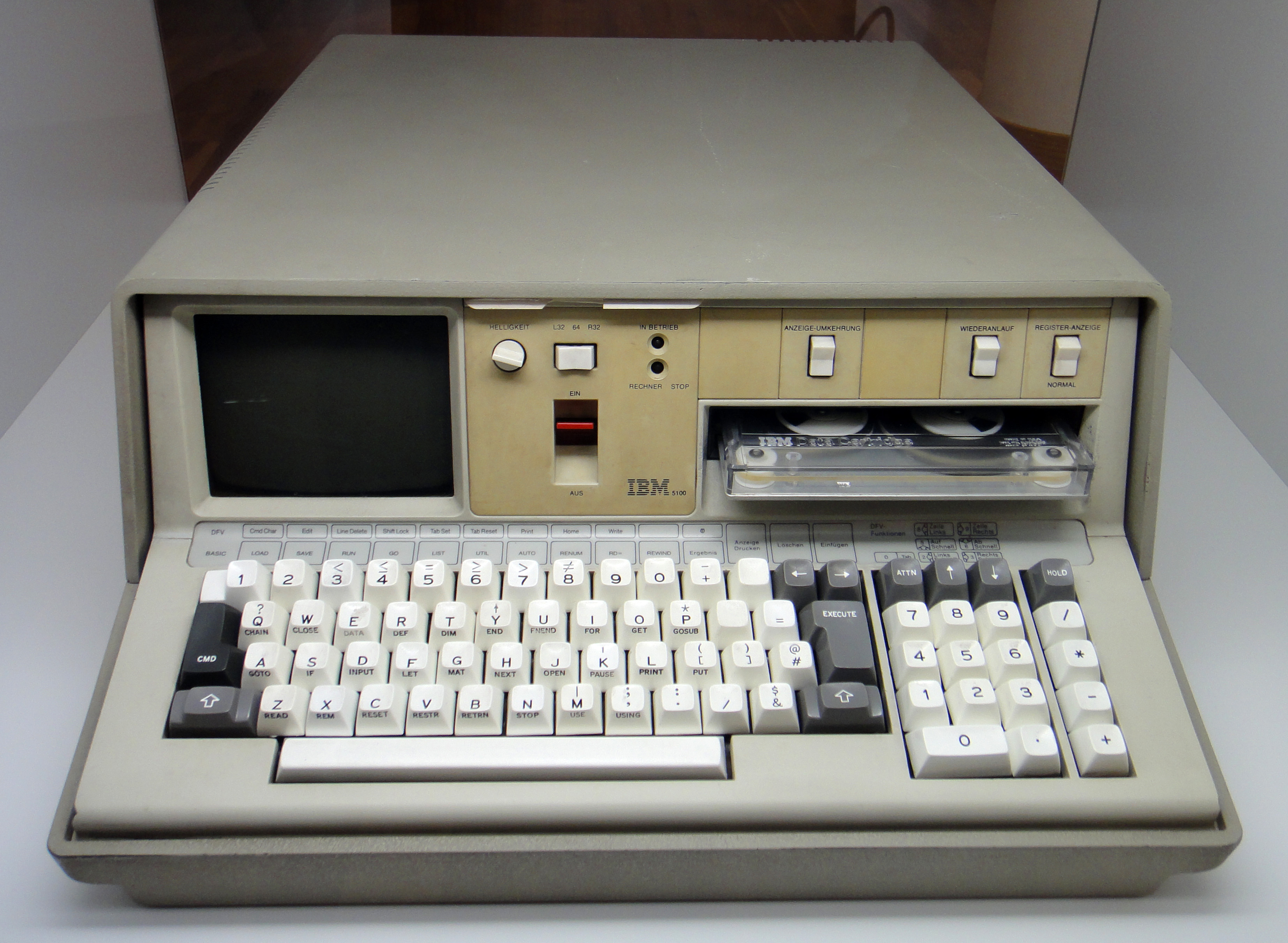
IBM 5100 computer

In his online postings, Titor claimed to be an American soldier from the year 2036, based in Tampa, Florida. He said that he was assigned to a governmental time-travel project, and that as part of the project he was sent back to 1975 to retrieve an IBM 5100 computer, which was needed to debug various legacy computer programs that existed in 2036 — a possible reference to the UNIX year 2038 problem. Titor specifically claimed the IBM 5100 had an undocumented ability to emulate IBM System/370 mainframes and translate between their machine code and more modern languages — a capability needed to debug the legacy systems. This feature of the 5100 was not widely known at the time of Titor's posts, but had been confirmed by engineers who worked on the machine, leading some observers to conclude that whoever was behind the posts had insider knowledge of the 5100's architecture.

Titor said that he had been selected for this mission because his paternal grandfather was directly involved in the original assembly and programming of the 5100. He attempted to provide proof of this by describing the unpublicized features of the machine, which led some people to believe that a computer scientist must have been behind the postings.

Titor said that he was on a stopover in the year 2000 for "personal reasons": to collect pictures lost in the (future) civil war, and to visit his family, of whom he spoke often.

Titor also said that for several months he had been trying to warn anyone who would listen about the potential threat of Creutzfeldt–Jakob disease spread through beef products, and about the possibility of an upcoming civil war within the United States.

When questioned about the topic, Titor also expressed interest in mysteries such as UFOs, which he said remained unexplained in his time. Titor suggested that UFOs and extraterrestrials might be time travelers with superior time machines, from much further into the future than his own time.

=== Time machine ===
Titor described his time machine on several occasions. In one early post, he described it as a "stationary mass, temporal displacement unit powered by two top-spin, dual positive singularities", and producing a "standard off-set Tipler sinusoid".

The earliest post was more explicit, detailing the components of the machine:

- Two magnetic housing units for the dual micro singularities
- An electron injection manifold, to alter mass and gravity of the micro singularities
- A cooling and X-ray venting system
- Gravity sensors, or a variable gravity lock
- Four main cesium clocks
- Three main computer units

According to the posts, the device was initially installed in the rear of a 1967 Chevrolet Corvette convertible for the trip to 1975. In later posts, Titor stated that the device had been transferred to a 1987 truck with four-wheel drive for his stopover in the year 2000.

=== Predictions ===
Although he frequently invoked the many-worlds interpretation of quantum mechanics, whereby events from his timeline may differ from our own, Titor also said that the differences would be minimal. As such, some have interpreted his descriptions of his timeline as predictions, and have compared them with actual historical events that have occurred since Titor's final post in 2001.

The most immediate of Titor's predictions foretold a civil war in the United States having to do with "order and rights". In a post on the Art Bell Post-2-Post forums dated February 1, 2001, Titor said the war would begin in 2004 with civil unrest surrounding the presidential election of that year. According to Titor, this civil conflict, which he described as "having a Waco type event every month that steadily gets worse", would be "pretty much at everyone's doorstep" and erupt into full-scale war by 2008. As a result, the United States would split into five regions based on a variety of factors, including differing military objectives.

According to Titor, this civil war would end in 2015 with a brief but intense World War III, in which nuclear weapons were deployed against major cities — an event Titor referred to as "N Day". He specified Washington, D.C. and Jacksonville, Florida as cities that would be hit in the exchange, and said that after the war, Omaha, Nebraska would be the new U.S. capital. Titor did not detail the exact causes of this World War III scenario, but in one post said that the hostilities were led by "border clashes and overpopulation". He also pointed to the contemporary Arab-Israeli conflict not as a cause of the war, but as a milestone that precedes it.

Titor said that in 2011, when he was 13 years old, he joined a Florida-based shotgun infantry unit called the Fighting Diamondbacks for at least four years. In other posts, he described himself as hiding from the war.

Titor also said that the "Everett–Wheeler model of quantum physics", better known as the many-worlds interpretation, was correct. According to him, this meant that his time travel had caused the formation of a new timestream, and that in this new (current) timestream, the events that Titor had described would occur somewhat differently than they had in his home timestream. This made his predictions non-falsifiable.

== Criticism and discussion ==
The New Republic described Titor as the most famous of several Internet forum posters who claimed to be time travelers.

An Italian television program, Voyager — Ai confini della conoscenza, aired the results of an investigation of John Titor on May 19, 2008. Private investigator Mike Lynch found no registry evidence, past or present, of any individual named John Titor. He did, however, identify the John Titor Foundation, which was a for-profit company formed on September 16, 2003, and had no office or address other than a rented mail box in Kissimmee, Florida. An IP address connected with Titor also geolocated to Kissimmee.

In 2009, a report by John Hughston of the Hoax Hunter Web site pointed to Larry Haber, a Florida entertainment lawyer, as the CEO of the foundation. Lynch concluded that Larry Haber and his brother Richard, a computer scientist, were very likely the men behind John Titor, whom they actually introduced in 1998, accompanied by different predictions, including chaos due to the Y2K "bug". John Hughston also reported that John Titor is a trademark registered with the United States Patent and Trademark Office; the Titor trademark is now classified as "Abandoned".

In 2018, multimedia artist Joseph Matheny, creator of the alternate reality game Ong's Hat, said that he worked as a consultant for the unnamed individuals responsible for the legend. John Titor "is a story that was created as a literary experiment by people who were observing what I was doing with Ong's Hat and these people wanted to do something like that. I was a consultant on the project, [but] it wasn't my project."

== Archival record ==
The original forum threads on the Time Travel Institute remain the primary documentary record of the Titor posts, preserving the complete chronological sequence of claims and community responses as they occurred between 2000 and 2001. The forum, which has maintained continuous access to the original material since the posts were made, has been cited as a primary source by journalists and researchers, including The Telegraph, The New Republic, and Thrillist. The 1998 faxes to Art Bell and the October 2000 IRC conversation log are also preserved on the forum.

In 2003, the John Titor Foundation published a book, John Titor: A Time Traveler's Tale (ISBN 1-59196-436-9), which compiled and annotated the posts; the book is now out of print. A separate Web site, johntitor.com, also compiled the posts around the same time, rearranging them into a narrative format, though it did not always preserve the original posting dates.

== In popular culture ==
- The 2009 visual novel Steins;Gate, which was adapted into an anime in 2011, heavily features time travel and incorporates the John Titor legend as a major plot element, including references to the original forum posts and the IBM 5100 mission.
- In 2009, a docudrama called Timetravel_0 was directed by Scott Norwood.
- Titor was referred to in the shonen supernatural horror manga Magical Girl Apocalypse.
- Japanese rock band Sōtaisei Riron's third studio album, TOWN AGE, featured a song, John Q, which references John Titor.
- In an issue of The Unbeatable Squirrel Girl, John Titor is listed in the Deadpool's Guide to Super Villains card set as an alias of Kang the Conqueror.
- In the video game Reverse: 1999, John Titor is a senior computer engineer from IBM claiming to be a time traveler who speaks in Hexadecimal code and was also behind the development of the IBM 5100.
