= Ong's Hat, New Jersey =

Ghost town in New Jersey, USA

- Former village
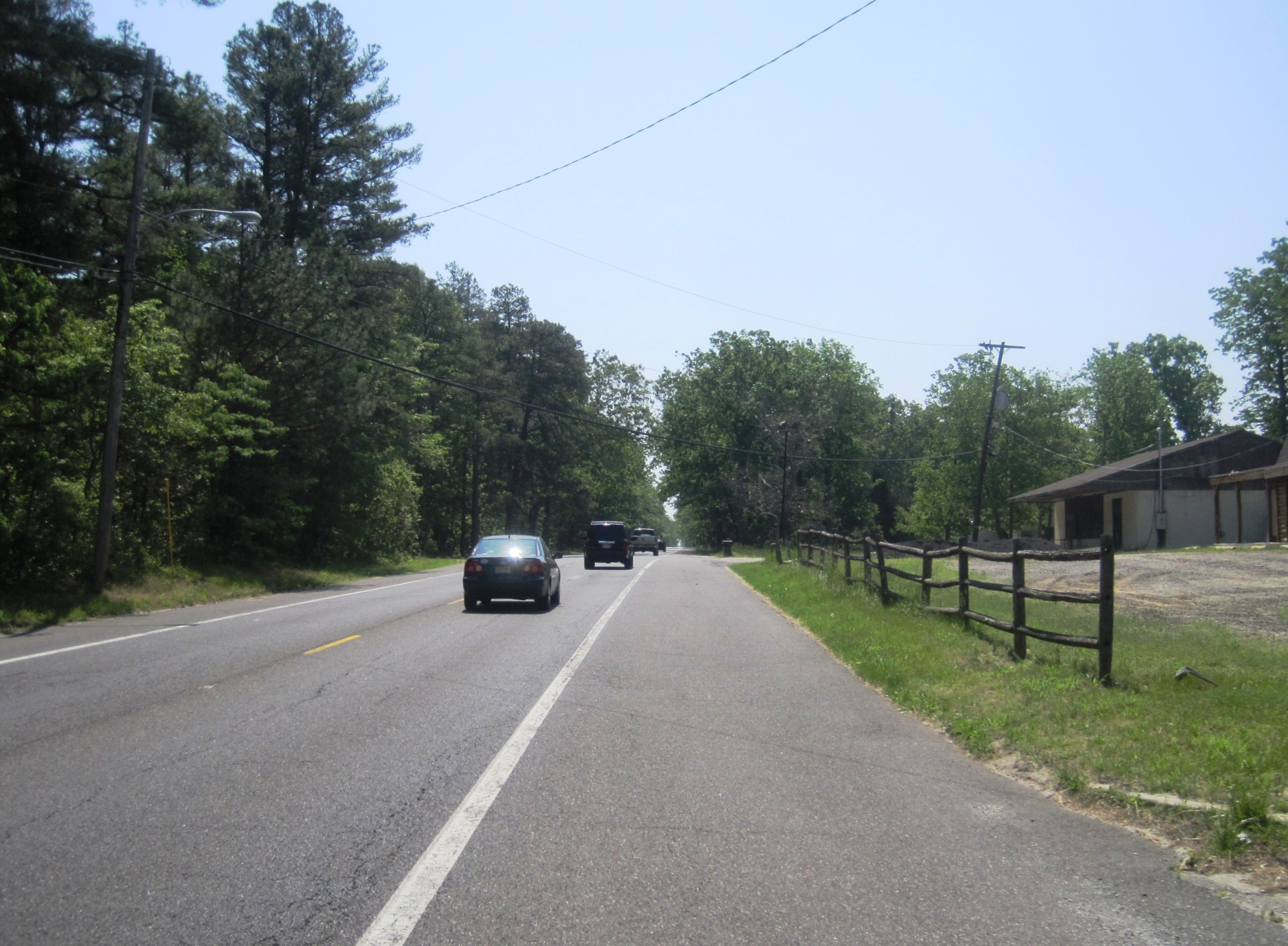
- Along Magnolia Road (CR 644)

- Location within Burlington County, New Jersey Location within New Jersey Location within the United States
- Coordinates: 39°54′39″N 74°37′15″W
- Country: United States
- State: New Jersey
- County: Burlington
- Township: Pemberton
- Elevation: 98 ft (30 m)
- Time zone: UTC−05:00 (Eastern (EST))
  - Summer (DST): UTC−04:00 (Eastern (EDT))
- GNIS feature ID: 878993

Ong's Hat (also Ong) is a ghost town in Pemberton Township, Burlington County, in the U.S. state of New Jersey. It is located on Magnolia Road (CR 644) west of the Four Mile Circle, where Route 72 intersects with Route 70. It is the northern terminus of the Batona Trail.

Although it was never more than one hut ("Ong's Hut"), it still appeared on some maps as of 2006. A road in the area is named Ong's Hat Road. It is also called the Buddtown-Ong's Hat Road. It was completed in 1929, replacing an earlier dirt path.

== Name ==
The name of the place may have originally been Ong's Hut, referring to an overnight shelter built by a farmer of that name; see below.

A well-known folk story attributes the name to a local man who was a fixture at local dances, wooing women with his suave attire, especially his silk hat. The surname Ong was common among early Pine Barrens settlers, and one of the earliest settlers was named Jacob Ong. One story of the origin of the name is that at one such dance, a jealous lover stomped on his hat, ruining it, and in frustration Ong tossed it in the air, where it caught on a high branch of a pine tree. The hat remained there for many years, serving as landmark which identified the small village. At least four other versions of this legend circulate. One version simply ends with his hat being stomped on, while the most widely circulated one ends with him throwing it in the tree. The other two hold that Ong was a tavern keeper who either painted a silk hat on his sign or threw his hat into a tree after getting angry with a woman.

== History ==
The name of the area predates the revolutionary war. The location "Ong's" appears on a 1778 map of Hessian encampments in New Jersey. According to Forgotten Towns of Southern New Jersey by Henry Charlton Beck, Ong's Hat was a real village. According to Beck, around the 1860s, Ong's Hat was a lively town and served as a social center for the surrounding area. It was known for the availability of alcohol and one of the first arrests of a bootlegger occurred at Ong's Hat. Prizefighting was also popular.

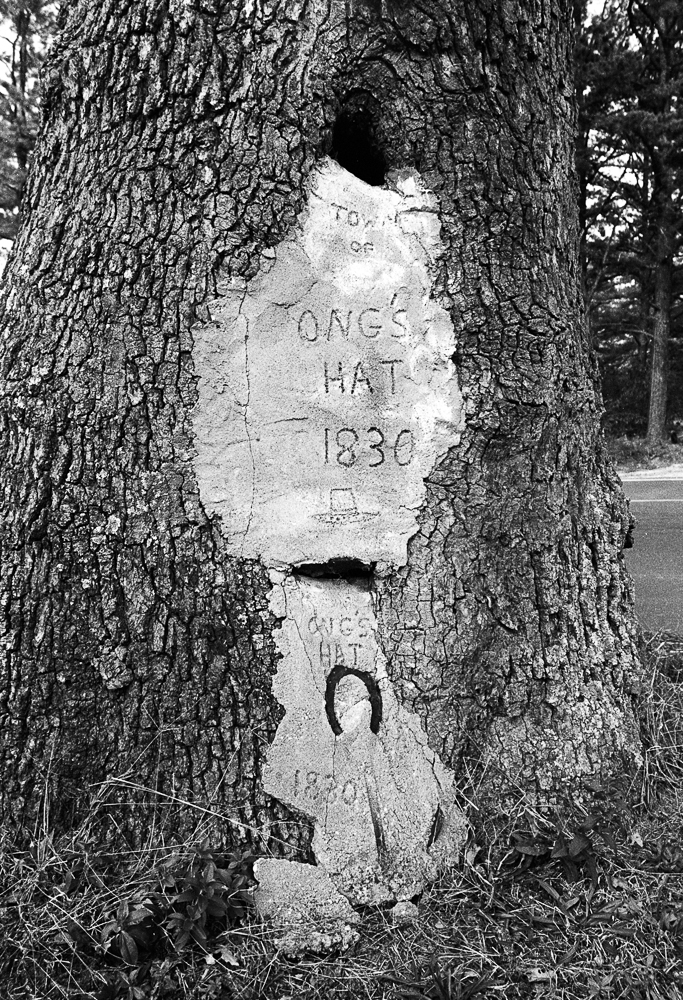
Ong's Hat, c. early 1970s

Beck says that a Polish couple, the Chininiskis, moved to Ong's Hat in the early 20th century. By that time only seven residents remained. The Chininiskis disappeared soon after. Years later, hunters found a female skeleton at Ong's Hat, which police speculated was that of Mrs. Chininiski. Tracking Mr. Chininiski to New York but unable to prove anything, Burlington County Sheriff Ellis H. Parker kept the skull in his office for many years as a reminder of the unsolved case.

By 1936, Ong's Hat was still on maps but nothing was there except a clearing, an abandoned shed, and bits of brick and roofing suggesting houses had once been there. When Beck visited he found only Eli Freed, a 79-year-old farmer who moved to the area from Chicago. In the foreword to the 1961 edition of the book, Beck reports that Freed no longer lived at Ong's Hat and that additional legends concerning the village had emerged.

A 1968 letter published in The New York Times, written by an Ong family descendant, claims reports of an actual town are a misnomer. Instead, he says his ancestors lived in Little Egg Harbor in the early 17th century and transported their grain to Burlington, New Jersey for grinding. They built a hut midway through the route where they could rest overnight, and according to the letter the name Ong's Hut was added to maps and gradually corrupted to Ong's Hat.

In his 1944 book Jersey Genesis, Beck himself says in reporting on Ong's Hat he fell for "elaborate traps" and that the story he had earlier repeated was a "fairy tale". He then subscribes to the explanation that the name is a corruption of Ong's Hut, a stopover point for a farmer from Little Egg Harbor.

== Urban legend ==
The town of Ong's Hat was the setting for a series of fictional conspiracy theory themed stories from the 1980s onwards, known as Ong's Hat, in which a group of scientists was able to travel to a parallel dimension from a site in the township.

The story originated in Joseph Matheny’s book, The Incunabula Papers: Ong's Hat And Other Gateways To New Dimensions. In his book, written in the first person, he tells the story of an investigative journalist trying to uncover the truth about the mysterious town, detailing everything that is happening there.

Matheny intended the book to be entertaining and viewed as a work of fiction, but many regarded the stories as factual evidence of a scientific conspiracy, with Matheny's denials being a result of government persecution.

== Popular culture ==
- Ong's Hat appeared in an episode of Yours Truly, Johnny Dollar. The appearance was in episode 577 of the radio program Yours Truly Johnny Dollar, entitled "The Durango Laramie Matter", which aired 02/23/1958. Yours Truly, Johnny Dollar is a radio drama that aired on CBS Radio from February 18, 1949 to September 30, 1962.
