= The Book of Jer3miah =

American web series

- Genre: Suspense; Thriller; Drama
- Created by: Jeff Parkin
- Starring: Jared Shores; Jeffrey Blake; Camee Anderson Faulk; Blayne Quarnstrom; Richie Uminski; Becca Ingram; Jourdan Lance; Christopher Sherwood Davis
- No. of seasons: 1
- No. of episodes: 20

Production
- Executive producers: Jared Cardon; Jeff Parkin
- Running time: 2–15 min.
- Production company: Tinder Media

Original release
- Release: 3 February – 12 June 2009

The Book of Jer3miah is an American live-action web series created by a group of Brigham Young University students and faculty members. It follows the experience of college freshman, Jeremiah Whitney, who accepts the charge to protect a mysterious Mesoamerican box. When Jeremiah's parents are mysteriously murdered, Jeremiah learns that he is the target of a frightening conspiracy, requiring courage and faith to escape. Every facet of his life is called into question, and now he must uncover the truth about the box, the conspiracy, and his very identity, before it's too late. The series follows Jeremiah as he defends his life and the lives of his friends from the mounting threats that surround them. The show's first season, due to funding constraints, was created with almost no budget and consists of 20 two- to fifteen-minute webisodes. The series also incorporates an alternate reality game with its hub at TheDavenportPapers.com.

== Production ==
=== Influences ===
The project is inspired by Web 2.0 fiction like Gemini Division, 24's The Rookie, and webisodes from The Office. It also follows the interactive nature of Bungee's I Love Bees experience, The Truth About Marika, and BMW's The Hire game. It is the first known university-sponsored web series that uses transmedia storytelling, and also the first Latter-day Saint themed web series.

Tonally, the show has been compared to serialized programs like Lost, 24 and Twin Peaks. It has also been compared to the fictional works of filmmaker Richard Dutcher and LDS author Orson Scott Card, whose article, "The Problem of Evil in Fiction", was used extensively by the BYU class when developing the series.

=== Concept ===
The series is a pioneering program aimed to produce entertaining and accessible new media for Latter-day Saint audiences, as well as for general audiences and families. It was designed and intended to be a participation drama. The project uses Vimeo for video hosting, and involves viewers through Twitter, Facebook, and custom Ning networks. It is a class project created by Theater & Media Arts associate professor Jeff Parkin and produced by Jeff Parkin, Jared Cardon, and over 30 students. Without a textbook, the planning and conceptualization for the series were assisted by concepts derived from readings in Wired magazine, the writings of Henry Jenkins, and the writings of Gideon Burton. The webisodes incorporate themes from The Book of Mormon, and the plot involves Utah and Mormon folklore, especially myths and Native American legends surrounding Manti, UT.

=== Themes ===
Jeremiah must resolve his aching need for an orienting identity. Ironically, that is what Mormonism is all about. Latter-day Saints claim an eternal identity; however, the media productions of Mormonism are seldom about feeling all the more lost and endangered for having a spiritual and eternal identity. This series sits on the edge of Mormonism, taking its ideas of eternal progression and individual mission so seriously that the stakes are realized in human terms, with evil as present and potent a reality as God.

— Gideon Burton, "The Book of Jer3miah: New Media Mormonism"

=== Distribution ===
The first three webisodes premiered in the Varsity Theater on the Brigham Young University campus, as well as online. Subsequent episodes debuted on www.jer3miah.com every Friday, with the season finale airing on 12 June 2009.

A novel, The Book of Jer3miah: Premonition, based on the webseries was published on 4 March 2013.

== Alternate-reality game ==
=== Premise ===
In addition to traditional webisodes, the project includes an interactive online experience through TheDavenportPapers.com, ZoobyNews.com, and other sites. Viewers work together to uncover the plot of the series from clues within the show and online puzzles. The game also extends to physical clues around the Brigham Young University campus including statues, plaques, and GPS locations where more clues are hidden.

== Reception ==
=== Awards ===
On 14 April 2010, the 14th Annual Webby Awards, hailed as the "Oscars of the Internet" by The New York Times, announced that The Book of Jer3miah was selected as an Official Honoree in the Drama category for Online Film & Video. The list of honorees also includes productions from Sony Pictures Television, Disney-ABC, BET, and IFC.

=== Critical reception ===
Jill Weinberger of the New York Times called it "a tight, suspenseful little series [that] may just have what it takes to get web audiences to utter the words 'Mormon conspiracy thriller' without a touch of irony." This article reviewed the series from several angles, including overall success, religious implications, characters, writing, acting, and direction. She compares it to other web series, noting that it is "a big leap forward in terms of university-sponsored transmedia content, and yet, the online collaboration between fans is so fervent that you don’t have to be anywhere near the campus to be part of the action." "There’s quick dialogue, funny supporting characters. It’s [an] engaging piece of new media."

Kent Larsen wrote an article for [Times & Seasons], entitled "Jer3miah, The Great Mormon Novel, and The Problem with Mormon Media". The article states that "Jer3miah breaks some of the taboos" established in Mormon media, i.e., "because we [Mormons] have been persecuted and continue to be criticized, we must shield ourselves and our practice from outsiders to maintain how sacred it is. Our image must be faultless, so that no one will be dissuaded from investigating the Church because of our faults." The articles uses The Book of Jer3miah as an example of breaking this trepidation. Larsen says, "The real solution to our [Mormon] image is, of course, to let people see us and understand us. When we portray our sacred in film and fiction, others will believe that our sacred is, in fact, sacred, although, admittedly, at the risk that others will ridicule." Regarding this discussion, Jeff Parkin is referenced as saying the following in the article:

"The Book of Jer3miah" is unapologetically Mormon. Why? There are many reasons – but for this discussion, I’ll highlight two: 1) Telling stories about Mormons and about being Mormon is not a crime; 2) Telling a story about Mormons requires being 100% true to their Mormon-ness – this means capturing how they speak, what they do, and what they believe. We have tried to be true to our characters and their beliefs by not hiding them and by not being ashamed of them.

— Jeff Parkin, "Jer3miah, The Great Mormon Novel, and The Problem with Mormon Media"

In Gideon Burton's article, "The Book of Jer3miah: New Media Mormonism", he wrote, "Parkin's creation swims upstream against the well-established modes of Mormon media, but there is a confidence to the production, a palpable enthusiam echoed in the fanbase and the ancillary media filling out the series folklore." "One could say Jer3miah is more intimate with things Mormon than more official Mormon productions. For example, inherent in Mormonism is a deep-seated sense of history and a connectedness to past and future generations. The dramatic translation of those concepts within Jer3miah is cliff-hanging events that turn on genealogical information and on strange visitors invoking the ancient Nephite setting of the Book of Mormon. Like the embattled hosts within the more epic portions of the Mormon bible, Jeremiah finds himself facing secret combinations of evil."

Adam Greenwood wrote an article, entitled "The Book of Jer3miah". Greenwood examines the show from a critical and doctrinal standpoint saying that "The Book of Jeremiah shares the realization that verisimilitude in fiction is a means, not an end. The story takes us full-bore into a world where 3 Nephite folklore and secret conspiracies and all the weird Manti stories and the Holy Ghost telling you to do inexplicable things are all true. I was half-fascinated, and half-horrified that someone who wasn’t a Mormon might be watching this stuff."

It's good. It's very good. It's the strangely beautiful love child of Lost and Johnny Lingo.

— Adam Greenwood, "The Book of Jer3miah"

Liz Shannon Miller of NewTeeVee published an article, entitled "Rant: Rumors of the Death of Web Series Have Been Greatly Exaggerated". Within the article she lists The Book of Jer3miah as one of "10 quality indie shows, made in the last year." Shannon Miller says that "niche shows have popped up that appeal to specific communities, for example, The Book of Jer3miah was made for Mormons, by Mormons. And that’s one of the brilliant things about the current state of the medium – under-served audiences are finally getting content, and reasonably well-made content, that appeals to them.

=== Fan response ===
On February 2, 2009, The Daily Universe ran an article about The Book of Jer3miah, including interviews with series creators Jeff Parkin and Jared Cardon.

On March 6, 2009, The Daily Universe ran another article about The Book of Jer3miah, this time focusing on the ARG aspect of the show and only interviewing participants of the game.

== Episodes ==
Episode #	Title	Original Air Date
1	A Gift, a Record	3 February 2009
On his 18th birthday, Jeremiah Whitney receives a new hand-held, video camera from his parents. He does not know that it is recording when he gets it out of the box and records another college student as she walks by Jeremiah and his parents. Jeremiah wants to show his roommate, Porter, his birthday gift, and so, before leaving for a family reunion in Manti, they lock the car and head inside. In the building's entry, various students greet him and his parents. One of the other students wants him to film something that night with his new camera and two other students remind Jeremiah about Family Home Evening. He shows off the new camera to other students in his dorm and then Jeremiah and his parents walk upstairs to meet Porter. After an awkward exchange between Jeremiah's parents and Porter, they return to the car and discover a mysterious message addressed to Jeremiah that was left in his parents' locked car. The message says, "Manti Library," and Jeremiah asks who knew that they were going to Manti. Jeremiah's father tells him to turn off his camera.
2	A Sacred Trust	4 February 2009
Jeremiah holds the mysterious note in his hand as they travel in the car to Manti; he is determined to discover the truth behind the note's strange appearance. After Jeremiah's father decides to ignore "one of Jeremiah’s feelings", that they should go to the Manti Library, a large semi-truck without license plates nearly runs them off the road. They stop at the Manti library, and though it is past closing time, he discovers a woman waiting for him there in secret. She takes Jeremiah and his parents to a hidden vault that is below the library where Jeremiah discovers that it is not, in fact, his birthday. He was actually born 8 months earlier. The woman presents Jeremiah a mysterious Mesoamerican box and tells him of his sacred obligation to protect it, in spite of the dangers that will follow. Strange and frightening noises come from outside the library. Confused at what he should do, Jeremiah listens to the Holy Ghost and decides reluctantly to accept the charge.
3	Detour	5 February 2009
Driving away from the library, Jeremiah feels prompted that they should pull of the road again. His parents protest that they are late for the family reunion. Jeremiah makes up an excuse and they pull over at a gas station. Jeremiah goes inside the mini-mart with the mysterious box, which is now in a bag, unsure of why he felt so strongly to get off the road. As he leaves the mini-mart, a suspicious employee sees the bag and grabs for it. Jeremiah struggles to keep a hold of it. Outside, a semi truck swerves past the gas station and Jeremiah hears a loud crash. He breaks free from the employee and runs outside to see that the semi truck has hit the car where his parents were waiting. Panicked, Jeremiah drops the box and runs towards his parents' car. As he runs away, a mysterious figure takes the box away. There is an explosion that destroys his parents' van; his parents are now dead.
4	Porter's Call	12 February 2009
The police finish their investigation at the scene of the accident and take Jeremiah back to the dorms. Jeremiah returns to his room where Simon, Brian, and Porter are playing an RPG. Jeremiah says nothing, but Porter can tell something is wrong with Jeremiah and kicks the other guys out. Porter tries to get Jeremiah to open up, but to no avail. Before going to sleep, Porter sees a mysterious car watching their room from across the street. He hears voices instructing him to look after Jeremiah. A voice, for example, says, "He’s my only son. Protect him". Porter covers Jeremiah with a blanket and blocks the doorway with a chair that he sits in. As he falls asleep, he hears the same voice instructing him to keep Jeremiah safe.
5	Departure	20 February 2009
Porter and his girlfriend, Lilah, find Jeremiah at the cafeteria. Porter wants to know what is wrong, but Jeremiah, still devastated by his parents' deaths, is not talking about it. As they try to lighten his mood, Claire Warren, a fellow student who is in Jeremiah's ward and who clearly has a crush on him, interrupts the conversation. She apologizes to him about the tragedy when Megan, the school's head, student reporter, interrupts and embarrasses her in front of Jeremiah. Megan tries to get an interview with Jeremiah about the accident, claiming that he needs to set the record straight about his parents' death. This is when Porter and Lilah finally find out about what happened. Megan keeps pushing for an interview and Porter starts to get protective of Jeremiah. Overwhelmed, Jeremiah leaves to catch his flight to his parents' funeral.
6	Coming Home	27 February 2009
Jeremiah attends his parents' funeral in Seneca Falls, NY. Afterward he walks home alone. He arrives at his parents' home and sees that the mailbox is empty. He walks the long driveway and discovers that his parents' house is on fire. Two men see Jeremiah, get in a truck, and chase him down the road. Before Jeremiah dives into the bushes, he sees a note left in his parents' mailbox. He grabs it and hides just before the truck reaches him. A man looks for Jeremiah from the truck with a flashlight, but cannot see him. Jeremiah grabs his video camera and films the man in the truck. After the man drives off, he inspects the note. It is his adoption papers from when he was a child. He plays the videotape from before, when his mom wrapped the camera on his birthday. Both of his parents talk to the camera wishing him a happy birthday.
7	Back to School	6 March 2009
Jeremiah returns from his parents' funeral and runs into Claire, who is carrying a glass, baking dish, outside the dorm as he gets his bags from the airport shuttle. She can tell something is wrong and invites him to a get-together. They arrive and Jeremiah finds out that what they are at is Ward Prayer. Jeremiah is feeling melancholy and does not want to be at Ward Prayer. She unintentionally hurts his feelings as she mentions his mom, and he decides to leave. When he arrives at his dorm room, something is wrong; it has been trashed, ransacked, and Simon is knocked out and tied up in the closet. Suddenly a shadowy figure grabs at Jeremiah from behind the door. Jeremiah wrestles free and narrowly escapes, running down the hallway.
8	Abide with Me	13 March 2009
Jeremiah wrestles free from the man in his dorm room and narrowly escapes, running down the hallway. The man chases Jeremiah across campus. Meanwhile, Porter and Brian return to the dorms and find Simon tied up. They speculate on what had happened and Porter realizes Jeremiah is in danger. After he leaves, Brian discovers Jeremiah's adoption papers and photographs them as evidence of a potential conspiracy. In the meantime, just when it seems like Jeremiah has eluded his pursuer, he drops his video camera and is caught in a parking garage. The man in black demands that Jeremiah tell him where the box is. Jeremiah says he does not know and the assassin starts to strangle him. Porter, who is looking for Jeremiah, sees his camera and heads to the parking garage. He arrives and knocks out the assassin. Porter and Jeremiah escape, and Jeremiah tells Porter the whole story about the box.
9	Lineage	13 March 2009
In their dorm room, Porter asks Jeremiah if he wonders who his real parents are. He tries to convince Jeremiah to investigate his lineage, but Jeremiah does not want to. Brian, who had planted a microphone in their room, listens to their conversation. They leave to go to their class, Doctrines of the Old Testament. While Jeremiah is gone, Megan tries to break into his dorm room to learn more about him, but Brian and Simon stop her. Megan turns up the charm and both acquiesce to giving her all the info they have on Jeremiah, including the photo of his adoption papers and something about "the box". Megan reports this intelligence to her faculty mentor, who demands she find out more about the box. Meanwhile, the lecture in Jeremiah and Porter's Old Testament class, which is about spiritual lineage, convinces Jeremiah to delve deeper into his adoption.
10	Constance	13 March 2009
Lilah and Porter take Jeremiah to meet Constance, Lilah's grandmother, who works at the Family History Center. Constance interviews Jeremiah about his situation and tells him that legally he will not be able to find out who his real parents are. Constance suggests that a mitochondrial DNA test would be the best place to start in figuring out who Jeremiah's real parents are. As she goes to pick up the testing kit from her car, a mysterious bearded man stops her and asks her to deliver a note to Jeremiah. She is worried about his intent, but is ultimately convinced when she feels prompted that the note will help make Jeremiah safer to do so. She takes the note and the man suddenly disappears. She returns to Jeremiah, gives him the DNA test and the note, and sends him on his way. As Jeremiah leaves, he opens the note. It says for him to meet at mile marker 3 in Manti, UT.
11	Mile Marker 3	3 April 2009
Jeremiah follows the instructions on the mysterious note and goes to Manti. Desperate to please Megan, Brian breaks into Jeremiah's room while he is gone and steals the mysterious note, texting a photo of it to her. Jeremiah meets the mysterious man, Ammon. He is forced to leave his cell phone and they travel on horseback. Lilah and Porter mail Jeremiah's DNA test. Jeremiah and Ammon ride until they are followed by an unseen danger. They leaver their horses and travel on foot until they arrive at a sacred cave. Ammon tells Jeremiah that only those divinely chosen are allowed to enter. Jeremiah is one of those chosen; his birth father and parents were others. Ammon asks Jeremiah to record what he sees with his video camera, so Jeremiah begins filming as he enters the cave. There, sitting on one of three stone pedestals, is the box that Jeremiah left at the gas station.
12	The Box	10 April 2009
Confused and frustrated by all the frightening things that keep happening in his life, Jeremiah demands that Ammon give him answers about his birthparents and the box. Ammon shows him a picture of the day he was adopted. The picture shows Jeremiah's parents and Ammon. He says he cannot answer any of Jeremiah's questions until he has proven himself unconditionally trustworthy. Jeremiah goes to leave, but an assassin blocks the exit. The assassin shoots Ammon in the chest and moves for the box. As he touches the box, he is knocked unconscious by an unseen energy. Jeremiah cannot believe what just happened, and the voice of God speaks to him, telling him that he must kill the assassin. Jeremiah does not want to kill the man, but decides to do what God told him. Taking a sword, he stabs the assassin. Overwhelmed, Jeremiah falls to the cave floor. Ammon, still alive, asks Jeremiah to search the assassin. Jeremiah does so, and finds the assassin's phone.
13	Call on Him Often	16 April 2009
Jeremiah helps Ammon out of the cave. He is devastated by the fact that he just killed a man and feels guilty for having originally lost the box. Ammon pulls a Book of Mormon from his coat pocket and finds the bullet lodged therein. Ammon comforts him, reminding him that he can regain the box as long he continues to draw close to God through scripture and prayer and to rely on the friends he can trust. Jeremiah returns to the dorms and the Book of Mormon that was shot falls from his coat. He decides to kneel and pray. During his prayer, the assassin's phone buzzes. Jeremiah uses the Book of Mormon to decrypt the phone's password and discovers that there is a hidden camera in his room. He finds the camera and destroys it.
14	Promises	24 April 2009
Jeremiah and Claire decorate for a party. Claire asks Jeremiah if he could teach the lesson for Family Home Evening next week. Eavesdropping, Megan hears Jeremiah almost decline because he wants to hear his favorite band play that night. However, Jer3miah decides to take the high road and teach the lesson. He and Claire flirt, and he asks her if she wants to team-teach the lesson with him. She takes him up on his offer. Porter asks about the big bruise on Jeremiah's face. Brian overhears Jeremiah tell Porter that an assassin followed him to Manti, and somehow had the Manti note on his phone. Concerned about Jeremiah's safety, Brian confronts Megan about the Manti note. Megan lies and tells Brian and Simon it was stolen from her, and then manipulates them into hiding a spy camera on Jeremiah's coat. Megan tells Jeremiah that she has two backstage passes to the concert he had mentioned earlier, and convinces him that he can bail out on teaching family night just once.
15	Secret Combinations	1 May 2009
Porter confronts Jeremiah about how depressed he has been recently. Jeremiah confides that he killed the assassin in the cave because God told him to do it. Stunned, Porter tries to tell Jeremiah it will be okay. Jeremiah expresses how hard it has been for him, even though he knew that what he did was right. Porter tells Jeremiah he has to get out of bed and come with him to a play that night. Jeremiah shows up for the play, but instead of Porter being there, Claire is there in his place. They watch the play and Jeremiah is haunted by his memories of the killing. Claire is concerned for him. They walk home together holding hands, and nearly kiss before being interrupted by students leaving the building. Claire reminds Jeremiah about the Family Home Evening lesson they will be teaching together, but Jeremiah leaves without telling her that he is going to the concert.
16	The Date	11 May 2009
Porter lectures Jeremiah about not going to Family Home Evening. Jeremiah suggests that Porter teach an "object lesson". On his way out, Jeremiah runs into Claire and says that he will not be able to teach with her because of something that came up. He arrives at the concert and meets Megan. The main group is not starting for a while and so she takes Jeremiah to the basement where a rave-like party is happening. She introduces Jeremiah to an influential business magnate, Luc Dahl, who offers to help Jeremiah pay his way through school if he can postpone his proselytizing mission for a few months. Jeremiah starts to realize that he is in bad company, so he leaves the party to try to make it back to Family Home Evening. As Jeremiah leaves, Megan sees him get jumped and kidnapped by an assassin.
17	The Break	15 May 2009
Megan watches her phone that shows the feed from the camera that was pinned to Jeremiah's jacket. The men that kidnapped him are torturing Jeremiah. She confronts her faculty mentor, Brenna, about the kidnapping and tries to have her call the police. Brenna says that the only reason they have Jeremiah is due to Megan. Megan says that they told her that all they wanted was to talk to him, so she tried to back out of her job. Brenna says that Megan does not know what is in the box or what it can do. Brenna blackmails Megan into staying and continuing to gather intelligence for the organization because this opportunity will move her career substantially. Megan agrees to keep working for the organization. Jeremiah is tied to a chair in a utility closet.
18	Interrogation	29 May 2009
Jeremiah is tied to a chair and is interrogated by a British assassin. The assassin tries to get him to divulge the location of the cave and the box. He watched footage from Jeremiah's camera. He tells Jeremiah that he met Jeremiah's parents once, when he killed them, driving a semi truck. Porter teaches Family Home Evening because Claire never showed up. Megan arrives and asks for his help. He refuses and Lilah offers to give her a ride home. When Jeremiah will not give in and tell him where the cave and box are, the assassin brings in Claire, bound and gagged. He threatens to kill her if Jeremiah does not talk. Jeremiah realizes he cannot break his oath to protect the box and denies the assassin's request once more. As the assassin fires his gun at Claire, Jeremiah and Claire miraculously disappear, leaving the assassin all alone.
19	Friends and Family	5 June 2009
Porter is concerned about how Jeremiah never returned home from his date with Megan. He tries calling him on his cell phone multiple times, but cannot get in touch with him. He falls asleep in his chair. The next morning, Lilah arrives with the results of Jeremiah's DNA test: his mother's bloodline traces back to Guatemala. His father's bloodline was mysteriously untraceable. With Brian and Simon's help, they decide to go to Manti to find Jeremiah. Brian suggests that they invite Megan to come along. Lilah agrees and thinks that Megan could use a good drive after last night. Porter grudgingly agrees. At the car, Porter apologizes to Megan and says that he was just worried for Jeremiah and Claire. Megan did not know that Claire did not come back from Family Home Evening. Megan gets a phone call and declines at the last minute to not go. She lies to the person on the phone and says that she did not get to them on time and that they left without her.
20	Birthright	12 June 2009
Jeremiah and Claire awake in the woods near the cave in Manti. A fire is going and three horses are nearby. Porter, Lilah, Brian, and Simon travel to Manti to find Jeremiah. Simon reveals that they knew about Jeremiah's adoption and when confronted by Porter, Brian lies about how Jeremiah asked for their help. Brenna does not believe that they left Megan behind. Megan's phone is disconnected unexpectedly and Brenna receives a call from Z. Ammon says Jeremiah has passed his test of faith because of his willingness to die to protect the box. Z confronts Brenna. He has Megan tied up and says that she willingly let the others go to Jeremiah without her. Z sends an assassin to capture the box. Jeremiah, Claire, and Ammon finish breakfast. He tells Claire that her friends are on their way to pick her up. Jeremiah apologizes to Claire for having put her in such a dangerous position. Claire leaves on horseback and finds Porter, Lilah, Brian, and Simon. Ammon gives the box back to Jeremiah. He also reveals to Jeremiah that his birth father is one of the Three Nephites, three immortals who serve Christ on earth until his second coming.
