= Alice & Smith =

Canadian video game developer

- Industry: Video Games
- Founded: 2014
- Headquarters: Montreal, Canada
- Key people: Andrea Doyon (CEO), Nathalie Lacoste
- Website: www.aliceandsmith.com

Alice & Smith is a Canadian transmedia storytelling and video game developer that specializes in alternate reality games. The company was founded in 2014 and is based in Montreal, Canada.

== History ==
Alice & Smith was founded in 2014 by Nathalie Lacoste and Andrea Doyon in Montreal, Canada. The company created The Secret World spin-off The Black Watchmen, the company also created ARGs for games such as No Man's Sky and Vampire: The Masquerade – Bloodlines 2.

== Products ==
The company developed XR Server, a visual management tool available on Microsoft Azure.

In 2019, the company worked with Funcom, a Norwegian-based game developer, to create an AI-based storytelling experience for the ARG game Cyrano Story.

In 2021, the company launched StreamFlare, a livestreaming solution that allows streamers to engage directly with their audiences.

== Games ==
- The Black Watchmen (2015)
- Ahnayro: The Dream World (2016)
- NITE Team 4 (2019)
- Cyrano Story (2020)

== Alternate reality games ==
- Waking Titan (2017)
- Tender (2019)

== Awards ==
| Years | Award | Work | Result | Ref |
|---|---|---|---|---|
| 2019 | NUMIX Independent Game Award | NITE Team 4 | Won | |
