= Joseph Matheny =

American writer and transmedia artist

- Born: December 24, 1961 (age 64); Chicago, Illinois
- Citizenship: American
- Occupations: Writer, artist, inventor
- Website: josephmatheny.com

Joseph Wayne Matheny (born December 24, 1961, in Chicago, Illinois) is an American writer and transmedia artist who has created works using alternate reality gaming and transmedia storytelling methods. He holds patents for prediction, recommendation and behavioral analysis algorithms and software design. He is a published author of screenplays, white papers, technology, sci-fi, marketing and gaming books. He is probably best known for the avant-garde work Ong's Hat, which has been called the proto-alternate reality game (ARG). Ong's Hat is often cited as the first ARG on many lists of alternate reality games.

He currently resides in Eugene, Oregon.

== Early life ==
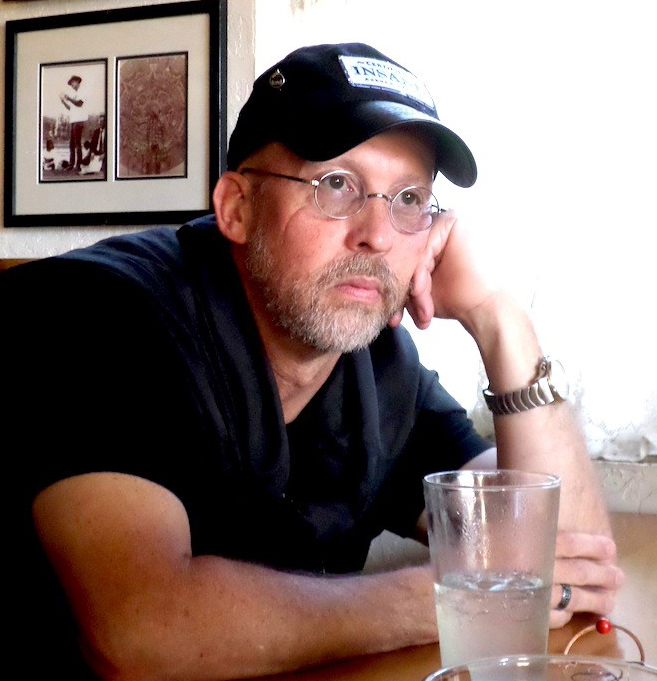
Joseph Matheny- 2018 Santa Cruz, CA

Matheny was born in Chicago, Illinois in 1961 and moved to California in 1989.

== Books ==
- Ong’s Hat: Compleat, Wildcard Interactive, 2025. ISBN 979-8305379754
- Statio Numero: Part 3 of the Liminal Cycle, Wildcard Interactive, 2022. ISBN 979-8-89074-509-5
- Xen: The Zen of the Other (as Ezra Buckley), Wildcard Interactive, 2020. ISBN 9798710187395
- Liminal (as Cameron Whiteside), Wildcard Interactive, 2017. ISBN 9798602894813
- Ong's Hat: The Beginning: Authorized Version, Wildcard Interactive, 2002. ISBN 978-1726734691
- Game over?, Immersion New Media, 2002. ISBN 0-9674890-0-8
- Why DVD? A Meat and Potatoes Guide for the Uninitiated, Metalepsis, 1999. ISBN 0-9674890-0-8
- The Incunabula Papers: Ong's Hat and Other Gateways to New Dimensions, eXe, 1999. ISBN 0-9674890-1-6

=== Contributions to other books and publications ===
- Reality is What You Can Get Away With: Introduction
- Conversations with Diane Di Prima: Contributor
- The Big Black Book: Become Who You Are: Contributor
- Beats In Time: A Literary Generation's Legacy: Contributor
- Rebels and Devils: The Psychology of Liberation: Contributor
- Black Book Omega: Cirque Apoklypsis: Contributor
- YouTube: An Insider's Guide to Climbing the Charts: Contributor
- Black Book Volume 3, Part I: The Black Symphony, First Movement: Contributor
- Black Book Volume 3, Part II: The Black Symphony, Second Movement: Contributor
- What Would Bill Hicks Say: Forward- Contributor
- Exquisite Language: Contributor
- Poker Without Cards: Contributor-Forward, Afterward and Editor
- This Is Not A Game: A Guide to Alternate Reality Gaming: Contributor and Editor
- Covert Culture Sourcebook: Contributor
- The Millennium Whole Earth Catalog: Contributor

== Filmography ==
=== Feature films and documentaries ===
- My Neighbors Daughter (1998): Art Director, Actor
- Amerikanskaya doch (1995): Art Director, Actor
- Mary Jane's Not a Virgin Anymore (1997): Actor
- The "I" in the Triangle with Robert Anton Wilson (2010): Director
- TAZ: The Temporary Autonomous Zone (2010): Producer, Performer
- Inside A Mind (2021): Appears as self
- Visions Of Heaven and Hell (1994):ITV UK Appears as self

== Discography ==
- Ong's Hat: COMPLEAT (2025) Wildcard Interactive
- This Is Not a Game with Marc Fennell (2024) Audible/BBC
- The Incident at Ong's Hat- audio drama (2023) BBC
- Xen: The Zen of the Other- audio drama (2021) Wildcard
- Robert Anton Wilson Remembered (2011) Hukilau
- Robert Anton Wilson: The Lost Studio Sessions (2010) Original Falcon
- TAZ- The Temporary Autonomous Zone (2010) Original Falcon
- The Banishing Ritual with Illusion of Safety (1991)
