= Anders Gronstedt =

Swedish-born American author and public speaker (born 1965)

Anders Gronstedt (born October 6, 1965) is a Swedish-born American author, public speaker and entrepreneur. He is an advocate of virtual reality and augmented reality training, transmedia storytelling and game-based learning and president of the Gronstedt Group.

== Background and career ==
Gronstedt received his MBA from the Stockholm School of Economics and his Ph.D. in journalism and mass communication from the University of Wisconsin-Madison, in 1994.

He was an assistant professor in marketing at the University of Colorado at Boulder 1994–97.

In 1997, he founded the Gronstedt Group. As president of this firm, he helps global companies like Google, Intuit, GE, United Healthcare, Deloitte, Dell, Avaya, American Eagle Outfitters, Microsoft, Kimberly-Clark, and government clients like the U.S. Department of Transportation and the City of New York improve performance with next-generation digital simulations, gaming, and immersive 3D virtual worlds. He is considered a learning visionary championing immersive learning approaches.

== Publications ==
In 2000, Gronstedt wrote the book The Customer Century, based on hundreds of hours of in-depth interviews with senior marketing and corporate communications managers from top companies such as Hewlett-Packard, Ericsson, Philips, and Xerox about how to integrate communications.

His 2007 Harvard Business Review article chronicles how companies like EMC and IBM use podcasting to train employees.

Gronstedt has written three ATD Infoline monograms:

- Basics of Pod Casting (May, 2007)
- Training in Virtual Worlds (March, 2008)
- Learning Through Transmedia Storytelling (January, 2014) with Marc Ramos

Gronstedt wrote two chapters in The Handbook of Strategic Public Relations and Integrated Marketing Communications, Second Edition, and one chapter in Karl Kapp's The Gamification of Learning and Instruction Fieldbook: Ideas into Practice.

Recent TD Magazine and CLO Magazine articles by Dr. Gronstedt focus on virtual and augmented reality in learning.
