= Vampire: The Masquerade – Bloodlines 2 =

2025 video game

- Developer: The Chinese Room
- Publishers: Paradox Interactive; White Wolf Publishing
- Directors: Alex Skidmore; Dan Pinchbeck; Ed Daly
- Producer: Ross Manton
- Designer: Alex Skidmore
- Programmer: Nick Slaven
- Artist: John McCormack
- Writers: Dan Pinchbeck; Ian Thomas
- Composers: Craig Stuart Garfinkle; Eímear Noone; Rik Schaffer
- Series: Vampire: The Masquerade
- Engine: Unreal Engine 5
- Platforms: PlayStation 5; Windows; Xbox Series X/S
- Release: 21 October 2025
- Genre: Action role-playing
- Mode: Single-player

Vampire: The Masquerade – Bloodlines 2 is a 2025 action role-playing video game developed by The Chinese Room and published by Paradox Interactive and White Wolf Publishing. A sequel to Vampire: The Masquerade – Bloodlines (2004), it is set in the World of Darkness and follows an original narrative focused on the Elder vampire Phyre, who awakens in early 21st-century Seattle during a historic snowstorm. As the city's Camarilla struggles in the aftermath of a failed coup and a renewed inquisition, Phyre becomes entangled in the conflict between factions of vampires, hunters, and the resurgent Sabbat while uncovering the truth behind a mysterious brand suppressing their powers.

Players control Phyre primarily from a first-person perspective, exploring an open-world depiction of Seattle divided into five districts. The game emphasizes traversal, investigation, dialogue, and supernatural combat, allowing players to customize Phyre's clan, abilities, outfits, and backstory. Feeding on humans replenishes blood used to power Disciplines (supernatural powers), while stealth, persuasion, and manipulation can shape relationships with characters and factions.

Development of Bloodlines 2 began under Hardsuit Labs in the mid-2010s before successive delays and production issues resulted in a shift to The Chinese Room in 2021. The Chinese Room retained the Christmas-time Seattle setting and much of the original art direction but rebuilt the game with a revised RPG system and narrative, while experiencing further delays.

Vampire: The Masquerade – Bloodlines 2 was released for PlayStation 5, Windows, and Xbox Series X/S on 21 October 2025. The game received mixed critical reviews, drawing praise for its narrative, and criticism for the gameplay and design. It also failed to meet the studio's sales targets, resulting in significant financial loss.

== Gameplay ==
Vampire: The Masquerade – Bloodlines 2 is an action role-playing video game presented mainly from the first-person perspective, with third-person used for some actions and conversations. The game takes place in a fictional version of Seattle spread across five districts: Uptown, Financial, Downtown, Chinatown, and Industrial. The districts are presented as a seamless open world, requiring no loading to move between them.

Players primarily control the Elder vampire Phyre throughout the game. Phyre's gender, hair, clan, and outfits can be customized. The player must assign Phyre to one of six clans: the Brujah, who focus on aggressive, close-range melee combat; the Tremere, who specialize in long-range blood sorcery to manipulate their own, or others', blood; the Banu Haqim, who favor stealth approaches; the Ventrue who rely on mental manipulation; the Toreador, who rely on seduction; and the Lasombra, who wield the shadows as a weapon. During specific sections of the narrative, the player can control the Malkavian vampire Fabien.

Phyre can access the Disciplines (abilities) from other clans by forming alliances with and feeding on other vampires. These Disciplines vary in cost depending on how closely they align with the player's own clan's skillset. For example, a Brujah vampire—focused on strength, speed, and presence through the Disciplines of Celerity, Potence, and Presence—will find it cheaper to acquire similar powers than unrelated ones such as the stealth Discipline Obfuscate. Players can accumulate and stack multiple clan perks, offering a wide range of customisation and power. However, each clan retains a unique passive ability exclusive to them. Each clan has a variety of thematically fitting outfits that are unlocked based on the different Disciplines that have been earned. Phyre possesses supernatural strength, speed, and durability, greater than those of average vampires, and telekinetic abilities. They also have supernatural senses, giving Phyre abilities including being able to detect beating hearts through walls.

Combat in Bloodlines 2 combines basic physical attacks with vampiric powers, including telekinesis. Phyre can also use well-timed dodges to stun opponents. As the player upgrades Phyre, they unlock abilities such as Blood Curse, which manipulates an enemy's blood to make them explode; Possession, which allows the player to control a target; Recall, which allows Phyre to teleport to a set location; and mass Hypnosis, which can affect multiple enemies or compel them to commit suicide. Powers can also be combined—for example, forcing enemies to drop their weapons through mind control and then using telekinesis to steal the weapon, or manipulating an exploding enemy into a larger group to maximize damage. Enemies include humans, ghouls, and other vampires, who possess their own supernatural abilities to counter Phyre.

Phyre's dialog options and character reactions are influenced by their customizable backstory, clan, reputation, and appearance. Reputation is shaped by relationships with individual characters and factions, who respond differently based on previous interactions. For instance, if Phyre was previously rude to a character and later attempts to be friendly, the character may interpret the behavior as sarcastic or insincere. Dialogue choices made in group conversations can affect each character's opinion of Phyre individually. As a centuries-old vampire, Phyre has a detailed background and legend, but players are able to further define this through their choices, such as confirming or denying details when talking to others.

Blood is Phyre's main source of healing and required to use their powers—for instance, Blood Curse costs three blood points. Blood points are replenished by feeding on characters in the environment or weakened enemies during combat, though feeding leaves the player vulnerable to attacks from others. Blood can have "resonances" based on the emotions of the target. Feeding targets are typically in one of three potential blood resonances: Melancholic (anxious or afraid), Sanguine (feeling aroused), and Choleric (annoyed or angry). The targets must be converted to full resonance by manipulation through conversations. Fully resonated targets can also be found by chance. Once enough resonances are collected, certain vampires from different clans can allow Phyre to feed on them, awakening their connection to that clan's respective abilities. In addition to blood, Phyre can use elixirs to restore health and blood, boost attack damage, and reduce damage.

Feeding on humans, or using certain vampiric abilities in their view, constitutes a masquerade violation—exposing the existence of vampires. Too many violations can result in Phyre being pursued by vampire hunters, the police, or other vampires. There are progressive stages of masquerade violations: "Upheld" caused by minor infractions such as being seen running supernaturally fast; "Caution" is triggered by multiple minor infractions or more obvious acts such as being caught feeding; and "Engaged/Broken", where the police actively hunt the player. If the player progresses beyond this, the Camarilla will step in to put a permanent end to Phyre. Non-player characters (NPC) can interact with each other: for example, if a police officer sees a character attacking Phyre without cause, they may attack the human in response.

== Synopsis ==
=== Setting ===
Set in the World of Darkness, Vampire: The Masquerade – Bloodlines 2 depicts a world in which vampires, werewolves, demons, and other creatures shape human history. The vampires are bound by a code—the Masquerade—to maintain their secrecy and avoid unnecessary killing, which helps preserve their last shreds of humanity. They are divided into various clans, each with distinctive traits and abilities: The Toreador are passionate and the closest to humanity; the Ventrue are noble, powerful leaders; the Brujah are rebellious fighters; the Malkavians are cursed with insanity but blessed with insight; the Gangrel are loners who are in sync with their animalistic nature; the secretive and untrustworthy Tremere wield blood magic; the Nosferatu are condemned to a life in the shadows due to their monstrous appearance; the Banu Haqim strictly adhere to a personal moral code, punishing those who defy it; and the Lasombra are known for being cruel and power-hungry. The clans are loosely governed by the Camarilla, a cabal that enforces the vampire code. The Camarilla is opposed by two main factions: the Sabbat, vampires who embrace their bestial nature, and the Anarchs, an idealistic group that opposes the Camarilla's oligarchic political structure, believing all vampires should share power. Thinbloods are a rapidly growing, weaker strain of vampires who are typically shunned by full vampires.

Bloodlines 2 takes place in early 21st-century Seattle at Christmastime, during a historic snowstorm. Since the events of Bloodlines, the Vatican has launched a second inquisition—a mass purge of supernatural creatures. The city's long-ruling Camarilla has been weakened by an attempted coup and the assassination of its prince, while the Anarchs seize the opportunity to expand their influence.

=== Characters ===
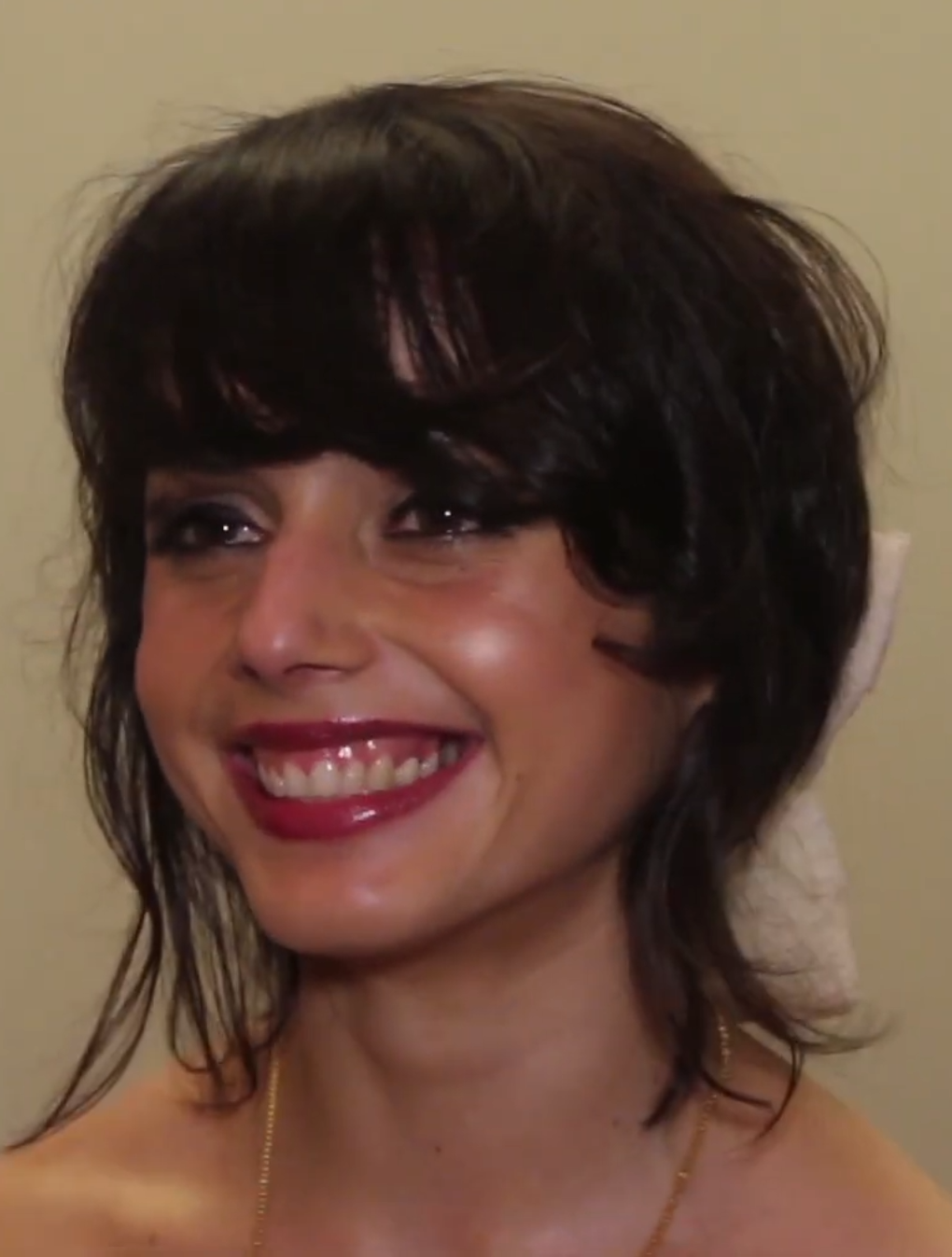
Amrita Acharia (pictured in 2014) voices the Tremere vampire Safia Ulusoy.

The player controls a 400-year-old Elder vampire known only as "Phyre" or "Nomad" (voiced by Hara Yannas as a female and Tommy Sim'aan as a male)—though neither is their true name—who is infamous among kindred for their presence at pivotal historical events. A century ago, Phyre vanished in Tunis, only to awaken from a long torpor in modern-day Seattle. Phyre soon discovers that their powers are restrained by a mysterious magical brand, and they are haunted by the disembodied voice of Fabien Laguna (Ronan Summers), a Malkavian and private investigator. Fabien's detective persona is a coping mechanism for his clan's curse, allowing him to navigate the world and maintain a fragile sense of stability.

Other characters include the influential former Seattle prince, Lou Graham (Jane Perry), acting prince Ryong Choi (Kae Alexander), Safia Ulusoy (Amrita Acharia), Michael "Tolly" Tolliver (David Menkin), Katsumi Ishizaka (Elizabeth Chan), Ysabella Moore (Joan Iyiola), and Gideon Hall (Alec Newman). Phyre's journey brings them into contact with Kindred including Fletcher (Rufus Wright), Amelia Thorn (Bethan Dixon Bate), Simeon "Silky" Ladock (Alan Turkington), Niko Angelov (Martin Razpopov), Patience Boswell (Billy Peck), Onda Cardoso (Jamilya Ocasio), Max Webber (Osy Ikhile), Willem Axel (Richard Brake), and volatile Camarilla sheriff Benny Muldoon (Patrick O'Kane).

Human characters include Latoya Baker (Tanya Moodie)—leader of the Information and Awareness Office (IAO), the government's hi-tech paramilitary vampire-hunting unit, and Santiago—an ancient hunter tied to the feared Society of Leopold. Amanda Huddleston voices Bet of Night, a late-night radio host.

=== Plot ===
In the 1920s, Seattle's Camarilla is ruled by Princes Lou Graham and Rosalind Emmerson. The city is haunted by the "Rebar Killer", a murderer preying on both humans and Kindred. Rosalind and several members of Lou's court fall victim, and Fabien leads the investigation until the murders abruptly stop following the disappearance of his sire, Gideon Hall.

In December 2024, Phyre awakens from a century-long torpor. Blood-starved, the beast within takes over, and they rampage through the city, violating the Masquerade before regaining control. They discover a strange power-suppressing brand etched into their flesh, Fabien's voice in their mind, and learn the city's factions are vying for power following the murder of Prince JJ Campbell. Lou abdicated long ago after being plagued by visions, but retained influence through Campbell and his successor, Ryong Choi.

To atone for their Masquerade breach, Choi orders Phyre to stop Sheriff Benny Muldoon, who has been slaughtering Thinblood Anarchs. After Phyre succeeds, Choi names them the new Sheriff. Seeking answers about their brand, Phyre turns to Tremere researcher Safia Ulusoy for help. In their uneasy sleep, Phyre shares dreamlike visions with Fabien of sunlit fields of sunflowers and the cryptic words of a "Gardener". Phyre next confronts Toreador Primogen Ysabella Moore, who has been killing mortals and harvesting their blood. Before her destruction, Ysabella reveals she serves the Sabbat. Phyre then visits Willem, the court archivist. He attempts to enthrall Phyre, but fails, and his Sabbat masters remotely detonate the explosive vest he is wearing, killing him.

Fearing a Sabbat resurgence, Choi sends Phyre into Seattle's buried ruins to investigate a string of disappearances. Deep underground, Phyre encounters monstrous vampire-like creatures known as the Unbirthed, or "Moonflowers", and experiences another vision in which they meet the Gardener: a torpor-stricken Gideon. Gideon begs Phyre to consume him; instead, Phyre kills him. When Phyre awakens, Gideon's rebar-impaled body lies destroyed. Returning to the Camarilla's base in Weaver Tower, Phyre learns Lou's visions have ceased, and she has reclaimed her position as Prince. Fabien realizes that Lou and Campbell were the Rebar Killer, using the identity to eliminate Lou's enemies, including Gideon, and erasing Fabien's memories each time he uncovered the truth.

Safia later claims she has deciphered the brand's secret and asks to meet at the park conservatory. There, Phyre discovers a vast underground lab—where they were experimented on in their torpor and branded—alongside Safia's corpse and hordes of Unbirthed fed on Ysabella's collected blood. Lou uses Safia's death to justify sending Phyre after the Anarch leader, Katsumi Ishikazi, believing them to be Sabbat. Katsumi denies this, and the Anarch Damsel warns Phyre that the Sabbat framed the Anarchs as a distraction.

Phyre races back to Weaver Tower but is ambushed by Safia, who faked her death. After killing Choi with sunlight, Safia reveals she leads the Sabbat and seeks vengeance against Lou for murdering her lover, Gideon. Safia explains that Phyre was intended to awaken and consume Gideon, allowing his consciousness to overwrite theirs through the brand. However, Campbell and Fabien discovered Phyre first. Fabien deliberately awakened Phyre, knowing they would kill him and Campbell, thereby avenging Gideon but inadvertently binding Fabien's mind inside Phyre. Safia declares that she will use the Unbirthed to destroy the city and the Masquerade. Desperate, Fabien convinces Phyre to escape into the sunlight, sacrificing himself to protect them. After recovering, Phyre battles through Sabbat- and Unbirthed-infested streets, storms Weaver Tower, and kills Safia by drinking her blood, causing the brand to vanish.

Depending on the player's choices, the game ends with various characters reigning as the Prince, including Lou, the Anarchs, or Phyre, who can alternatively leave the city. The IAO can also purge the city of vampires.

==== Loose Cannon ====
In 2014, Benny hunts down a Sabbat cult that breaches the Masquerade and worships the mysterious Mr. Sunshine. He fights through their underground lair while receiving telepathic messages from Mr. Sunshine, revealing the negative opinions held about him by the city's key figures. After defeating his enforcer, Mr. Night, Benny confronts a statue of Mr. Sunshine, unaware it depicts Gideon. Mr. Sunshine shows Benny a vision of the future in which Katsumi and the Anarchs' protection of Thin-bloods leads to their integration into the Seattle court, weakening vampire society and ultimately causing a civil war before the survivors are purged by the IAO. He offers Benny the chance to avoid this future, inducting him into the Sabbat.

By December 2024, following Campbell's death, Benny has grown impatient with the Sabbat's inaction against Katsumi and the Anarchs. After destroying the statue of Mr. Sunshine and discovering Gideon's decayed true form, he abandons both the Sabbat and his role as Sheriff, and begins hunting Anarchs and Katsumi, believing their elimination will save the city. Although he defeats numerous Anarchs, he is ultimately staked by Damsel, leaving him in torpor until his revival and eventual defeat at the hands of Phyre.

==== The Flower & the Flame ====
In April 2020, Ysabella accepts Safia's invitation to join a conspiracy to destroy the Seattle court. The pact is sealed by drinking blood from the slumbering Nomad, binding Ysabella to the other conspirators through Safia's control of the ancient vampire.

By December 2024, Ysabella has grown frustrated with Safia's inaction and decides to enact her masterpiece now that the Nomad has been freed. She collects blood from the Moonflowers beneath the conservatory, magically charms several of Safia's Sabbat followers into assisting with her preparations, and enthralls citizens to attend the event at her Atrium club. At Atrium, Ysabella drinks Willem's blood to acquire the abilities granted to him by the Gardener, allowing her to enter a lucid dream state. There, she seeks to discover her true self and overcome her doubts, anxieties about her legacy, and past compromises. Guided by the disembodied voice of the Beast, she relives pivotal moments from her existence, including her failed acting career as a mortal and her replacement of Toreador primogen Dani Lucero, an icon of Seattle's 1990s music scene. Ultimately, Ysabella confronts the Beast, which takes her form, claims to be her truest self, and intends to take control of her physical body. Although she defeats it, manifestations of Safia and the other conspirators, empowered by their shared blood bond, declare that the decision over who controls her body is no longer hers to make. The outcome is left ambiguous. Upon awakening, Ysabella proceeds with her event at Atrium, announcing that the attendees will become art before spraying them with the Moonflower blood, transforming them into mind-controlled ghouls.

== Development ==
=== Background ===
The 2004 release of Vampire: The Masquerade – Bloodlines had been a relative failure, selling fewer than 100,000 copies when it was launched in competition against the highly-anticipated sequels Half-Life 2, Halo 2, and Metal Gear Solid 3: Snake Eater. Bloodlines was the last in a line of games developed by Troika Games that was critically well received but marred by technical issues and low sales, and Troika was shuttered shortly after its release, preventing them from developing a sequel. In 2004, then-director Leonard Boyarsky said that although the team would like to pursue a Bloodlines sequel, the decision belonged to then-publisher Activision. In the years following Bloodlines's release, the game became considered a cult classic.

Video game publisher Paradox Interactive purchased White Wolf in October 2015, obtaining the World of Darkness intellectual property, including Bloodlines. Following the purchase, Paradox CEO Fredrik Wester confirmed that a sequel was possible, stating "when the time is right I guess a sequel will find its place in the market."

=== Development under Hardsuit Labs ===
Shortly after Paradox Interactive's acquisition of White Wolf, Seattle-based developer Hardsuit Labs' creative director Ka'ai Cluney convinced co-founder Andy Kipling to pitch a Bloodlines sequel to Paradox, while Cluney made contact with Bloodlines writer Brian Mitsoda. A meeting was arranged soon after, and Mitsoda joined the sequel as narrative lead, bringing in Cara Ellison as senior writer. Producer Christian Schlütter said: "When we as Paradox acquired the IP, we saw Bloodlines as the crown jewel... then [Hardsuit Labs] come along and have the perfect pitch, with the original writer on-board too. It all happened far faster than we expected." The project's internal code name was "Project Frasier", a reference to the Seattle-based sitcom Frasier (1993–2004).

Under Hardsuit Labs, Bloodlines 2 was inspired by Seattle's identity crisis, caught between its cultural past and a corporate-driven future. Mitsoda and Ellison envisioned the game's factions as reflections of this tension, and aimed to move away from the original's "male power fantasy" by focusing on the emotional journey of becoming a vampire and the loss of one's former life. The story followed a fledgling thinblood turned during a rogue vampire attack, set around Christmas. Seattle was divided among five factions: the old-guard Pioneers, led by Prince Lou Grand; the elite and business-savvy Camarilla, led by Prince Alec Cross; the criminal underworld faction known as the Baron; the Tremere-led Newcomers, headed by Viktor Goga; and the secretive Nosferatu-exclusive Unseen, who relied on hackers and outcasts for intelligence.

Gameplay improvements included more meaningful skill use, correcting underutilised abilities like "Investigation" from the original, and reworked combat. Rather than relying on chance, attacks would always land but scale with player proficiency in melee or ranged combat. The game was set entirely at night, as a tested day-night cycle with sunlight hazards proved unfun. Hardsuit Labs also dropped third-person elements, opting for a first-person-only system inspired by the responsive combat in the action-adventure game Dishonored (2012). Development occurred alongside the fifth edition of the tabletop game, and shared mechanics like Resonances enhancing abilities.

Coinciding with the game's second publicly announced delay in July 2020, Mitsoda and Cluney were both terminated from their positions by the leaderships at Hardsuit Labs and Paradox Interactive; no explanation was given, although Mitsoda later described it as a "shock". Mitsoda said the situation as unexpected and disappointing, after working on the game for five years. Following this, Alexandre Mandryka took over the role of creative director. In October 2020, Paradox confirmed that Ellison had also left the project. Game designer Chris Avellone was initially involved as a writer for the game; however, after sexual assault allegations surfaced in June 2020, which were later retracted, Paradox Interactive removed his contributions.

In February 2021, Paradox Interactive announced that Hardsuit Labs no longer was working on the game, and that Paradox Interactive was collaborating with another developer to finish the production. Hardsuit Labs made their narrative team staff redundant shortly afterward. Paradox Interactive had prior to this considered cancelling the project, but received a pitch from The Chinese Room that convinced them to continue development.

=== Development under The Chinese Room ===
The Chinese Room (TCR) took over development shortly after the removal of Hardsuit Labs, although their involvement was not announced until September 2023. Paradox Interactive's deputy CEO Mattias Lilja explained that the drastic decision to change developers was the only way to save the project. Hardsuit Labs struggled with the game's scale, while TCR brought stability, confidence, and experience in delivering narrative-focused games with tight stories and settings.

TCR inherited the core vision from Hardsuit Labs but reshaped the project to fit their strengths. They retained the Seattle-during-Christmas setting—adding a severe snowstorm to the proceedings—and reusing much of Hardsuit Labs' art and level design. However, the game was rebuilt with a new codebase, as well as different gameplay mechanics and RPG systems. The number of available clans for the player to choose was also reduced from five (Tremere, Toreador, Ventrue, Malkavian, and Brujah) to four. TCR developed a design rule for non-combat gameplay, determining that it should involve things only a vampire can do, such as using enhanced senses for puzzle solving.

TCR initially explored summarised dialogue options for Bloodlines 2 to clarify player choices, but found this approach too reductive, as it removed the subtlety and nuance essential to characterisation and roleplay. Sarah Longthorne, Senior Narrative Designer, explained that the team ultimately adopted paraphrased speech, blending the strategic choice design of Bloodlines with more morally complex, layered dialogue. This meant that players would navigate conversations by selecting dialogue that reflects their intent—be it leveraging their power as an Elder vampire, flattering others, or provoking responses—without rigidly categorising options by tone or alignment. This system allows for varied and subjective interpretations of intent, leaving moral and strategic choices open-ended for players to define through their character's actions and words.

In 2025, Paradox revived its White Wolf brand to serve as the licensing and publishing company for its intellectual properties, including Vampire: The Masquerade. As a result, White Wolf also became co-publisher of Bloodlines 2 with Paradox. Despite the change in developer, the game was still subject to multiple delays. In August 2024, the game's release date was shifted to early 2025, ostensibly to add more endings to reflect more player agency, as well as adjusting certain characters, and implementing feedback from the Bloodlines community. In March 2025, TCR announced the game would be further delayed to October 2025, stating that development was complete, but they were working on its performance, stability, and technical fixes.

=== Writing ===
With TCR as developer, Hardsuit Labs' plot was fundamentally re-written. The mass embrace and thinblood protagonist was replaced by an Elder vampire who is awoken from centuries of slumber. Creative director Alex Skidmore said the aim was not to simply repeat Bloodlines' as a weaker and subservient character, but give players the opportunity to roleplay as a powerful, established vampire.

Narrative designer Arone Le Bray drew on experience from working on the role-playing games Mass Effect (2007) and Dragon Age: Origins (2009), as well as classic and contemporary RPGs. The creative team studied titles such as Baldur's Gate 3 (2023) to explore innovative narrative design, focusing on player agency, meaningful choices, and immersive storytelling. Le Bray emphasized the importance of making players feel ownership over their decisions, ensuring outcomes are clear but morally complex—encouraging debates over the "right" choice without misleading the player. TCR also reviewed the Vampire: The Masquerade tabletop game. Le Bray highlighted the tabletop game's moral framework, where players embody literal monsters—vampires wrestling with their humanity and the ever-present pull of the Beast. This struggle is reflected in Phyre, whose human past is so significantly distant from their present that it creates a sense of detachment and moral ambiguity.

Phyre is written as a vampire legend, present for various historic events. This idea emerged in the writing process, believing it was important to take advantage of the character's long life and status compared to the new vampire protagonist of Bloodlines. Senior Narrative Designer and Writer Sarah Longthorne said that Phyre is not a passive observer, they're a force that leaves a mark on history, and their reputation reflects that. In Seattle, different characters believe different things about Phyre. These stories do not change the world directly, but they influence how Phyre is treated. Unlike Bloodlines, Phyre cannot be defined at the start of the game, but is gradually shaped through choices made during the story, some more important than others, such as if they were a warrior, traveler, or a survivor during these historic periods. Similarly, when defining the background of Phyre's alternate name, the Nomad, did they travel the world out of curiosity, ambition, or to hide from something. Longthorne described shaping Phyre's history as reflecting the character's psychology, motivations, and adding emotional weight to determine if they will repeat old mistakes or break free the cycle.

Phyre is also fully voiced, where Bloodlines' protagonist uses unvoiced text options. Le Bray described the change as an effort to create a more immersive, focused experience—since Phyre has a more established background and status—instead of trying to cover all possible variations of a less defined character. He continued that instead of writing extensive text to convey the character's emotions, the voice actor can convey that feeling in their performance.

The character Fabien is written as an unreliable narrator; while he sincerely believes his statements, they may not always be accurate, leading players to question the trustworthiness of his guidance. The game's narrative team, led by Alex Skidmore and Ian Thomas, aimed to portray Malkavian perspectives as prophetic or insightful rather than fragmented, offering a more coherent and grounded viewpoint than that of the Malkavian protagonist in the original Bloodlines.

=== Design ===
The design team's goal was to create a version of Seattle that feels authentic to The World of Darkness—a city shaped by vampires, not humans. Rather than an exact replica, the game presents iconic locales of Seattle, condensing key landmarks like Pioneer Square and Volunteer Park. To present the city from a vampiric perspective, buildings were made taller, lights more intense, and shadows deeper, to create a heightened, predatory atmosphere. Fictional locations like Weaver Tower and seemingly mundane places, such as an all-night coffee shop, serve as hidden vampire hubs, reinforcing the Masquerade theme of vampires existing unseen within human society.

Seattle's districts are stylized through a heightened, vampiric lens, with exaggerated architecture and gritty environments echoing the noir feel of Bloodlines. Areas like Pioneer Square and Chinatown featuring unique lighting, mood, and environmental storytelling. Using a hybrid development workflow, the team combined modular kits and procedural tools to craft storytelling "dioramas" in each block, aiming to create an overall sense of distinct atmospheres in each segment. To encourage players to explore the city, the streets and alleys allow for unique encounters and feeding opportunities, while the rooftops allow the use of vampiric abilities without breaking the masquerade, but they are patrolled by Anarchs, adding a different danger. NPCs have different routines and interactions with each other independent of the player.

The design team crafted each clan's outfits to reflect their visual themes and complementary styles. For the Brujah, the designs draw on punk and rock culture inspired by their rebellious anti-establishment nature, based on durable materials like denim and leather, adorned with anarchic logos. The Tremere, with their roots in arcane magic, wear outfits that reflect a more antiquated, ritualistic style, blended with modern elements for practicality. Their garments are designed to allow freedom of movement for dramatic, magical gestures, while deep reds in clothing and jewelry evoke their mastery over blood magic. For the Banu Haqim, the design team leaned into stealth and subtlety with hoods, scarves, and multiple layers, creating sleek, shadowy outfits that allow them to blend into the night. The Ventrue, embodying wealth and authority, wear clothing that reflects their high status and refined tastes. Their outfits are opulent and regal, adorned with expensive jewelry and tailored to project confidence, power, and dominance.

Beyond style, the outfits were designed to appear practical, and the designers reviewed materials such as leather, fur, denim, silk, and cashmere, in creating the right aesthetic and realistic touch. The sound team additionally matched sound effects to each clan's outfit theme, so Banu Haqim movements sound quieter while Brujah make more noise.

The design of the introduction and ending sequences was inspired by the opening titles of television series True Detective (2014). "Moody" images of Seattle were combined with recognizable shapes and in-game elements to create a striking visual. Narrative director Ian Thomas and his team mapped out the nearly 40 possible endings for the concept team to storyboard and identify images that reflected the key themes and events of each ending. The pre-planning allowed them to identify common elements, allowing the reuse of images where applicable to save time. Associate art director Ben Matthews directed the concept team in creating a visual transition resembling blood undulating through water, prominently using red and black, with additional effects of snow, smoke, and blinking lights for visual depth. The final animation work was done by Atomhawk Design Ltd.

=== Music ===
Bloodlines composer Rik Schaffer returned to compose Bloodlines 2 under Hardsuit Labs. Once development moved to The Chinese Room, Schaffer was replaced by Craig Stuart Garfinkle and Eímear Noone. Schaffers compositions were not discarded, however, and were integrated into the score for Bloodlines 2, as a complement to Garfinkle's and Noone's original score; Schaffer's work appears in combat encounters, narrative moments, and exploration segments.

Garfinkle's and Noone's score was written to evoke a sense of timelessness and melancholy, while also highlighting contrasts and enhancing the game's nocturnal, moody atmosphere. As well as Schaffer's new compositions, they took inspiration from the original game as well as film soundtracks like Only Lovers Left Alive, Under the Skin (both 2013), the works of the Coen brothers, jazz music, and Gregorian chant.

The soundtrack of Bloodlines 2 combines modern and historical influences to reflect its contemporary setting and the ancient, complex lives of its vampire characters. The score draws heavily from film noir's harmonic language, using manipulated organic instruments such as guitars and cellos to create an unsettling, distorted soundscape. Various individual characters and factions also received distinct themes, incorporating elements such as Middle Eastern scales for Phyre, Balkan fiddle-inspired cello techniques, and industrial percussive sounds like shovels for specific enemy types. The use of slow, sensual rhythms, minor tonalities, and atmospheric vocals is designed to convey the seductive yet predatory nature of the vampires. Diegetic music also plays a role in Bloodlines 2, with in-world music systems implemented in locations such as the Glacier Hotel lobby, Makom Bar, and Atrium nightclub, where sound spatialisation reacts naturally to the game's environment. An original aria recorded with Irish soprano Celine Byrne also features in the game.

The official Bloodlines 2 theme song, "Midnight", is written by Michel Zitron, Paulina Palmgren, and Jarly.

=== Sound ===
The sound design was designed to adapt to the different environments, such as rooftops, alleys, streets, by dynamically analyzing geometry and context. Ambient sounds like wind, traffic, and reverb change based on the player's surroundings, supported by positional emitters such as creaking trees or voices from windows. Using Unreal's MassEntity framework, the game handles thousands of audio sources efficiently, with a system of "drivers and reactions" ensuring sound plays contextually based on proximity and object interaction. Footstep audio is dynamic, changing based on surface type, snow build-up, decals (like blood or leaves), water exposure, and terrain slopes.

Mixing focuses on contrast: quiet exploration is given ethereal audio treatment, while combat prioritizes impactful sounds like punches or gunfire, layered carefully to avoid overwhelming repetition. Voices are similarly positioned spatially, for example, Phyre's voice originates from a different spatial position than Fabian's.

== Release ==
=== Initial release plans ===
Bloodlines 2 was first teased in February 2019 with the release of a fake dating app, "Tender", created by Paradox and Alice & Smith. The app offered to use a "soulmate algorithm", matching them with sick people nearby based on the user's blood type. A Twitch livestream, and Paradox's official Twitter account also displayed a memo from fictional Tender CEO Malcolm Chandler noting the need to be prepared for 21 March 2019 in San Francisco, the date the game was publicly revealed. Initially scheduled for release in March 2020, the game was pushed back to an unspecified 2020 release date, and later delayed again to an unspecified 2021 release date.

=== Eventual release ===
Following the announcement of The Chinese Room taking over the project, the release of Bloodlines 2 was delayed beyond 2021, and experienced several further delays into 2025. Vampire: The Masquerade – Bloodlines 2 was released for PlayStation 5, Windows, and Xbox Series X/S on 21 October 2025.

=== Downloadable content ===
Bloodlines 2 was released with a base game and separate "Deluxe" and "Premium" editions that include additional content. The Deluxe Edition includes the "Santa Monica Memories" cosmetic pack, which features items inspired by the original Vampire: The Masquerade – Bloodlines. The Premium Edition initially included this pack as well as the "Shadows & Silk" add-on, which contained two additional playable clans: Lasombra and Toreador. The announcement that the two clans would be locked behind additional cost was met with criticism from both gaming publications and the fan community, an issue compounded by the game's multiple development delays. Fans expressed frustration that the Toreador clan, a significant part of the series' lore, was not included in the standard edition.

In response to the controversy, a representative from Paradox Interactive stated that the decision was a business-related one. They explained that adding the "highly sought after" clans required significant development time and resources, and that offering them as day-one DLC was a way to give fans immediate access rather than making them wait for a later update. Ian Thomas confirmed that the clans were added in response to fan feedback and that their incorporation contributed to the game's delayed release. GamesRadar+ and PC Gamer noted a key difference between this DLC and Paradox's typical expansion model for their sandbox games like Cities: Skylines (2015) and Crusader Kings III (2020). While new content for those games can be added at any time, clans in Bloodlines 2 function as character classes chosen at the beginning of the game and affect gameplay throughout, making the decision to purchase the additional content feel more immediate and essential for a single-player RPG. Following the backlash, it was announced that the Lasombra and Toreador clans would be included in the base game rather than sold as DLC. The game's executive producer, Marco Behrmann, credited community feedback for the reversal.

In addition, two post-launch story packs were announced—"Loose Cannon" and "The Flower & the Flame". "Loose Cannon" was released on April 27, 2026. It features vampire sheriff Benny Muldoon as a playable character in a story set before and during the events of Bloodlines 2. In addition to offering abilities distinct from Phyre's, it also adds Benny's outfit as a costume option for Phyre. "The Flower & the Flame" follows Primogen Ysabella Moore and was released on June 10, 2026. The DLCs were released as part of the Premium Edition or as separate purchases.

== Reception ==
=== Critical reception ===
Reception

Aggregate scores
Aggregator	Score
Metacritic	(PC) 62/100 (PS5) 63/100 (XSXS) 70/100
OpenCritic	26% recommend

Review scores
Publication	Score
Eurogamer	2/5
Game Informer	7/10
GameSpot	7/10
GamesRadar+	1.5/5
IGN	7/10
PC Gamer (US)	78/100
PCGamesN	5/10
Push Square	4/10
VideoGamer.com	6/10

Vampire: The Masquerade – Bloodlines 2 received "mixed or average" reviews from critics, according to review aggregator website Metacritic. Fellow review aggregator OpenCritic assessed that the game received weak approval, being recommended by only 26% of critics.

Robert Purchese from Eurogamer said that "The Chinese Room has managed to make something from a box of inherited parts, but this action RPG feels hollow and functional, and is only redeemed by some stellar performances from the characters and cast." Game Informer's Charles Harte concluded that the game "is a let-down, but not irredeemable. Despite a sparse open world and a story that's inflexible until the later hours, there's fun to be had here. Action and stealth gameplay help fulfill the vampire fantasy, and strong performances from the voice cast make the noir narrative one that I didn't mind revisiting each session." Writing for GameSpot, Jessica Cogswell praised the game's fun and compelling narrative that has full of drama and twists alongside an interesting and fully-realized main cast of characters but criticized it for its limited gameplay, narrow scope and the lack of customization, choice and consequence typically associated with RPGs alongside the many crashes, bizarre NPC behaviour and various technical issues that impacted a sense of polish during the overall gameplay experience.

Awarding the game 1.5 stars out of 5, Jasmine Gould-Wilson wrote on GamesRadar that "Vampire: The Masquerade – Bloodlines 2 is the definition of a crying shame. Clumsy writing and flat, repetitive world design expose a handful of good ideas that never take root, while its poor technical quality and unstable performance will render it unplayable for some. The result is a half-baked, blunt-toothed action-mystery hybrid that disappoints at almost every turn, struggling to leave even the ghost of a good impression." "Vampire: The Masquerade - Bloodlines 2 takes another flawed but unique and remarkable bite at the jugular, with plenty to love and loathe alike, but I certainly enjoyed my time as an elder vampire at the very least." was the conclusion of Leana Hafer's review for IGN.

Fraser Brown's review on PC Gamer was "A gripping story full of intrigue and murder that struggles to find its footing as an RPG sequel." Lauren Bergin for PCGamesN review summary was "Vampire: The Masquerade - Bloodlines 2 fails to recapture the original's magic, instead magnifying the worst parts of Troika's classic, with janky combat and occasionally woeful performance issues. Long-time VTM fans may enjoy haunting Seattle's snowy streets, getting to know its well-written cast, and testing each clan's unique playstyle, but it's a far cry from what it could have been." Robert Ramsey's conclusion on Push Square was "Vampire: The Masquerade - Bloodlines 2 is a shambles. Its best qualities are always short-lived, buried deep beneath the frustrations of non-existent RPG elements, extreme padding, and diabolical technical issues. Beyond the promise of its opening hours, this is a tragic misfire of a game."

Cat Bussell, writer for VideoGamer.com, said that "Despite well-written central characters that, at their best, radiate charm and intrigue, Vampire The Masquerade - Bloodlines 2 is an overstretched affair darkened by the shadows of its own limitations. Those looking for a well-realized vampire fantasy will find part of what they're looking for here. However, should they stray from the central story or look too closely at The Chinese Room's Seattle-by-night or the systems that underpin it, they will find themselves disappointed."

=== Sales ===
On 27 November 2025, Paradox announced that sales were significantly below expectations, resulting in an approximately $37 million write-down of development costs—indicating that the company no longer expects Bloodlines 2 to generate the level of revenue originally projected, and had therefore reduced its recorded value. According to GamesIndustry.biz, industry analytics firm GameDiscoverCo estimated that only around 121,500 copies of the game had been sold through the Steam platform, generating about $4 million in net revenue—the original Bloodlines generated $3.4 million on its debut, equivalent to $5.8 million in 2025. Former TCR creative director Dan Pinchbeck expected backlash against the game, saying that the team had urged Paradox to drop the Bloodlines 2 title to avoid setting audience expectations they could not meet, noting they lacked the time and funding to create a genuine mechanical successor to the original. The write-down had a significant impact on Paradox's financial results for the fourth quarter of 2025. The company reported an operating loss of approximately $28 million for the quarter, which it attributed primarily to the reduced valuation of Bloodlines 2. Wester described the outcome as a turning point for the company, prompting a reassessment of priorities and a renewed strategic focus on projects more closely aligned with Paradox's strengths.
