= Horse ebooks =

Spam Twitter account and accompanying Internet memes

The image used for the Horse_ebooks avatar

Horse_ebooks is a Twitter account and Internet phenomenon. Registered in 2010, the account was apparently intended to promote e-books but became known for its amusing non sequiturs in what seemed to be an effort to evade spam detection.

On September 24, 2013, it was revealed that the @Horse_ebooks account had been sold in 2011 in order to promote an alternate reality game developed for viral marketing towards a larger art project by the art collective Synydyne and the release of Bear Stearns Bravo, a series of interactive videos about the 2007 subprime mortgage financial crisis. The Twitter account has not been updated since.

== Content ==
Horse_ebooks was a part of a network of similar Twitter spam accounts which promoted e-books organized around a single theme. Based on investigations by Splitsider and Gawker, its creator was believed to be a Russian web developer and spammer named Alexei Kouznetsov (Russian: Алексей Кузнецов, also romanized Alexey Kuznetsov). Kouznetsov owned as many as 170 domains associated with similar efforts, some of which have been shut down or discontinued. Other accounts include companyebooks, action_ebooks and mystery_ebooks. Horse_ebooks tweeted fragments of modified text copied from other sources, mixed with occasional promotional links to websites selling e-books that were associated with the affiliate marketing company ClickBank. Examples include:

- "I will make certain you never buy knives again,"
- "We all agree, no one looks cool,"
- "Is the dance floor calling? No,"
- "Everything happens so much"
- "Unfortunately, as you probably already know, people"

Its output was described as "strangely poetic" and as "cryptic missives that read like Zen koans which have been dropped on a computer keyboard from a great height".

Unlike many other Twitter spam accounts, Horse_ebooks did not employ strategies of mass-following and unsolicited replies to Twitter users. Because it did not use typical spammer techniques, the account was not closed as Twitter spam accounts frequently are. Before the revelation in September 2013, it had more than 200,000 followers.

== Bakkila acquisition ==
On September 24, 2013, it was announced that Horse_ebooks had become part of a multi-year performance art piece staged by BuzzFeed employee Jacob Bakkila. Bakkila had approached Kuznetsov in 2011 with the intent of buying the account; Kuznetsov agreed, and since 2011, Horse_ebooks had been operated by Bakkila. This change was noticed by the account's followers when, on September 14, 2011, the account began tweeting "via web" instead of "via Horse ebooks", and the frequency of tweets promoting ClickBank significantly dropped while the number of "funny" tweets increased. Many followers speculated that either the spam algorithm had been changed, or that the account had been taken over by a different person, possibly a hacker who acquired the account's password. The same day Bakkila revealed the feed to be fake, he (as well as others who contributed to the project) performed at an art installation where fans could call in and have various horse_ebooks tweets read to them. After the announcement, Bakkila stopped tweeting on the account.

== Influence ==
Horse_ebooks has become the inspiration for fan art, fan fiction, and unofficial merchandise. Among these are T-shirts and Horse_eComics, a Tumblr blog by artist Burton Durand featuring comic strips inspired by the account.

Horse_ebooks was named one of the best Twitter feeds by UGO Networks in 2011 and Time.com in 2012. John Herrman at Splitsider wrote that Horse_ebooks "might be the best Twitter account that has ever existed." Writing for The Independent, Memphis Barker described Twitter as 'devastated' by the revelation that the account was human-run. After the fictitious nature of the account was revealed, The Atlantic named Horse_ebooks "the most successful piece of cyber fiction".

== Synydyne ==
Synydyne, an artist collective formed in 2006, is responsible for several performance art and alternate reality game projects. Synydyne is led by Internet artists Thomas Bender and Jacob Bakkila.

Synydyne's projects include Horse_ebooks, Bear Stearns Bravo, Pronunciation Book, and This is My Milwaukee.

In a 2015 interview, Bakkila explained the collective's approach: "Most of what Synydyne has created thus far is either designed to spread as quickly as possible—@Horse_ebooks and Pronunciation Book being the obvious examples—or to be as difficult as possible to access."

== See also ==
- dril
