= Strange Flesh =

2012 novel by Michael Olson

First edition

Strange Flesh is a novel by author Michael Olson, published by Simon & Schuster in 2012.

== Plot summary ==
The novel opens with a deceased programmer inside a device that has driven a hole saw through the back of her neck. We then meet the protagonist, a professional social engineer named James Pryce who works for Red Rook, a gray-hat security company. He attends a meeting at a giant media company, run by twins Blake and Blythe Randall.

James watches a mysterious video in which the Randall's half-brother Billy evidently electrocutes himself, but this turns out to be a ruse. Billy has "virtualized" himself in a virtual world known as "NOD" in order to communicate secretly with Blake.

The twins hire James to work undercover at a gamer colony called, GAME and there James uncovers other mysteries including a number of suicides among Billy's friends, known as "the Jackanapes".

It turns out that Billy has begun an ARG based in NOD at a replica of the castle from the Marquis de Sade's, The 120 Days of Sodom.

Finally, James penetrates a group working on a project they hope will usher in a whole new era of sensual technology.

== Characters ==
- James Pryce – A professional social engineer working for Red Rook security company.
- Blake Randall – A former fellow-student of Pryce's and one of the inheritors of the IMP media company.
- Blythe Randall – A former lover of Pryce's, Blake's twin sister, and inheritor to the IMP media company.
- Billy Randall – "Transgressive" artist and half-brother of Blake and Blythe.

== Major themes ==
The novel is set in 2015 and fits into the near-future sci-fi subgenre.

The story spends time explaining technological contraptions and could be called a "techno-thriller" but its most important theme is sex, specifically virtual sex, also known as teledildonics

== Reception ==
Reviews to the novel have been generally positive. Publishers' Weekly calls the novel a "head-spinning literary thriller... a rabbit hole of kinky cybersex and multilevel mystery." Booklist writes that author Olson "introduces “Imminent Teledildonics,” sexbots that employ next-gen virtual reality for revelatory virtual sex. Crimes, both high and low; bleeding-edge technology; and titillation: What’s not to love?" And Kirkus Reviews describes it as "A profane, heady thriller more startling and compelling than its individual components and influences might demonstrate."

== Publication details ==
2012, English, Simon & Schuster (ISBN 978-1-4516-2757-2), pub date April 3, 2012, hardcover
