= This Is My Milwaukee =

This is My Milwaukee was an alternate reality game created by Synydyne. Set in a fictionalized Milwaukee, Wisconsin, the game ran online in 2008 and 2009. On September 24, 2013, the related video was made private, coincident with the conclusion of Horse ebooks and Pronunciation Book as well as the beginning of the related Bear Stearns Bravo alternate reality game.

== Plot ==
The game involved the sinister Blackstar company creating a bioengineered creature known as Go.D.S.E.E.D., which was forced underground into dormancy and led to the city of Milwaukee being quarantined. A clock in the upper right of the website counted down to 17:00:00 UTC January 16, 2009. The numbers on the clock were replaced with the word “BO NU S?” after it reached 00:00:00.

Gameplay involved dead drops in New York Public Library and a cafe in San Francisco.
