= Picture the Impossible =

2009 alternate reality game

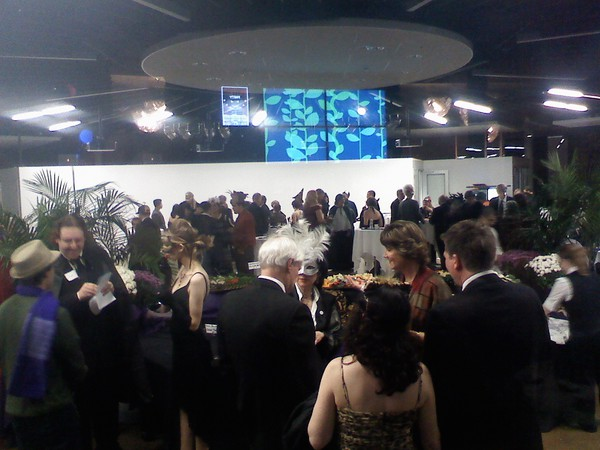
Photo of the Picture The Impossible gala held on October 31st, 2009.

Picture The Impossible was an alternate reality game developed jointly between the Lab for Social Computing at the Rochester Institute of Technology (RIT) and the Democrat and Chronicle newspaper. The community-based game allowed players to learn about and explore the city of Rochester, New York.

The game ran between September 12 and October 31, 2009, with approximately 2,500 participants. Players were split into three factions, each representing a different charity.

== Development ==
The game was developed by a collaborative design team led by Elizabeth Lawley from RIT and Traci Bauer from the Democrat and Chronicle newspaper.

== Factions ==
Picture The Impossible split participants into three factions:

- The Forge was associated with the charity Foodlink, and focused on solving puzzles and deciphering coded documents.
- The Watch was associated with the Wilson Commencement Park charity, and focused on decrypting the narrative and discovering in-game secrets.
- The Tree was associated with Golisano Children's Hospital and focused on solving puzzles.

== Gala ==
The Picture The Impossible gala was held on October 31, 2009, celebrating the top 150 point-scoring participants. There was a thirteen-way tie for first place between players who obtained every in-game achievement.

The staff who assisted with the game were also invited, including RIT's 9th President William W. Destler.
