= The company P =

Swedish media company

- Type: Production company
- Founded: 2006
- Headquarters: Sweden
- Key people: Christopher Sandberg (CEO/creative director, founder); Staffan Jonsson (managing director); Martin Ericsson (senior designer); Mike Pohjola (founder)
- Website: www.thecompanyp.com

The company P is a Swedish production company that creates participant based pervasive and transmedia entertainment. The company P is known for its Emmy Award-winning production The Truth About Marika and Emmy Award nominee The Conspiracy For Good. Marika is known as the first fully immersive TV tie-in.

== Television and transmedia credits ==
- The Truth About Marika (2007)
- Dollplay (2009)
- The Conspiracy For Good (2011)

== Dollplay ==
On February 9, 2009, Fox launched Dollplay, a participation drama centered on Dollhouse. As an interactive webisodes and forum, Dollplay is more content to the canons of the show, as well as a viral marketing campaign. The campaign asked users on the Fox Dollhouse website to "Save Hazel!" Hazel is a character trapped inside the Dollhouse in real-time. The campaign is called "Dollplay" according to the official FOX press release. Dollplay is created by The company P "a radical production outfit from Sweden". Five videos released in a four-hour span show Hazel entering a room, turning on the light, and messing with a computer. That's when the room locks her in and it starts to move. She approaches the camera and yells for help and the transmission cuts off.

On February 12, 2009, Fox opened the website up to further exploration, and interaction with the main character is now possible via Webcam. It is not yet clear how the character in the viral marketing campaign relates to the TV show Dollhouse, but both deal with science fiction and mind control.

On February 28, 2009, the Dollplay alternate-reality game ended with players saving the fictional Hazel. After Hazel is saved, she tells people that there are "Dollhouses" all over the world that imprint them and change them; these include schools, parents, religion and government. She essentially tells people to think for themselves and then leaves the container she is trapped in and the game ends.

== Awards and recognition ==
In 2007 The company P together with Swedish Television created The Truth About Marika that won an International Interactive Emmy Award for Best Interactive TV-service in April 2008.

In 2011 The Conspiracy For Good was nominated for an International Digital Emmy Award in the category Digital program: Fiction. In 2011 the project also won the Banff World Media Awards for Best Cross Platform and Best In Interactive. The Conspiracy For Good was also a South by Southwest Award finalist and Webby Award Honoree.
