= Nowheremen =

Fictional newspaper article: the first clue of the series.

Nowheremen is an alternate reality game and web video series that is centered on the fictional disappearance of Derek Francis Border. Players must solve interactive puzzles and treasure hunts across various mediums, including clues that are embedded within the video series. As users discover more about Derek's disappearance, the story becomes commentary about modern U.S. security efforts, recruiting techniques and the nature of modern surveillance.

Started in September 2007, clues were delivered to users approximately on a weekly basis. The series, however, did not premiere until January 22, 2008.

Though a title card for "X12 Productions" appears before the series trailer (released January 8, 2008), it is still unclear if there is a larger company or other interest behind the game.
