= Superstruct =

2009 alternate reality game

Superstruct is an alternate reality game (ARG) created for the purpose of calling attention to, and to spark interest in preparing the world for catastrophic events. Superstruct is the world's first massively multiplayer forecasting game. The primary creative vision behind Superstruct is Jane McGonigal, along with the Institute for the Future (IFTF) who have created similar games in line with Superstruct. The game was launched on Oct 6, 2008 and it lasted for 6 weeks.

== Gameplay ==
Superstruct combines elements of an alternate reality game with those of a serious game. Set in 2019, it stimulates the players to give humans a little more time on Earth after five "super-threats" that are wearing down our civilization. The five "super-threats" are: Quarantine, Ravenous, Outlaw Planet, Generation Exile and Power Struggle. The game leaves clues on the Internet in order for the players to find. This allows them to advance in the game and uncover more things about the game.
