= The Truth About Marika =

The Truth About Marika (Swedish title: Sanningen om Marika), is a transmedia production by Sveriges Television (SVT) and The company P in cooperation with SICS and Interactive Institute. It is an alternate reality game and a TV-series, created by Anders Weidemann, Martin Ericsson and Daniel Lägersten. The drama series, written by Weidemann, first aired in Sweden during the autumn of 2007. The Truth About Marika was marketed as a "participation drama" and had a high amount of viewer participation.

The viewers of the TV-series were invited by a young woman to participate in the search for her lost friend and the search took place online and all over Sweden.

== Participation drama ==
The Truth About Marika took place on television, national radio, the internet, mobile phones and in the streets. Each week the theories of the search for Marika were discussed in a live TV-debate. The events depicted on the television show was partially altered by the actions of participating viewers.

== Media platforms ==
The Truth About Marika narrative spanned across different channels aiming to provide an immersive experience into the story universe. It included: A TV drama, the Conspirare website, an SVT dedicated webpage, a debate television program, ARGs activities and Entropia Universe.

== Awards and recognition ==
The Truth About Marika won a SIME Award for Best Online Entertainment in November 2008

The Truth About Marika won an International Interactive Emmy Award for Best Interactive TV-service in April 2008.

The Truth About Marika was nominated for two Prix Europa 2008 in the categories TV Fiction and Emerging Media.

In 2008, The Truth About Marika also won an Association for International Broadcasting Media Excellence Award for Most Creative Specialist Genre with this jury motivation: “Many television companies are looking for ways to capture viewer loyalty before, during and after a program. With “based on a true story” marketing, The Truth About Marika saw its fan community overcome a series of complex trials in order to come face-to-face with “the mind-blowing truth”.

The Truth About Marika was nominated for two Prix Europa 2008 in the categories TV Fiction and Emerging Media.
