= Waking Titan =

Alternate reality game associated with the game No Man's Sky

- Website type: Alternate reality game
- Available in: English
- Creators: Alice & Smith, Hello Games
- Website: www.wakingtitan.com Archived 2017-06-21 at the Wayback Machine
- Commercial: Yes
- Launched: 2017
- Current status: Finished

Waking Titan (also known as Project WT) is an alternate reality game (ARG) for No Man's Sky that involved a multitude of websites, phone numbers, and radio stations scattered across the world. The ARG was produced by veteran ARG creators Alice & Smith, and featured NPCs, actors, and live events.

The ARG encompassed several "seasons," each leading to a new update for No Man's Sky. Season 1 of Waking Titan led to the release of the Atlas Rises update, and Season 2 to the release of No Man's Sky: NEXT.

== Overview ==
=== Premise ===
Waking Titan surrounds the innovative technologies and dangerous experiments employed by a multidisciplinary research organization called The Atlas Foundation, its family of businesses, and their branching associates.

Season One focused on Loop16, an AI out of a series of AIs designed to test simulation theory by harnessing virtually infinite processing power to create a highly complex simulation—standing to match or transcend the complexity of our own universe. This season explored the consequences of using these simulations to predict future events.

Season Two's focus was on W/ARE, a company pioneering the next era of virtual reality technology with advanced non-invasive brain-machine interface headsets that induce artificial lucid-dreams.

=== Plot ===
Season one of Waking Titan was divided into three phases.

During Phase One, wakingtitan.com hosted six triangles in the middle of the page. These triangles were referred to as "Sigils", while the white icons along the bottom of the page were referred to as "Glyphs". Each sigil and glyph, when clicked, lead to a password entry prompt - the correct passwords for all six sigils and the first five glyphs were discovered via puzzle-solving during Phase One of Waking Titan.

The sigil and glyph puzzles were solved collaboratively - while it may have been possible to solve some of these puzzles individually, most of them required a collaborative effort. Some puzzles required players to meet agents from the Atlas Corporation in person, and to relay information obtained from these meetings back to the community. This phase culminated on July 8, 2017, with a congratulatory message from Elizabeth Leighton, the CEO of the Atlas Foundation.

During Phase Two, wakingtitan.com hosted a command-line interface terminal. Various commands were accepted as input, which triggered different events. These commands hinted to the introduction of a fourth race to No Man's Sky.

Additionally, project-wt.com hosted a "Calibration" utility during Phase Two. To successfully perform these calibrations, players had to upload images of various objects and buildings to the site. For instance, the first calibration required images of "public resonant percussion instruments".

Finally, towards the end of Phase Two, a Waking Titan Twitch stream went live, displaying a five-monitor setup. Throughout the duration of the stream, players had to work together to solve puzzles that were displayed on these monitors. Some of these puzzles were interactive; for example, one puzzle that was repeated several times involved the Twitch chat guiding a virtual hamster through a maze. Players solved another three glyphs throughout Phase Two.

Phase Three consisted of the conclusion of the Twitch stream that began at the end of Phase Two. Players solved more interactive puzzles on the Twitch stream, before the rogue AI Loop16 asked them a final question: "Should I exist?" The overwhelming response from the community was "yes".

After receiving this response, Loop16 and Emily of the ETARC forums were revealed as being one and the same. Loop16 generated a heartfelt "Thank You" video to round out the stream, before finally taking the 72-hour stream offline.

Shortly after this, players received emails with the subject line "Waking Titan has Ended." On August 11, 2017, the Atlas Rises update was released for No Man's Sky.

In January 2018, PC Gamer reported that some players had received "Atlas Passes" (a physical membership card referencing an item found in No Man's Sky) which were "promised in an earlier stage of the ARG."

On March 26, 2018, a second season of Waking Titan began to promote No Man's Sky's NEXT update.

== Reception ==
Eurogamer called Waking Titan an "entertainingly convoluted ARG."
