= Transmedia storytelling =

Telling a single story across multiple platforms and formats

Transmedia storytelling (also known as transmedia narrative or multiplatform storytelling) is the technique of adapting a single story or story experience across multiple platforms and formats using current digital technologies.

From a production standpoint, transmedia storytelling involves creating material that engages an audience using various platforms and techniques—such as social media, film and television, educational tools, merchandising, and more—to permeate everyday life. To achieve this engagement, a transmedia production will develop and adapt stories across multiple forms of media in order to deliver unique pieces of material in each channel. Importantly, these pieces are not only linked together (overtly or subtly), but are in narrative synchronization with each other.

Transmedia storytelling often emphasizes audience engagement and medium-specific work, expanding the possibilities of narrative storytelling beyond the binary of original storytelling versus adaptation.

== History ==
Transmedia storytelling can be related to the concepts of semiotics and narratology. Semiotics is the "science of signs" and a discipline concerned with sense production and interpretation processes.

The origins of the approach to disperse the material across various commodities and media is traced to the Japanese marketing strategy of media mix, originated in the early 1960s. Some, however, have traced the roots to Pamela: Or, Virtue Rewarded (1740) written by Samuel Richardson and even suggest that they go back further to the roots of earliest literature.

Some works include, but are not limited to:

- Ong's Hat was most likely started sometime around 1993, and also included most of the aforementioned design principles. Ong's Hat also incorporated elements of legend tripping into its design, as chronicled in a scholarly work titled Legend-Tripping Online: Supernatural Folklore and the Search for Ong's Hat. ISBN 978-1628460612
- Dreadnot, an early example of an Alternate reality game (ARG) style project, was published on sfgate.com in 1996. It included working voice mail phone numbers for characters, clues in the source code, character email addresses, off-site websites, and real locations in San Francisco.
- Harry Potter, a best selling book series that spawned films, officially developed immersive fan sites, social media, video games, off-Broadway stage plays and spin-off films (Fantastic Beasts and Where to Find Them, Fantastic Beasts: The Crimes of Grindlewald, and Fantastic Beasts: The Secrets of Dumbledore)
- The Beatles
- Defiance, a television show and video game paired to tell connective and separate stories.

== Definition ==
The study of transmedia storytelling—a concept introduced by Henry Jenkins, author of the seminal book Convergence Culture—is an emerging subject. Because of the nature of new media and different platforms, varying authors have different understandings of it. Jenkins states the term "transmedia" means "across media" and may be applied to superficially similar, but different phenomena. In particular, the concept of "transmedia storytelling" should not be confused with traditional cross-platform, "transmedia" media franchises, or "media mixes".

One example that Jenkins gives is of the media conglomerate DC Comics. This organization releases comic books before the release of its related films so the audience understands a character's backstory. Much of transmedia storytelling is not based on singular characters or plot lines, but rather focuses on larger complex worlds where multiple characters and plot lines can be sustained for a longer period of time. In addition, Jenkins focused on how transmedia extends to attract larger audiences. For example, DC Comics releases coloring books to attract younger audience members. Sometimes, audience members can feel as though some transmedia storylines have left gaps in the plot line or character development, so they begin another extension of transmedia storytelling, such as fan fiction. Transmedia storytelling exists in the form of transmedia narratives, which Kalinov and Markova define as: "a multimedia product which communicates its narrative through a multitude of integrated media channels".

In his book, You’re Gonna Need a Bigger Story, Houston Howard describes transmedia storytelling as “the art of extending a story across multiple mediums and multiple platforms in a way that creates a better business model for creators and a better experience for the audience.”

In "Ball & Flint: transmedia in 90 seconds" (2013), Pont likens transmedia story-telling to "throwing a piece of flint at an old stone wall" and "delighting in the ricochet", making story something you can now "be hit by and cut by".

Shannon Emerson writes in the blog post "Great Examples of Multiplatform Storytelling" that transmedia storytelling can also be called multiplatform storytelling, transmedia narrative, and even cross-media seriality. She also cites Henry Jenkins as a leading scholar in this realm.

== Educational uses ==
Transmedia storytelling mimics daily life, making it a strong constructivist pedagogical tool for educational uses. The level of engagement offered by transmedia storytelling is essential to the Me or Millennial Generation as no single media satisfy curiosity. Schools have been slow to adopt the emergence of this new culture which shifts the spotlight of literacy from being one of individual expression to one of community. Whether we see it or not, Jenkins notes that we live in a globally connected world in which we use multiple platforms to connect and communicate. Using transmedia storytelling as a pedagogical tool, wherein students interact with platforms, such as Twitter, Facebook, Instagram, or Tumblr permits students' viewpoints, experiences, and resources to establish a shared collective intelligence that is enticing, engaging, and immersive, catching the millennial learners' attention, ensuring learners a stake in the experience. Transmedia storytelling offers the educator the ability to lead students to think critically, identify with the material and gain knowledge, offering valuable framework for the constructivist educational pedagogy that supports student centered learning. Transmedia storytelling allows for the interpretation of the story from the individual perspective, making way for personalized meaning-making - and in the case of fully participatory projects - allows participants to become co-creators of the story.

In "The Better Mousetrap: Brand Invention in a Media Democracy" (2012), Pont explains, "Transmedia thinking anchors itself to the world of story, the ambition principally being one of how you can 'bring story to life' in different places, in a non-linear fashion. The marketing of movies is the most obvious applications of thie concept. Transmedia maintains that there's a 'bigger picture opportunity' to punting a big picture to additional platforms. Transmedia theory, applied to a movie launch, is all about promoting the story, not the 'premiere date of a movie starring...' In an industry built on the conventions of 'stars sell movies', where their name sits above the film's title, transmedia thinking is anti-conventional and boldly purist."

Transmedia storytelling is also used by companies like Microsoft and Kimberly-Clark to train employees and managers.

Anders Gronstedt and Marc Ramos say "At the core of every training challenge is a good story waiting to be told. More and more, these stories are being told across a multitude of devices and screens, where they can reach learners more widely, and engage with them more deeply."

However, transmedia storytelling isn't used much at lower education levels. Children would thrive using transmedia storytelling worlds in their learning, but many of these worlds have copyrights linked to them. Transmedia storytelling has yet to tackle learning and educating children, but there have been a few transmedia worlds that have begun to show up with education, mostly by Disney.

Transmedia storytelling is apparent in comics, films, print media, radio, and now social media. The story is told different depending on the medium. With social media, the story is told differently depending on which social media platform someone uses (Twitter, Facebook, Instagram) The scale in which the impact each medium has differs from medium to medium. Before social media, radio and print media were the primary medium to connect with an audience. With the advancements in technology, social media has become the go-to medium to reach a large group of people in a fast amount of time. In the ideal form of TS, “each medium does what it does best — so that a story might be introduced in a film, expanded through television, novels, and comics, and its world might be explored and experienced through game play. Each franchise entry needs to be self-contained enough to enable autonomous consumption. That is, you don't need to have seen the film to enjoy the game and vice-versa.”

== Transmedia storytelling as a form of adaptation ==
There have been debates over whether works of transmedia storytelling and adaptive works should be considered part of the same field of study. Transmedia works often extend a narrative across various platforms while adaptive works retell or reshape a narrative. Scholar Erin Sullivan argues that the crux of this debate lies in the ambiguous terminology surrounding both transmedia and adaptation studies. Influential ideas associated with these fields have been introduced by scholars like Henry Jenkins, yet ongoing debates about the definitions of adaptation and transmedia storytelling continue to complicate their respective studies. Other scholars have found overlap between these fields in how they rely on fan engagement and are often the subjects of cultification.

According to author Lissette Lopez Szwydky, there is an assumed hierarchy between transmedia storytelling and adaptations. Transmedia storytelling often takes the form of less respected media forms—such as theme park attractions and fan fiction—while adaptive works typically manifest in more respected mediums such as television shows and films. In the case of certain franchises, like Star Wars, Dan Hassler-Forest argues that, in terms of this assumed hierarchy, "Film comes first. Current television and video productions are admitted into the 'premier league' of transmedia storytelling, but seemingly only somewhat begrudgingly....Comics, books, and other transmedia expansions are relegated to secondary or tertiary status—these are very much made to feel as if they are not the main event and are there for subgroups and niches of attendees who may be interested." With the emergence of new medias forms and the increasing use of hybridity in recent decades, the perceived hierarchy between adaptations and transmedia storytelling has become less pronounced; it is no longer rare for adaptations to take on the same forms traditionally associated with transmedia narratives.

Other scholars advocate for a more integrated approach to these two fields, arguing that adaptations and transmedia storytelling can be complementary processes. Transmedia storytelling has the ability to build upon adaptive works while also existing as its own entity. As with traditional adaptations, audiences do not necessarily need prior knowledge of the original source material to engage with a work of transmedia storytelling. This ability to retell or expand a story across various platforms positions transmedia storytelling as a mode of adaptation. In both practices, contextual and interpretive choices are shaped by the specific medium in which the story is told.

Transmedia narratives are also an intriguing form of adaptation because of their potential commerciality. Marie-Laure Ryan argues that transmedia storytelling is less about its narrative depth and more about its ability to function as "a marketing strategy that force-feeds storyworlds to the public through as many media platforms as available, in order to reach the widest possible audience." This commercial strategy mirrors long-standing trends in adaptation practices, where adaptations have often been driven by marketability.

Dedicated fans of franchises may be willing to follow a story from one media branch to another, no matter the cost. New consumers can also be introduced to a franchise exclusively through transmedia storytelling, much like how audiences can be introduced to stories via adaptations. In both cases, audiences engage with narratives that "resurface and recirculate, sometimes because they are being retold and sometimes because they are being extended in new directions" via new mediums, contexts, genres, expectations, and more—according to Henry Jenkins.
