= Ong's Hat =

Secret history conspiracy theory game

Ong's Hat is one of the earliest Internet-based secret history conspiracy theories. It was created as a piece of collaborative fiction by four core individuals, dating back to the 1980s, although the membership propagating the tale changed over time. The artist and author Joseph Matheny is regarded as the principal author. Ong's Hat is often cited as the first alternate reality game on many lists of ARGs.

The characters were largely based in the ghost town of Ong's Hat, New Jersey, hence the name of the project.

== History ==
The threads of the story can be traced back as far as the 1980s on bulletin board systems, and via mail art networks, early zines, and faxlore. As Joseph Matheny explains in an interview with the German tech and culture magazine 1E9, the aim was to create a ‘living book experiment’ and to tell a fictional story across multiple media formats and narrative styles. The initial form consisted of postal items and leaflets which were slipped, in a guerrilla-style manner, between the pages of books in libraries, into weekly newspapers, into vending machines or simply into letterboxes. The story eventually used print, radio, television and digital media (CD-ROM, DVD, Internet, BBS) in its dissemination.

The myth became known to a wide audience via the popular radio programme Coast to Coast in November 2000, in which Matheny was interviewed – posing as a reporter – about his research into Ong’s Hat.

The initial ground rules acknowledged the possibility that such an experiment could end up going down darker paths, and they specifically ruled out Ong's Hat being used for cult-like activity. Even though it is a fiction, the tale may be based on earlier works. According to Joseph Matheny, people were convinced of the truth of the myth right up until the early 2000s. He himself was therefore reportedly threatened and had experienced attempted break-ins at his home.

Joseph Matheny eventually concluded the project on 9 August 2001. GamesTM magazine wrote that "Ong’s Hat was more of an experiment in transmedia storytelling than what we would now consider to be an ARG but its DNA – the concept of telling a story across various platforms and new media – is evident in every alternate reality game that came after."

In 2002, Lego created an ARG for their line of toys for Canadian children's TV series Galidor: Defenders of the Outer Dimension that featured some elements of the Ong's Hat story.

== Plot ==
The Ong's Hat narrative is told in the form of conspiracy theories surrounding a group of renegade Princeton professors who had conducted quantum physics and chaos theory experiments to discover a new theory for dimensional travel using a device called "the egg", and were camped out in a parallel world. Their story is introduced through two documents, Incunabula: A Catalog of Rare Books, Manuscripts & Curiosa, Conspiracy Theory, Frontier Science & Alternative Worlds and Ong's Hat: Gateway to the Dimensions. According to Joseph Matheny, the story was inspired by Peter Lamborn Wilson’s 1988 zine Edge Detector, as well as the works of Robert Anton Wilson, the Church of the SubGenius and the Moorish Science Temple.

The story is said to begin in 1978 when a man named Wali Fard bought over 200 acres of forested land and set up an ashram. This ashram was built for seekers of spirituality, politics, tantra, and psychopharmacology. The ashram was a place for Princeton physicists, among other accredited scientists, to perform experiments involving interdimensional travel. It was rumored that they were trying to train the human mind to manipulate quantum physics and reality itself.

A device called The Egg was developed in the late 1980s by these scientists and physicists. This device was created as a variation of a sensory deprivation chamber, and it was used to help them determine when a wave becomes a particle. However, during a test one day, something unexpected happened: it disappeared. A young man who was inside the Egg when it disappeared explained that in the seven minutes the Egg was gone, he had traveled to another alternate dimension of the Earth. This other planet was exactly the same as Earth, but did not contain human life.

Throughout the years, they continued their experiments. However, when military efforts threatened the research being done by these physicists and scientists, they had to move their site somewhere else. Piece by piece, they moved their ashram to the other Earth. They left behind only the house where the gateway between worlds is held. The only time the people who live in the ashram return is when they need to restock supplies.

== See also ==
- Creepypasta
- The Blair Witch Project
- Church of the SubGenius
- lonelygirl15
- Fakelore
- SCP Foundation
- The Slender Man
