= Susan Bonds =

President and CEO of 42 Entertainment

Susan Bonds is the president and CEO of 42 Entertainment and Infinite Rabbit Holes, Pasadena-based companies that specialize in the creation and production of alternate reality games (ARGs)—participatory and massively immersive experiences that are typically tied to a commercial entertainment property. While at 42 Entertainment she has produced such notable ARGs as ilovebees (for Microsoft's launch of Halo 2), Dead Man's Tale (for Disney's Pirates of the Caribbean: Dead Man's Chest), Year Zero (for Nine Inch Nails), Why So Serious? (for Warner Bros.' The Dark Knight), and Flynn Lives (for Disney's Tron: Legacy). Two of these projects, Year Zero and Why So Serious?, were awarded a Cyber Grand Prix at the Cannes Lions, the world's largest international advertising festival.

== Career ==
Bonds began her career in 1980 as an industrial engineer at Walt Disney World in Florida. After seven years as a systems engineer at Lockheed's Advanced Development Projects, the famed Skunk Works then based in Burbank, she returned to Disney as a creative director at Walt Disney Imagineering, the company's design and development arm. Working as a senior show producer throughout most of the 1990s, she directed the design, development, and construction of major attractions and new ride systems. Her portfolio included such blockbuster attractions as the Indiana Jones Adventure at Disneyland and Alien Encounter and Mission: SPACE at Disney World. During her tenure at Disney she also produced the exterior of ABC's Times Square Studios, the home of Good Morning America. She left Disney after ten years to become Chief Design and Production Officer for Cyan Worlds, the company behind the top-selling PC games Myst and Riven.

In 2003, Bonds joined with Jordan Weisman, Sean Stewart, and Elan Lee, veterans of the pioneering ARG The Beast, in the launch of what was then called 4orty 2wo Entertainment. With Joe DiNunzio, also a former Imagineering executive, as president, the company created a number of successful ARGs, starting with ilovebees and continuing with Last Call Poker for Activision, Dead Man's Poker for Disney, and Vanishing Point for Microsoft's Windows Vista. In 2007, after DiNunzio left to form Fido Management and Weisman left to form Smith & Tinker, Bonds became CEO. The departure later that year of Stewart, Lee, and CTO Jim Stewartson to form Fourth Wall Studios, together with the 2006 merger of 42 Entertainment with 3 Pin Media, left Bonds in charge of a new creative team headed by Alex Lieu and Michael Borys of 3 Pin.

In early 2007, during this transition period, Bonds produced the Year Zero ARG for Nine Inch Nails, a work that was hailed by Rolling Stone as "the most innovative promotion scheme since the leaked sex tape." Although NIN's Trent Reznor, who had commissioned the project, insisted that the game was an extension of the album rather than a marketing attempt, it nonetheless was awarded a Cyber Grand Prix for digital marketing at the 2008 Cannes Lions.

CEO of Infinite Rabbit Holes(2022-current), a failed AR(augmented reality) company that used Kickstarter for support on their (Batman)Arkham inspired board game.

The project exceeded its goal by 1000% but failed many supporters by not delivering what the customers paid for. 

As of now she has refused to address or update anything on the situation.
