= Fourth Wall Studios =

American entertainment production company

- Industry: Entertainment
- Founded: 1 January 2007
- Founder: Elan Lee; Sean Stewart; Jim Stewartson
- Headquarters: United States

Fourth Wall Studios is an entertainment studio founded in 2007 by Jim Stewartson, Elan Lee and Sean Stewart. Fourth Wall develops a wide range of entertainment properties, delivered via web browsers, smartphones, game consoles, TVs, movie screens and in the physical world.

Dirty Work, the first full multi-platform television series developed by Fourth Wall for its proprietary RIDES platform and starring Mary Lynn Rajskub, Hank Harris and Jamie Clayton, debuted on April 30, 2012. In September 2012, Dirty Work won an Emmy Award for Outstanding Creative Achievement in Interactive Media – Original Interactive Television Programming. The studio has also released the original genre series DARK WALL which includes installments from Toby Wilkins, Maureen McHugh and Walter Robot, as well as the Post-apocalyptic series FLARE.

Stewartson, Lee and Stewart were founders of 42 Entertainment, where Stewartson was Chief Technology Officer and Lee was a Vice President of Design. The trio produced award-winning alternate reality game (ARG) content including I Love Bees for Halo 2 and Year Zero for Nine Inch Nails. In early 2011, Fourth Wall Studios finalized a $15 million round of financing from Los Angeles–based investor and Los Angeles Times and Los Angeles Lakers owner, Dr. Patrick Soon-Shiong.
