= Poetry for Neanderthals =

Word-guessing card game

- Publishers: Exploding Kittens
- Publication: June 2020; 6 years ago
- Genres: Guessing game; Dedicated deck card game
- Players: 2+
- Setup time: 5 minutes
- Playing time: 15-30 minutes
- Age range: 7+
- Website: explodingkittens.com/products/poetry-for-neanderthals

Related games
- Taboo; Celebrity

Poetry for Neanderthals is a guessing game with a dedicated deck where players guess terms with only single-syllable words as clues. It was released by Exploding Kittens in 2020, during the COVID-19 pandemic.

== History ==
Poetry for Neanderthals was developed by Exploding Kittens co-founders Elan Lee and Matt Inman. The original idea was brought by a group of Lee's friends, who suggested a game where you had to describe experiences like passing a driving test using only one-syllable words.

The game was released in June 2020 and marketed for families to play during the COVID-19 pandemic. Because of the design of the game, it is also able to be played by groups using video-conferencing software such as Zoom, which permitted the growth of the game while people faced lockdowns. Beta-testing families of the game enjoyed it enough that they avoided sending them back to the company. The pandemic also caused difficulties for the development of the game, especially in finding suitable manufacturers for its inflatable clubs, which would have normally been made in China. The game was originally sold exclusively in Target stores.

In April 2021, the marketing agency Distinctive Assets included Poetry for Neanderthals in the gift bags for the 93rd Academy Awards, which were given to the twenty-five nominees for the awards for best actor, best actress, and best director.

== Gameplay ==
External videos
- Official gameplay tutorials via YouTube
- Standard edition tutorial
- Not-safe-for-work edition tutorial

Poetry for Neanderthals is similar to other guessing games such as Taboo and Celebrity. It is intended for two or more players ages seven and up and takes an estimated fifteen minutes to play.

Players form two teams and sit around a table, arranged by alternating teams. When a player is named the Poet, a player next to them (from the other team) is named the Judge. The Poet draws a card with two terms on it: one worth a single point and the other worth three. They aim to have other members of their team guess the terms but can only use words with one syllable or that have already been guessed. The Judge holds the No! Stick, an inflatable club, and hits the Poet "gently(ish)" with it if the Poet uses any other words. The Poet may not use gestures, abbreviations, or other languages.

The Poet continues drawing cards until a three-minute timer for their turn runs out, and then a player on the other team begins their turn. After every person on both teams has taken three turns, the game ends.

=== Scoring ===
If a team correctly guesses a one-point word, they earn that point and the Poet can choose to continue with the three-point word. Players cannot score more than three points for a single card. If the Poet makes any mistakes according to the Judge, they lose the card, subtracting one point. The Poet can choose to skip a card, which also results in a loss of one point.

Two "slates" are used to track scoring throughout the game: the Poet Point Slate and the Team Point Slate. During a Poet's turn, they place cards on their Poet Point Slate in one of three sections depending on the scoring criteria: +3 points, +1 point, and -1 point. At the end of their turn, these cards are all moved to the appropriate locations on the Team Point Slate. After the game ends, teams total their points using the cards on their Team Point Slates, and the team with the highest overall point total wins. Ties are resolved by playing additional rounds of turns as needed.

== Other editions ==
In addition to the standard Poetry for Neanderthals game, Exploding Kittens has released other versions.

On May 24, 2022, Exploding Kittens announced a not-safe-for-work (NSFW) edition of Poetry for Neanderthals with 800 new clues that are intended for players ages 17+. The NSFW edition uses different graphics and designs in line with its adult theme, such as the inflatable club being renamed the Spank Stick, but gameplay functions the same as the standard edition.

Exploding Kittens also offers a "Grab & Game" edition of the game, which is intended to be travel-friendly and only contains sixty cards.
