= Exploding Kittens (TV series) =

American-Canadian adult animated television series

- Initial promotional poster with the release window
- Genre: Fantasy comedy; Slapstick
- Created by: Matthew Inman; Shane Kosakowski
- Based on: Exploding Kittens by Matthew Inman and Elan Lee
- Showrunners: Matthew Inman; Shane Kosakowski
- Voices of: Tom Ellis; Sasheer Zamata; Suzy Nakamura; Mark Proksch; Ally Maki; Kenny Yates
- Music by: Shirley Song; Jina Hyojin An
- Countries of origin: United States; Canada
- Original language: English
- No. of seasons: 1
- No. of episodes: 9

Production
- Executive producers: Shane Kosakowski; Matthew Inman; Elan Lee; Greg Daniels; Mike Judge; Dustin Davis; Peter Chernin; Jenno Topping
- Producer: Janet Dimon
- Editors: Lauren Hecht; Matt Steinauer
- Running time: 24–27 minutes
- Production companies: Chomp City; Bandera Entertainment; Chernin Entertainment; Netflix Animation Studios

Original release
- Network: Netflix
- Release: July 12, 2024

Exploding Kittens is an adult animated fantasy comedy television series created by Matthew Inman and Shane Kosakowski for Netflix. It is based on the tabletop card game of the same name, designed by Inman and Elan Lee. Inman and Kosakowski serve as showrunners and executive producers, alongside Lee, Greg Daniels, Mike Judge, Dustin Davis, Peter Chernin, and Jenno Topping. Produced by Chomp City, Jam Filled Entertainment, Bandera Entertainment, and Chernin Entertainment, the series features the voices of Tom Ellis, Sasheer Zamata, Suzy Nakamura, Mark Proksch, Ally Maki, and Kenny Yates in main roles.

The series premiered on Netflix on July 12, 2024, to an unfavorable reception from critics. In November 2025, Netflix reportedly canceled the series after one season.

== Premise ==
In this animated comedy series, God and the Devil are sent to Earth in the form of talking cats. God, voiced by Tom Ellis, must reconnect with humanity while navigating life as a house cat. Living with a dysfunctional family, he attempts to solve their problems and faces humorous challenges, all while engaging in slapstick antics. The show is based on the popular card game of the same name.

— Netflix

== Voice cast and characters ==
=== Main ===
- Tom Ellis as Godcat / God
- Sasheer Zamata as Devilcat / Beelzebub
- Suzy Nakamura as Abbie Higgins
- Mark Proksch as Marv Higgins
- Ally Maki as Greta Higgins
- Kenny Yates as Travis Higgins

=== Recurring ===
- David Gborie as Cherub Aslandeus
- Tom Kenny as Cherub Craig
- Betsy Sodaro as Aidan

Carlos Alazraqui, Jill Talley, Matthew Inman, Gary Anthony Williams, Eric Bauza, Nika Futterman, Cree Summer, and Lucky Yates provide addiitional voices.

== Episodes ==
No.	Title	Directed by	Written by	Original release date
1	"Pilot"	Eddie Rosas	Matthew Inman & Shane Kosakowski	July 12, 2024
After a series of incidents leave his apartment and a section of Heaven in ruin, God is sent to Earth to answer a family's prayer in an effort to repair his image. However, he is sent in the body of a cat so he can grow closer to the humans, the Higgins family, which also limits his magical powers. After a series of failed attempts to get the family to bond, God, now going by Godcat, shrinks the family so they can play a board game created by Marv, the nerdy patriarch of the Higgins family. The plan works and the Higgins grow closer, but Godcat is informed that he must stay on Earth longer to further repair his reputation. After being notified of this, Godcat spots a black cat in the family's yard that creates a pentagram made of fire.
2	"Tartar Recall"	Scott Bern	Matthew Inman & Shane Kosakowski	July 12, 2024
Feeling she is not evil enough, Hell's board of directors send Beelzebub to Earth in a cat's body, stealing the idea from Heaven, to create "hell on earth". During a fight with Godcat, Devilcat accidentally sends Aidan, a friend of Marv's son Travis, to Heck, a version of Hell for teenagers. Travis and his mother, Abbie, infiltrate Heck in order to save Aidan. Meanwhile, Marv is approached at work to create a presentation for the world's largest tarter sauce company and enlists the help of his daughter Greta in order to bond with her. Marv's plan backfires when Greta convinces the other workers to go on strike.
3	"Shane & Chugger's"	Eddie Rosas	Caitie Delaney	July 12, 2024
Due to his birthday falling on Christmas, Travis tries to convince his parents to throw him a half-birthday party. Godcat takes Travis out while Marv and Abbie prep for the party and brings along his two Cherub assistants, Aslandeus and Craig, in order to show them the wonders of Earth and they eventually end up at the entertainment restaurant Shane & Chugger's. Karen, the Higgins' neighbor and Devilcat's owner, notices the party and tries to shut it down.
4	"Emotions Are Hard"	Traci Honda	Noah Prestwich	July 12, 2024
Greta enters into a rocket-building contest at school sponsored by a billionaire but has trouble finding people at school to help her. Travis runs away from home after discovering that Abbie has been posing as his therapist in a video game, thinking she is using it to eavesdrop on him and control his life. Abbie then seeks help from Karen in order to become a better mom. Godcat and Devilcat enter into a wager over good vs. evil with Marv's soul at stake.
5	"No Regrets"	Scott Bern	Sierra Katow	July 12, 2024
6	"The Town with No Internet"	Traci Honda	Shawn Kenji Pearlman	July 12, 2024
7	"SeaWorld Is Hell"	Eddie Rosas	Maggie Gottlieb	July 12, 2024
8	"Let the Games Begin"	Traci Honda	Shane Kosakowski	July 12, 2024
9	"The Westminster Human Show"	Eddie Rosas	Matthew Inman & Shane Kosakowski	July 12, 2024

== Production ==
=== Development ===
In April 2022, it was announced that an animated television series was ordered by Netflix, with King of the Hill creators Mike Judge and Greg Daniels as executive producers, alongside Peter Chernin. Additional game mechanics and cards tied to the show will be added to the mobile game at a later date.

In November 2025, Netflix reportedly canceled the series after one season.

=== Casting ===
Alongside the series' announcement, Tom Ellis, Sasheer Zamata, Abraham Lim, Lucy Liu, Ally Maki, Betsy Sodaro, Tom Kenny, David Gborie and Mark Proksch, were cast as the ensemble cast. In May 2024, Suzy Nakamura and Kenny Yates joined the cast; but within the two-year span of the show's development, Liu and Lim dropped out from the project.

== Release ==
Exploding Kittens had its first look preview at the Annecy International Animation Film Festival on June 14, 2023. Originally planned for a release in late 2023, the series was delayed for a 2024 premiere. The series was released on July 12, 2024.

== Reception ==
Exploding Kittens
Aggregate scores
Source	Rating
Metacritic	54/100
Rotten Tomatoes	72%
Review scores
Source	Rating
The A.V. Club	C−
The Guardian	1/5 stars
IGN	4/10

On the review aggregator website Rotten Tomatoes, the series holds a 72% approval rating with an average rating of 5.0/10, based on 16 critic reviews. The website's critics consensus reads, "A battle between heaven and hell translated into daffy slapstick, Exploding Kittens won't blow viewers' minds but serves up some fun animated mayhem." On Metacritic, the series has a score of 54 out of 100, indicating "mixed or average reviews" based on 9 critic reviews.

Lucy Mangan, reviewing for The Guardian, gave the series one star, saying it was "carelessly made, infuriating and unfunny" and criticising the poor storyline. The A.V. Club's Isobel Lewis gives the series a C−, saying that the jokes are "the kind that lead to a small smile but rarely makes anyone laugh out loud" though there are "nuggets of comedy gold"; she criticises the writing as "tame" and "lack[ing] the bravery of other animated series". Chase Hutchinson, writing for IGN rated the series 4/10, saying that throughout the show "premises are stretched well beyond their breaking point, jokes land with tiresome thuds, and every cliffhanger feels like a forced attempt to get Netflix subscribers to keep the app open."

In the Los Angeles Times, Robert Lloyd notes that while the series is a "lesson ... that anything can amount to exploitable intellectual property", it is also "corny as... hell, but it's genuine corn". Angie Han in The Hollywood Reporter said the show's plot was "admirably zany" but that the comedy "[tended] to be obvious"; she concludes that "if you're looking for light humor, you could do worse".
