= Bears vs. Babies =

Card game

"Bears vs. Babies is a card game where you build handsome, incredible monsters who go to war with horrible, awful babies."
- Designers: Elan Lee
- Illustrators: Matthew Inman
- Publishers: The Oatmeal
- Publication: June 2017
- Genres: Card game
- Languages: English
- Players: 2-5
- Setup time: < 1 min
- Playing time: 20 min
- Age range: 7+
- Website: bearsvsbabies.com

Bears vs. Babies is a card game created by Elan Lee and Matthew Inman, who also created Exploding Kittens. Inman is also the founder of the website The Oatmeal.

== Gameplay ==
The deck consists of two types of cards: bears and babies. Bears are built; they come in the form of heads, torsos, arms and legs. The player can connect the cards where they fit to form an army of creatures in front of them. Babies are played immediately into the center of the table. They form a baby army, which must be stopped by the player's bearlike creatures. War is initiated by provoking the babies with a provoke card. The babies attack all of the players' creatures at once. The player wins or loses the round based on the strength of their creature compared to the strength of the baby horde. Strength is determined by the sum of points indicated on each card. The main strategy is to provoke the baby army before the player's opponents' creatures are strong enough to win. There are additional cards in the deck to help the player strengthen their army, or attack the others players' creatures. These cards consist of Hats, tools, and weapons. The winner is determined by the player that has the highest point total of (b)eaten babies.

== Background ==
Although it is the second game released by Lee and Inman, Bears vs Babies's earliest stages date back to 2012. Lee told VentureBeat in an October 2016 interview that they began working on the game together within two weeks of the initial shipments of Exploding Kittens.

== Kickstarter ==
Proposed as a Kickstarter project seeking US$10,000 in crowdfunding, it far exceeded the goal within the first day of the campaign, eventually raising $3,215,679 making it the 10th most funded board game on Kickstarter of all time. The campaign ran from October 18, 2016, until November 17, 2016, and was more than 25,643% funded with over 68,000 backers on November 15, 2016, at 1 PM CET.

Delivery of games to backers began in June 2017.
