= Elan Lee =

American game designer (born 1975)

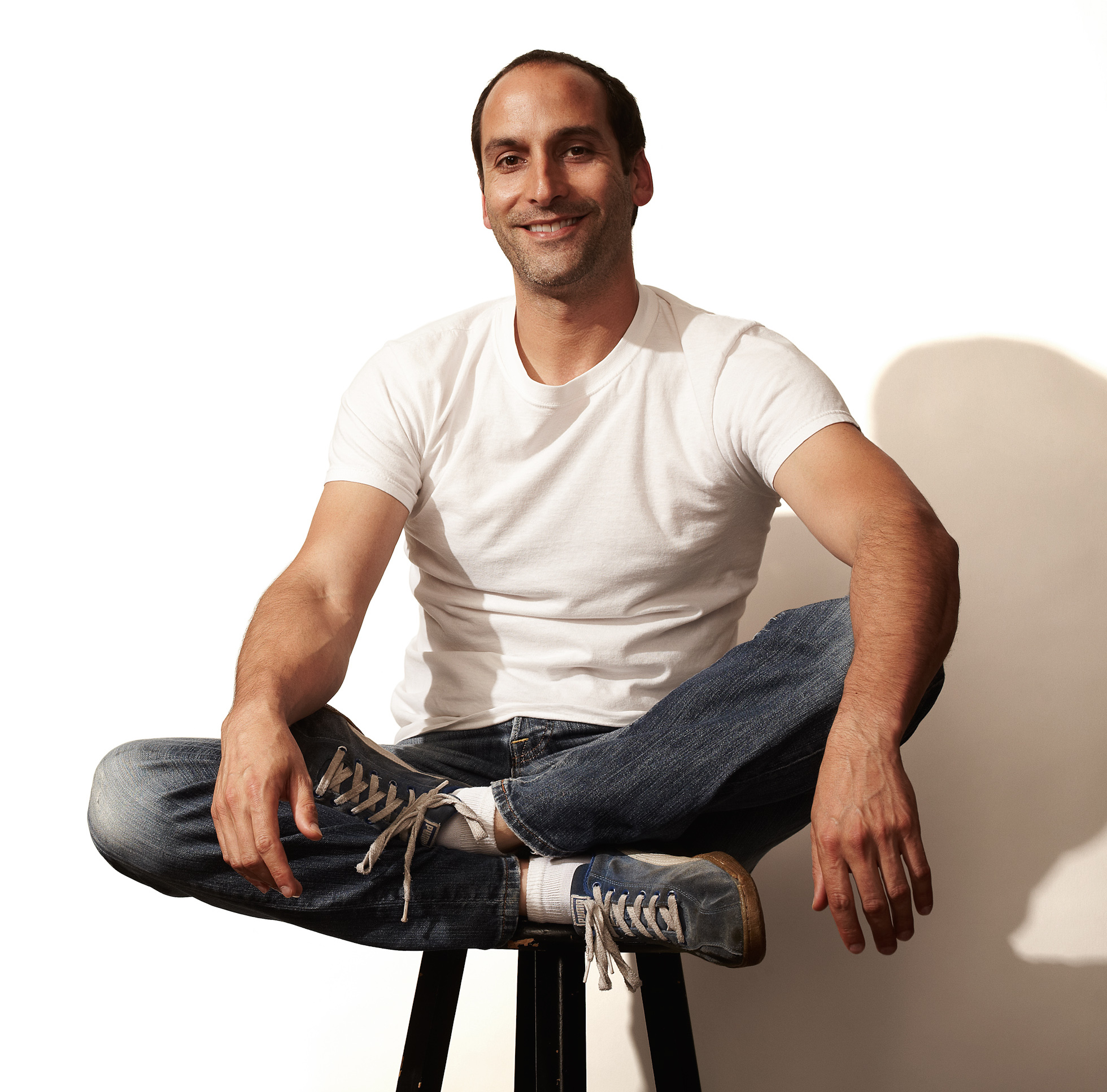
- Game designer
- Born: January 26, 1975 (age 51); Los Angeles, California, U.S.
- Education: Rochester Institute of Technology
- Occupation: Game Designer
- Spouse: Ramona Pringle

Elan Lee (born January 26, 1975) is an American game designer, developer, and creator. He has designed games for the Xbox; helped create the world’s first Alternate Reality Games; and with Matthew Inman created the card game Exploding Kittens, whose Kickstarter campaign was the most-backed of its day. He and Inman founded the Exploding Kittens company in 2015.

== Biography ==
Lee began his career as a character designer at Industrial Light and Magic, where he worked on several movies, including the computer special effects for Star Wars: Episode I – The Phantom Menace. Lee was then hired by Microsoft Game Studios as Lead Game Designer, designing and directing games for PC and Xbox. While working for Microsoft, he was the Executive Producer and Lead Designer for The Beast, one of the world’s first Alternate Reality Games (ARGs) used to promoted the Steven Spielberg film A.I. Artificial Intelligence.

Lee has co-founded several gaming start-ups. In 2003, he co-founded 42 Entertainment, whose alternate reality games include I Love Bees to promote the Xbox game Halo 2 and Year Zero to promote the Nine Inch Nails album Year Zero. He, Shane Small, and Dawne Weisman later co-founded EDOC Laundry to produce ARGs using clothes as the primary platform. Consumers deciphered codes hidden within garments and entered the results into the game's main website to reveal pieces of a distributed story. EDOC laundry is the world's first interactive apparel line.

In 2007, Lee founded Fourth Wall Studios to create entertainment experiences. Lee developed a new form of interactive programming that engaged audiences across multiple platforms via new technology he created. Projects such as the Emmy Award-winning series “Dirty Work” brought viewers into the show with interactive elements such as “integrated phone calls, texts and emails” as part of the viewing experience.

In addition to his work in interactive media, Lee helped create one of YouTube's most viral videos, Where the Hell is Matt?. He traveled the world with Matt Harding, serving as the cameraman for a video that became the second-most popular on YouTube at the time, cementing its place in internet history. This project not only provided Lee with valuable experience in social media and viral content creation, but it also led to his introduction to Matthew Inman, with whom he would later co-found the popular card game Exploding Kittens.

Lee returned to Microsoft as the Chief Design Officer for Xbox Entertainment Studios soon after the launch of the Xbox One game console in 2013.

By 2014, Lee had left Microsoft to build a new technology-based TV studio; he raised about $5 million, assembled a team, and built a prototype.

== Exploding Kittens ==
In 2015, Lee, Matthew Inman (The Oatmeal), and Shane Small created the card game Exploding Kittens. Originally called Bomb Squad, it became the most-backed campaign on Kickstarter at the time, raising $8.78 million from 219,382 backers. “When Exploding Kittens launched, I thought it would be a side project on the weekend. It’s so weird when the side project dwarfs the scope and scale of the main project. And so I decided to return the money I raised [$5 million for the "main" project, a "technology-based TV studio"]. I realized that if I didn’t turn all my attention to this, it would become the biggest regret of my life.”

Later in the year, Lee and Inman founded Exploding Kittens Inc. The company released its second tabletop game, Bears vs. Babies, in 2017, after raising more than $3 million from 85,000 Kickstarter backers.

In 2018, the company released You’ve Got Crabs; in 2019, it released Throw Throw Burrito after another Kickstarter campaign and On a Scale of One to T-Rex exclusively on Amazon.

In October 2019, the American businessman and investor Peter Chernin, CEO of The Chernin Group, invested $30 million for a minority stake in Exploding Kittens Inc. Inman said the company planned to use the funds to mount a live gaming convention, Burning Cat, inspired by the Burning Man festival; hire more artists; and produce three and five new games a year.

== Credits ==
With Microsoft:

- The Beast: Lead Designer (2001)

With 42 Entertainment:

- I Love Bees Lead Designer (2004)
- Last Call Poker Lead Designer (2005)
- The Vanishing Point Lead Designer (2007)
- Year Zero Designer (2007)

== Acclaim ==
Lee and his projects have won several industry awards for both design and marketing.

In 2005, I Love Bees won an Innovation Award from IGDA, and a Webby Award.

In 2008, Year Zero won the Cannes Lions International Festival of Creativity Grand Prix Award for "Viral Marketing" and a Silver Award for "Integrated Campaign". The game also won a bronze Clio Award, and two Webbys: Peoples Voice Award (Branded Content) and Peoples Voice Award (Integrated Campaigns).

In 2012, Lee won a Creative Arts Emmy for Original Interactive Programming for the web series Dirty Work. The same year he won the Trailblazer Award from IndieCade.

In March 2022, The Beast received a Legacy Peabody Award for Interactive Journalism.
