= Perfect Circle =

Perfect Circle can refer to:

- A type of circle
- The Perfect Circle, a 1997 movie by Bosnian director Ademir Kenovic.
- Perfect Circle (novel), 2004 novel by Sean Stewart
- Perfect Circle (song), song from R.E.M.'s debut album Murmur
- A Perfect Circle, rock band
- The Perfect Circle Company, former U.S. manufacturer of piston rings, now part of Mahle GmbH
