= Cathy's Key =

Book by Sean Stewart and Jordan Weisman

- First edition (publ. Running Press Kids)
- Author: Sean Stewart, Jordan Weisman
- Language: English
- Publication date: 2008

Cathy's Key (2008) is a novel continuing the storyline established in the first part of its series, Cathy's Book (2006). The story is written by Sean Stewart and Jordan Weisman, and illustrated by Cathy Briggs.

As did its predecessor, the book takes the form of a 216-page journal written by the protagonist, Cathy Vickers. The book immediately picks up after book one of the series concludes, and follows Cathy in her quest to discover more about the mysterious and dangerous world of the immortals. Although many of the same characters (Emma, Cathy's best friend, and Victor, Cathy's boyfriend) are involved in the plot, there are also new characters introduced that complicate the storyline. For instance, a stranger met on a bus trip has developed by the end of the book into a major character, and new relatives such as Tsao, Victor's father, appear in surprising and sometimes disturbing ways. At its most basic level, the plot involves Cathy attempting to navigate the treacherous world that the immortals inhabit while not imperiling herself or those she loves. Although high school graduation has come and passed and Cathy still doesn't have a job, she manages to keep busy by avoiding lovestruck immortals, trying to help her boyfriend discover the key to immortality, and in her free time delving into the mystery surrounding her father's death. Although the story ends in another dramatic cliffhanger that leaves much to be resolved, Cathy's saga continues in the third installation of the series, Cathy's Ring (2010).

== Form ==
Cathy’s Key follows the tradition established by its predecessor in presenting the story in a radically innovative way. Similar to a graphic novel, the text of the story is accompanied by hand-drawn images (created by illustrator Cathy Briggs), yet Cathy’s Key also contains a cache of objects that are related to the plot. For instance, the “evidence package” in Cathy’s Book contains artifacts such as a wedding invitation, a menu from a restaurant, various letters, a napkin, a death certificate, and four pieces of a ripped photo, among other items.

== Scholarly criticism ==
The scholarly criticism for the text has tended to focus on its unique form and the opportunities that presents. For instance, Motoko Rich wrote an article in The New York Times entitled “Product Placement Deals Make Leap From Film to Books” (2006) that discussed how Stewart had incorporated a lip gloss made by Cover Girl in exchange for free advertising on their online website. Other writers view such a relationship as overly commercialized and effectively commodifying literature, and have written about the effect that this may have on impressionable teen readers and teen writers. Still more critics have positively focused on the text as adapting digital age characteristics to remain relevant in an increasingly technology-centered age. The term “dynamic hybrid” was coined to describe Stewart's multimedia (phone numbers, web addresses etc.) approach to literature, while other scholars see the possibility for the text to become associated with gaming networks. Indeed, some even go so far as to classify the work as an ARG, or alternate reality game.

== Book reviews ==
The reviews for Cathy’s Key praise the spunkiness of the heroine and its multi-media impact. However, a few readers critiqued the work as having a plot that sometimes seemed disorganized and hard to follow. The book is especially recommended for fans of manga, gaming followers, and reluctant readers, and is categorized within the YA or young adult section of libraries.
