= Alex Xia-Song =

Stand-up comedian, writer, actor and improviser

Alex Xia Song is a stand-up comedian, writer, actor and improviser. She has written for The Tonight Show With Jimmy Fallon, HBO's Night of Too Many Stars, Exploding Kittens and Rick and Morty. In 2024, Song wrote and directed the short, Really Good Driver, which debuted at the HollyShorts Film Festival.

== Career ==
Started doing improv in college.
