= Steve Peters =

Steve Peters may refer to:

- Steve Peters (Ontario politician) (born 1963), politician in Ontario, Canada
- Steve Peters (Manitoba politician) (1912–1976), politician in Manitoba, Canada
- Steve Peters (game designer) (born 1961)
- Steve Peters (baseball) (born 1962), Major League Baseball pitcher
- Steve Peters (ice hockey) (born 1960), Canadian ice hockey forward
- Steve Peters (psychiatrist), English sports psychiatrist

== See also ==
- Stephen Peters (born 1978), cricketer
- Stephen Peters, screenwriter of Wild Things
