= Talia Castellano =

American internet celebrity

Talia Joy Castellano
- Castellano with her custom-made magazine cover, first shown on Ellen
- Born: August 18, 1999; Orlando, Florida, U.S.
- Died: July 16, 2013 (aged 13); Orlando, Florida, U.S.
- Cause of death: Neuroblastoma
- Resting place: Ohev Shalom Cemetery

YouTube information
- Channel: taliajoy18
- Years active: 2011–2013
- Genre: Makeup tutorials
- Subscribers: 1.42 million
- Views: 96.2 million

Talia Joy Castellano (August 18, 1999 – July 16, 2013) was an American internet personality and model who was best known for her work on YouTube, notably her makeup and fashion content, and for becoming the first honorary CoverGirl in 2012. She battled the diseases neuroblastoma and leukemia for six years, and died on July 16, 2013. As of May 2021, her YouTube channel has received over a million subscribers.

== Early life and illness ==
Castellano was born on August 18, 1999, in Orlando, Florida, and grew up in and around central Florida with her mother, Desiree Castellano, and in New York City with her father, Marc Winthrop. She had three siblings: Kaitlyn, Jackson Winthrop, and Mattia Castellano. When she was 7 years old, Castellano began experiencing fevers and abdominal pain. When an X-ray on February 14, 2007 showed unusual anatomical displacements in her chest, she was diagnosed with neuroblastoma, a rare pediatric cancer of the peripheral nervous system.

Castellano underwent various types of therapies and treatments and was initially declared cancer-free, but relapsed three times in the next six years. During that time she was diagnosed with myelodysplastic syndrome (previously known as preleukemia) and progressive neuroblastoma; there are no known treatments to tackle both cancers at the same time. When Castellano became aware that her cancer was terminal, she opted to sign hospital forms requesting only palliative care.

== Career and activism ==
When first diagnosed with her illnesses, Castellano bonded with family friend Tammy DeLaRosa, who was also a cancer survivor. Delarosa taught her how to use makeup. On August 27, 2011, she uploaded her first makeup tutorial, "Crazy eyeliner" to YouTube where it gained over 30,000 views. Subsequently, Castellano, along with her father, Marc Winthrop, co-founded a charity, Band of Parents, focused on her wish to find a cure for neuroblastoma. This organization became one of the supporters of neuroblastoma research at Memorial Sloan-Kettering Cancer Center.

In September 2012, she appeared on The Ellen DeGeneres Show, and was announced as a face for CoverGirl cosmetics. She appeared in CoverGirl magazine ads with her slogan "Makeup is my wig". She also collaborated with the Orlando-based BASE Camp Children's Cancer Foundation, a program to give support to children battling cancer in the central Florida area and to their families. She has stated in videos that she was not afraid of dying, and that "when it's my turn to go, that will be my turn to go."

The YouTube Rewind of 2013 was dedicated to Castellano. At the end of the video, the words, "For Talia Joy, who still inspires us" are handwritten.

== Death ==
Castellano died at the Arnold Palmer Hospital for Children in Orlando, Florida, on July 16, 2013 at the age of 13, after spending the last three months of her life in palliative care. After years of grueling treatment and with the disease metastasized, she declined any further proactive treatment. An announcement was made soon after the time of Castellano's death, on the Angels For Talia Facebook page.

On July 16, 2013, the day Castellano died, a video was posted on her YouTube channel by her older sister Mattia, who explained how she wanted some of Castellano's old friends to help carry out Talia's legacy, by completing the 13-year-old's bucket list. She also stated her determination to create a makeup line for Talia, and a clothing line, which never carried through. Back at the time of her death, friends and family of Castellano posted pictures of things she wanted to do as part of her bucket list, such as getting a tattoo and having "a huge water balloon fight." Castellano's YouTube channel and Twitter are now controlled by her elder sister and mother, with occasional updates, videos, and promotions.
