= BeingGirl =

Website

BeingGirl.com
- Website type: Inbound marketing, Self care
- Owner: Procter & Gamble
- Website: https://www.youtube.com/channel/UCHmU6DmIfL_gX9arzNh3iOg
- Commercial: Yes
- Registration: Optional
- Launched: July 2000; 26 years ago
- Current status: Unknown

BeingGirl was a "kid-friendly" web site targeted at adolescent girls created in 2000 by consumer goods company Procter & Gamble (P&G).

It provided information and advice; it was also a marketing tool.

== History ==
The site was created in 2000, with P&G including content provided by experts. Its development was led by the company's Tampax brand and feminine care group. Forums were later added, in order to build interest. This enables girls to discuss things with each other, facilitating more subtle and effective marketing by the company. Company representatives "play an active role" in this user-generated content.

As of 2006, the website was available in 25 countries. Its content editor in 2005 was author Marcia Byalick.

== Features ==
The site provides information and expert advice on topical self-care issues such as menstruation, eating disorders, acne and dating, by taking a "big-sister approach". Features such as self-discovery quizzes are also included. It also advertises some of the company's products and has offered free samples from Always and Tampax. The information is provided using "cool teenage-girl vocabulary".

In addition to offering advice, the site gathers information from questions asked anonymously by visitors. This is used for inbound internet marketing of its products, being judged by co-author of social technologies book Groundswell, Josh Bernoff, as being four times as cost-effective as advertising. The site facilitates data collection and market testing. Sociologist Adam Arvidsson, writing in 2006, analysed the site's premise as being that "engagement in community-like interaction will generate emotional and experiential ties" in consumers. They will consequently relate positively to the brand, which will raise the brand's equity.

== Marketing agreements ==
The authors and publishers of 2006 novel Cathy's Book agreed with P&G to include references to the CoverGirl makeup line in exchange for promoting the book on BeingGirl. No monetary payment was involved. The references were deleted in the novel's paperback edition. Also in 2006, Sony BMG partnered with P&G to feature its artists on the site. David G. Knox, a teenage market specialist in P&G's beauty division said that they approached Sony in order for teens to associate their brands with stars such as singer-songwriter Teddy Geiger.

== Reception ==
It's a safe place where they can go for information about changes they are experiencing but are too embarrassed to discuss.

— Velvet Gogol Bennett, P&G's North America feminine care external relations manager (January 2011)

The Taiwan site attracted 6000 registered members in the three months since launch in 2002. As of 2010, it was receiving in excess of 2 million hits worldwide per month. Its "successful engagement of teen girls" has been largely attributed to the company "stay[ing] in the background". Its Indian site was launched in 2006, which Nikhil Pahwa on the contentsutra blog observed to "lack the freedom of a social networking space", such as Hindustan Unilever's Sunsilk Gang of Girls. Writing in 2006, Sheth and Sisodia noted that the open discussion (in real life) by teenage girls of feminine hygiene products may be difficult in some countries.

In 2011, the charity Mothers' Union criticised the site for being "clearly a marketing tool" and Rebecca Morgan of the London Feminist Network linked references to hair removal and erotic underwear with the sexualisation of childhood. Research fellow at the University of York, Dr Merran Toerien, criticised the site's attitude in advertising to such a young age group.

Some reviewers evaluated the health content as being "useful and well presented", although concern was expressed about the number of product mentions. Some of the weight-loss tips were seen by some as "enabling eating-disorder behavior".

A P&G spokeswoman said that the site's "broader personal wellbeing educational scheme was strongly supported by schools".
