= Pumpkin (film) =

2002 film by Anthony Abrams and Adam Larson Broder

- Theatrical release poster
- Directed by: Anthony Abrams; Adam Larson Broder
- Written by: Adam Larson Broder
- Produced by: Karen Barber; Albert Berger; Christina Ricci; Andrea Sperling; Ron Yerxa
- Starring: Christina Ricci; Hank Harris; Brenda Blethyn; Dominique Swain; Marisa Coughlan; Sam Ball
- Cinematography: Tim Suhrstedt
- Edited by: Richard Halsey; Sloane Klevin
- Music by: John Ottman
- Production companies: United Artists; American Zoetrope
- Distributed by: MGM Distribution Co.
- Release date: June 28, 2002
- Running time: 117 minutes
- Country: United States
- Language: English
- Box office: $308,552

Pumpkin is a 2002 satirical dark romantic comedy film directed by Anthony Abrams and Adam Larson Broder and written by Broder. It is a story of forbidden love between a young man with a developmental disability and a sorority girl. It stars Christina Ricci (who also co-produced the movie) and Hank Harris.

== Plot ==
Carolyn McDuffy is a college senior at a Southern California State University and is part of the sorority AO Pi, led by senior Julie Thurber. To win an award that has eluded them, the sorority sisters begin training a group of handicapped young adults for the Challenged games (a fictional version of the Special Olympics). Carolyn is paired with Jesse "Pumpkin" Romanoff, and is horrified as she has never been around challenged people. He is kind to her and she begins to feel affection towards him, as he is genuine, unlike her boyfriend Kent Woodlands and her sorority sisters. Gradually, Carolyn's affection for Pumpkin inspires him to abandon his wheelchair and work hard to become the best athlete on the team.

Carolyn and Pumpkin's attraction deepens, for which Carolyn receives backlash from her friends and family. Eventually, the two become intimate, and are found in Pumpkin's bed by his mother Judy, who accuses her of raping her son, saying she "has no idea what she has done" to him. She calls the dean of SCSU, and Carolyn is kicked out of the university. While at her parents' home, Carolyn attempts suicide by ingesting pills, though she vomits them out afterwards.

Unable to forget about Carolyn, Kent goes to AO Pi and tells the sorority girls to bring back Carolyn or else he won't attend the formal. AO Pi convinces SCSU to allow her back in, and she is encouraged to attend the sorority ball with Kent, with Julie hoping this will help the sorority win the award. At the ball, Pumpkin and his friends crash the festivities, wanting to dance with Carolyn. Kent confronts Pumpkin and the two come to blows, after which a humiliated Kent leaves. Despite the sorority sisters trying to stop them from doing so, Carolyn and Pumpkin share a dance alone, gradually being joined by others.

Driving erratically, a distraught Kent swerves to avoid a truck and plunges off a cliff with the car exploding in mid-air, crashing into a river. At the hospital, Carolyn finds that he is now paraplegic, and he blames her for what happened. AO Pi ends their involvement with the team and their rival sorority wins the award. Carolyn ends her relationship with Pumpkin and announces to the sorority that she is leaving SCSU to enroll at Long Beach Tech.

At LBT, Carolyn begins to open up to her encouraging peers. AO Pi later has a change of heart and attends the Olympic event, where a now-humbled Kent is the team's coach. Pumpkin races against his rival, a bully who often berates him. Kent motivates him by telling him to win it for Carolyn, as she wouldn't want him to lose. As he is running, he sees Carolyn in the stands, giving him a burst of energy to win the race. As he is congratulated by everyone, Carolyn approaches and his mother finally accepts their relationship. They walk off together, discussing what name Pumpkin would prefer to be called, and Carolyn wondering if Pumpkin's earlier question about the moon was literal or metaphorical. Carolyn glances back with an ambiguous expression before leaving with Pumpkin.

== Cast ==
- Christina Ricci as Carolyn McDuffy
- Hank Harris as Jesse "Pumpkin" Romanoff
- Brenda Blethyn as Judy Romanoff
- Dominique Swain as Jeanine Kryszinsky
- Marisa Coughlan as Julie Thurber
- Sam Ball as Kent Woodlands
- Harry J. Lennix as Robert Meary
- Nina Foch as Betsy Collander
- Michelle Krusiec as Anne Chung
- Melissa McCarthy as Cici Pinkus
- Caroline Aaron as Claudia Prinsinger
- Lisa Banes as Chippy McDuffy
- Julio Oscar Mechoso as Dr. Frederico Cruz
- Phil Reeves as Burt Wohlfert
- Marisa Parker aka Marisa Petroro as Courtney Burke
- Tait Smith as Hansie Prinsinger
- Michael Bacall as Casey Whitner
- Amy Adams as Alex

== Reception ==
=== Box office ===
Pumpkin opened in American theatres on June 28, 2002, in a limited release. It grossed $30,514 in eight theatres in its first weekend, with a per-screen-average of $3,814. The film expanded to 19 theatres the following weekend, but its theatre count declined from there. Pumpkin completed its theatrical run four months later with a final gross of $308,552.

=== Critical response ===
Pumpkin received mixed reviews from critics. On Rotten Tomatoes the movie has a score of 36% based on 74 reviews, with an average rating of 5.1/10. The site’s critics consensus reads: "The messy Pumpkin wastes its premise by not making the satire sharp enough." On Metacritic the film has a score of 46 out of 100 based on reviews from 24 critics, indicating "mixed or average reviews".

One of the most positive reviews was by Roger Ebert for the Chicago Sun-Times; he wrote, "Pumpkin is alive, and takes chances, and uses the wicked blade of satire in order to show up the complacent political correctness of other movies in its campus genre." Michael O'Sullivan of The Washington Post also approved of the film, calling it "an odd and oddly endearing romantic black comedy." On the other end of the spectrum, Todd McCarthy of Variety wrote that the film "gets along on curiosity value for a while, but becomes increasingly unconvincing and ludicrous as it staggers endlessly toward the finish line."

Since its DVD release, the film has become a cult film. Ricci herself has called it "a great movie" and Jeff Weiss of Stylus magazine called it "one of the most underrated films of the decade." Albert Nowicki of Movies Room ranked it among the fifteen best overlooked 21st century indie films.

== See also ==
- List of films about the sport of athletics
