= Tower to the People =

Tower to the People - Tesla's Dream at Wardenclyffe Continues
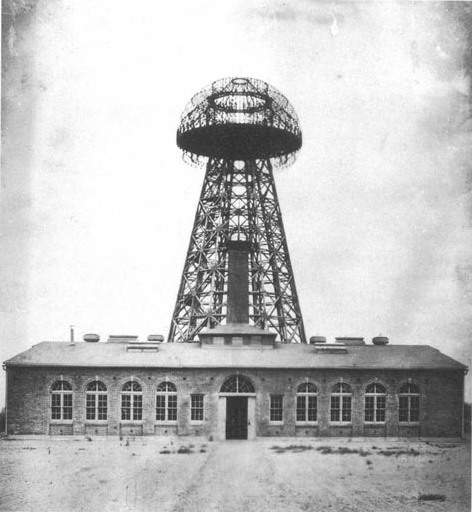
- A 1904 image of Wardenclyffe Tower
- Directed by: Joseph Sikorski
- Produced by: Colossal Molehill Productions
- Starring: Joseph Bessette; Matt Donnelly; Matthew Inman; Penn Jillette
- Release date: October 4, 2015
- Running time: 120 minutes
- Country: United States
- Language: English
- Budget: $150,000

Tower to the People - Tesla's Dream at Wardenclyffe Continues is a 2015 documentary film directed by Joseph Sikorski about Nikola Tesla's Wardenclyffe Tower. The film documents the history and subsequent decline of the Wardenclyffe complex designed and built by Tesla in Shoreham, New York, as the main laboratory and facility for his experiments on wireless power transmission.

Sikorski focuses his documentary on the role of J.P. Morgan, one of the main investors behind the project, claiming Morgan pulled his support after realizing free wireless energy would hurt his own business interests. Tesla could not find additional investments and in 1906 the project was abandoned and never became operational. After over a century of decay, the tower site was rescued by a successful fundraising campaign and will be converted into a museum – the Tesla Science Center at Wardenclyffe – honoring the legacy of the Serbian American inventor.

The film builds on Fragments from Olympus, a feature and original screenplay about Tesla's life written by Joseph Sikorski and Michael Calomino which received a "best screenplay" award at the Long Island International Film Expo in 2010.

The distribution of the documentary was supported by a crowdfunding campaign hosted on Indiegogo and by an appeal published by comics writer Matthew Inman, who also features in the film. On October 4, 2014 the documentary premiered at the New Yorker Hotel in New York City, the same place where Tesla died in 1943. Director Jim Jarmusch, Tesla's great grandnephew William Terbo, the Consul General of Serbia Mirjana Zivkovic were among the guests. The official release date in the United States is October 4, 2015.
