= Steve Peters (game designer) =

American game designer

- Steve Peters in Paris (2008)
- Born: 1961 (age 64–65); Los Angeles, California, United States
- Occupation: Experience Designer

Steve Peters (born 1961) is an American independent game designer and experience designer specializing in alternate reality games and transmedia storytelling. Steve was Chief Creative Officer at No Mimes Media, an Alternate Reality Game company which he co-founded with Maureen McHugh and Behnam Karbassi in March 2009. From 2011 to 2012, he was VP of Experience Design at Fourth Wall Studios, where he was Lead Experience Designer for their Emmy® Award-Winning series Dirty Work, among others. From 2012 through 2017, he hosted the StoryForward Podcast, a show that explored the future of storytelling and entertainment.

From July 2006 to December 2008, he worked with 42 Entertainment as Experience Designer, Game Designer and/or Community Manager. Projects on which he worked while at 42 Entertainment included Why So Serious (for the film The Dark Knight), Year Zero (for the Nine Inch Nails album Year Zero), The Vanishing Point (Microsoft's Vista Release), Dead Man's Tale (for the film Pirates of the Caribbean II: Dead Man's Chest), and Last Call Poker (Activision's Game Gun).

In 2003, Steve was a designer for Metacortechs (an independent alternate reality game based in the Matrix universe), and founded the Alternate Reality Gaming Network (now ARGNet) in 2002.

== Select credits ==
- Mesmer & Braid (Alternate Reality Game): Co-Designer (2020)
- Twenty One Pilots' Level of Concern (Alternate Reality Game): ARG Experience Designer (2020)
- Blackout Interactive Series: Transmedia Experience Designer (2019)
- The Quest for the Golden Bananas (Global Treasure Hunt): Lead Experience Designer (2018)
- Endgame: Ancient Societies (Alternate Reality Game): Experience Designer (2015)
- Dark Detour: Creator, Writer, Experience Designer (2014, 2015)
- Redrum: Lead Experience Designer (2013)
- RVC: VP of Experience Design (2013)
- Dirty Work: Transmedia Design (2012)
- Meridian: Experience Designers, Transmedia Creative Director, Transmedia Design (2012)
- 6:14: VP of Experience Design (2012)
- Whispers: VP of Experience Design (2012)
- Flare: VP of Experience Design (2012)
- Airship Dracula: VP of Experience Design (2012)
- The Swarming: Transmedia Design (2012)
- Claire: Experience Designer (2012)
- The Gamblers: VP of Experience Design (2012)
- Goldfish Theatre: Lead Experience Designer (2012)
- Home: A Ghost Story: Senior Experience Designer, Transmedia Design (2012)
- Webishades (Alternate Reality Game): Lead Experience Designer (2010)
- The Hunt (Alternate Reality Game): Lead Experience Designer (2010)
- Mime Academy (Alternate Reality Game): Lead Experience Designer (2009)
- The Threshold (Alternate Reality Game): Lead Experience Designer (2009)
- 6 Minutes to Midnight (Alternate Reality Game): Experience Designer (2009)
- Why So Serious (Alternate Reality Game): Designer (2008)
- Year Zero (Alternate Reality Game): Designer (2007)
- The Vanishing Point (Alternate Reality Game): Designer (2007)
- Dead Man's Tale: Designer (2006)
- Last Call Poker (Alternate Reality Game): Independent Design Contractor (2005)
- Metacortechs (Alternate Reality Game): Designer (2003)
