= TRANSform Me =

American television series

- Genre: Reality
- Created by: Abby Terkuhle; Kristine Patnugot; Robert Jason
- Starring: Jamie Clayton; Laverne Cox; Nina Poon
- Country of origin: United States
- Original language: English
- No. of seasons: 1
- No. of episodes: 8

Production
- Executive producers: Banks Tarver; Ken Druckerman; Danielle Gelfand; Kari McFarland
- Production company: Left/Right Productions

Original release
- Network: VH1
- Release: March 15 – May 3, 2010

TRANSform Me is an American reality television series that premiered March 15, 2010, on VH1. The series shows a cisgender female contestant as she is given a makeover by a team of three trans women stylists. Laverne Cox produced and starred in TRANSform Me, making her the first African-American trans woman to produce and star in her own TV show.

== Episodes ==
No.	Title	Original release date
1	"Nicole"	March 15, 2010
2	"Christina"	March 22, 2010
3	"Carissa"	March 29, 2010
4	"Marlece"	April 5, 2010
5	"Lindsey"	April 12, 2010
6	"Tiffany"	April 19, 2010
7	"Jackie"	April 26, 2010
8	"Phaea"	May 3, 2010
