= Cathy's Book =

Novel by Sean Stewart and Jordan Weisman

Cathy's Book: If Found Call (650) 266-8233
- First edition
- Author: Sean Stewart and Jordan Weisman
- Illustrator: Cathy Brigg
- Language: English
- Genre: Young adult fiction, fantasy
- Publisher: Running Press
- Publication date: 2006
- Publication place: United States
- Media type: Print ()
- Pages: 143
- ISBN: 9780762426560
- Followed by: Cathy's Key

Cathy's Book: If Found Call (650) 266-8233 is a young adult novel with alternative reality game elements by Sean Stewart and Jordan Weisman, illustrated by Cathy Brigg. It was first published October 3, 2006 by Running Press. It includes an evidence packet filled with letters, phone numbers, pictures, and birth certificates, as well as doodles and notes written by Cathy in the page margins.

== Synopsis ==
The book follows a teenage girl whose boyfriend has left her. Wanting to find out why, she follows clues with her best friend. These lead to various explanations.

In a framing device, young and artistic Cathy left the book for Emma, her best friend, so that the latter can use the clues provided and figure out where Cathy went. The story begins when Cathy is dumped by her boyfriend, Victor. The next morning she notices a strange mark on her arm, but sets it aside as a spider bite. She and Emma later determine that the mark on her arm is in fact a needle mark from a blood test Victor performed on Cathy. While trying to confront Victor about the blood test, she encounters various members of the mythical, immortal, Chinese Eight Ancestors, as well as adventure and mystery. It also includes phone numbers which readers can call in order to leave a message for Bianca, Cathy, Victor, Emma, and even Tsao's business, Airwell Organisation.

== Recognition ==
In November 2006, Cathy's Book debuted at #7 on the New York Times Best Seller list for Children's Books.

== Following ==
Readers/players discuss their theories online about where Cathy ends up after the book, where Victor is, whether Cathy's father is dead or alive, as well as many, many others. Though the book was aimed at an audience of teen girls, the following includes all ages and genders.

== Advertising agreements ==
The book's authors and publishers agreed to include references to the CoverGirl makeup line in exchange for advertising space on the BeingGirl web site. The references were deleted in the novel's paperback version.

== Sequels ==
Two sequels, Cathy's Key (2008) and Cathy's Ring (2009), have been published.
