= Kristen Rutherford =

American writer, producer and actress (born 1968)

- Born: October 15, 1968 (age 57)
- Citizenship: United States
- Occupations: Writer, actress, producer
- Spouse: Vincent Rutherford
- Children: 1

Kristen Rutherford (born October 15, 1968) is an American writer, producer and actress.

She may be best known for her work as the head writer/creative producer of The Nerdist on BBC America, and for being the host of the “#parent” show on Felicia Day’s Geek & Sundry network. She also has gained a cult following for playing the voice of “Melissa”, "Durga” and “The Sleeping Princess” in the alternate reality game I Love Bees.

She has written for many shows including Pop Up Video, Attack of the Show! and Ninja Warrior. Rutherford has also worked for LucasFilm; first in 2009 with Olivia Munn, writing and producing 2 short films for The Star Wars Fan Film Challenge, and again in 2012 as the writer of the Star Wars Celebration: Transmission VI show.

She resides in Los Angeles with her husband, producer Vincent Rutherford and her daughter Vivienne Ripley, born 2009.
