= Perfect Circle (novel) =

2004 novel by Sean Stewart

- Cover of first edition (hardcover)
- Author: Sean Stewart
- Language: English
- Genre: Science fiction novel
- Publisher: Small Beer Press
- Publication date: 2004
- Publication place: United States
- Media type: Print (Hardcover & Paperback)
- ISBN: 1-931520-07-0
- OCLC: 55847884
- Dewey Decimal: 813/.54 22
- LC Class: PR9199.3.S794 P47 2004

Perfect Circle is a 2004 novel by Sean Stewart. It was nominated for Nebula Award for Best Novel in 2004 and the World Fantasy Award for Best Novel in 2005. It is a contemporary realistic fantasy about an exorcist in Texas.

== Plot introduction ==
Texan William Kennedy can see and talk to ghosts – an ability which complicates his life immensely and threatens his relationships with family and friends. When his cousin calls him in about a ghost in the garage, Will finds he has a murderer to deal with.

== Critical reception ==
In a review for SF Site, Donna McMahon concluded: "This is a real rarity -- an intelligent, sensitive and entertaining novel about what it means to be male. I think it will speak most strongly to men, but it should appeal to many readers, mainstream as well as genre."
