= Hank Harris =

American actor (born 1979)

- Born: November 5, 1979 (age 46); Duluth, Minnesota, US
- Occupation: Actor

Hank Harris (born November 5, 1979) is an American actor who has been working in movies and television since the late 1990s. He grew up in Duluth, Minnesota and Santa Fe, New Mexico.

He is perhaps best known for his role as Emory Dick in Popular. His other projects have included: Mercury Rising, Pumpkin, Hellbent and the television series Dirty Work. A commercial actor, Harris is best known for appearing in 11 Chef Boyardee commercials in the 90s as the "beefy boy", as well as ones for McDonald's, Wendy's, Burger King, Dr. Pepper, and T-Mobile.

== Filmography ==
Film
Year	Title	Role	Notes
1997	Fyre Ants Rock	Davey	Short
1998	Mercury Rising	Isaac	
1999	Sign of the Times	Toby	Also writer
2001	Delivering Milo	Mr. Percival	
2001	Pearl Harbor	Young Harbor Patrolman	Deleted scene
2002	Pumpkin	Pumpkin Romanoff	
2003	Milwaukee, Minnesota	Stan Stites	
2004	Just Hustle	Detective's researcher	
2004	Hellbent	Joey	
2004	Breaking Dawn	Ted	
2008	Extreme Movie	Ronny	
2009	Adelaide	Brad	Short
2011	The Company of Thieves	Dex	Short
2013	Insidious: Chapter 2	Young Carl	
2019	Duke	Roost	

Television
Year	Title	Role	Notes
1997	Mr. Rhodes	Edgar	Episode: "The Sexism Show"
1997	ARK, the Adventures of Animal Rescue Kids	Noah	
1997	Smart Guy	Locker Kid	Episode: "Lab Rats"
1997	The Secret World of Alex Mack	Nathan	Recurring, 2 episodes
1998	Maggie	Curt	Episode: "Maggie's First Save"
1998	The Adventures of A.R.K.	Noah	
1999	The New Adventures of A.R.K.	Noah	
1999	7th Heaven	Moe	Episode: "It Happened One Night"
1999	Brookfield	Trip Heyward	TV movie
1999-2001	Popular	Emory Dick	Recurring, 12 episodes
2001	Providence	Charlie Alway	Episode: "The Mating Dance"
2001	The X-Files	Dylan Lokensgard	Episode: "Lord of the Flies"
2002	So Little Time	Band Member	Episode: "Larrypalooza"
2002	Star Trek: Enterprise	Jack	Episode: "Carbon Creek"
2003	The Lyon's Den	Charlie Yerrin	Recurring, 5 episodes
2004	Nip/Tuck	Calvin Murray	Episode: "Christian Troy"
2007	CSI: NY	Johnny O'Dell	Episode: "Down the Rabbit Hole"
2009	Ghost Whisperer	Zack Garrett	Episode: "Cause for Alarm"
2010	Greek	Ryan Yarlbrough	Episode: "Pride & Punishment"
2010	Saving Grace	Pete	Episode: "I Killed Kristin"
2011	Bones	Kent Durham	Episode: "The Feet on the Beach"
2011	Death Valley	Todd	Episode: "Zombie Fights"
2011	Castle	Chad Hockney	Episode: "Heroes and Villains"
2012	Dirty Work	Pete	Recurring, 3 episodes
2013	Supernatural	Gerry/Boltar the Furious	Episode: "LARP and the Real Girl"
2014	NCIS	Denny Johnson	Episode: "Rock and a Hard Place"
2015	Grimm	Andy Harrison	Episode: "Trial by Fire"
2015	Salem	Corwin	Recurring, 2 episodes
2015	The Man in The High Castle	Randall	Recurring, 2 episodes
2016	Rizzoli & Isles	Zachary Bales/Jeremy Kendricks	Episode: "Cops vs. Zombies"
2016	Once Upon a Time	Dr. Jekyll	Recurring, 5 episodes
2017	Twin Peaks	Prison Tech	1 episode
