= CoverGirl =

American cosmetics brand

- Type: Subsidiary
- Industry: Fashion
- Founded: January 1961; 65 years ago
- Founder: Noxzema Chemical Company
- Headquarters: Maryland, U.S.
- Area served: Worldwide
- Products: Cosmetics
- Parent: Coty, Inc.
- Website: www.covergirl.com

CoverGirl is an American cosmetics brand founded in Maryland, United States, by the Noxzema Chemical Company. It was acquired by Procter & Gamble in 1989, and later acquired by Coty, Inc. in 2016. The Noxell Company advertised this cosmetics line by allowing "cover girls,” models, actresses, and singers who appear on the front cover of women's magazines, to wear its products. CoverGirl primarily provides a wide variety of consumer-grade cosmetics.

== History ==
CoverGirl's first product line, Clean Makeup, launched in 1961. It was nominated as America's best cosmetic brand. Initially offering only six products, it was advertised as being a "medicated face makeup" as it used Noxzema's medicated ingredients of camphor, menthol, and eucalyptus.

In 1963, model (and later, actress) Jennifer O'Neill signed on as CoverGirl spokeswoman at the age of 14, appearing in both print and television advertising that year. Her unprecedented 30-year endorsement of the product catapulted CoverGirl into being the top-selling makeup line in the country. Cybill Shepherd was one of CoverGirl's earliest models, appearing in several print and television advertisements for the brand. In contrast to the "made-up" looking fashion models of the late 1960s, Shepherd demonstrated a fresh, wholesome look, appealing to a younger consumer's taste. These advertisements established the "girl-next-door" look that CoverGirl would become associated with. In 1979, Cheryl Tiegs (often cited as America's first supermodel) was selected by the company to represent the brand by signing a five-year, 1.5 million-dollar contract with them. This was, at the time, the highest paid contract ever offered to a model.

Sales of the line increased during 1985 due to an advertising campaign featuring supermodel Christie Brinkley. In 1997, CoverGirl launched what is now the famous slogan, "Easy, breezy, beautiful..." This was meant to imply the products would give the user a natural look. This eventually led to an increase of sales, and a larger audience of teenage girls was effectively targeted. The products of the line are still in production, and continue changing as new ideas come along.

Also representing CoverGirl are Drew Barrymore, Zooey Deschanel, Ellen DeGeneres, Dania Ramirez, Christobelle Grierson-Ryrie, Rihanna, Queen Latifah, Sofia Vergara, Taylor Swift, Zendaya, Janelle Monáe, and Pink, who touts the company's foundation product.

CoverGirl was once one of the largest global brands to conduct animal testing, but that is no longer the case.

In January 2010, Procter & Gamble launched "Clean Makeup for Clean Water," a charitable program aimed toward providing clean drinking water to places and people in need. Dania Ramirez is the newest spokesmodel for CoverGirl's Clean Makeup Sensitive formula, a campaign for CoverGirl's partnership with Children's Safe Drinking Water. With the help of the Clean Makeup line, CoverGirl has donated $500,000 to the program, which provided 50 million liters of drinking water to children across the world.

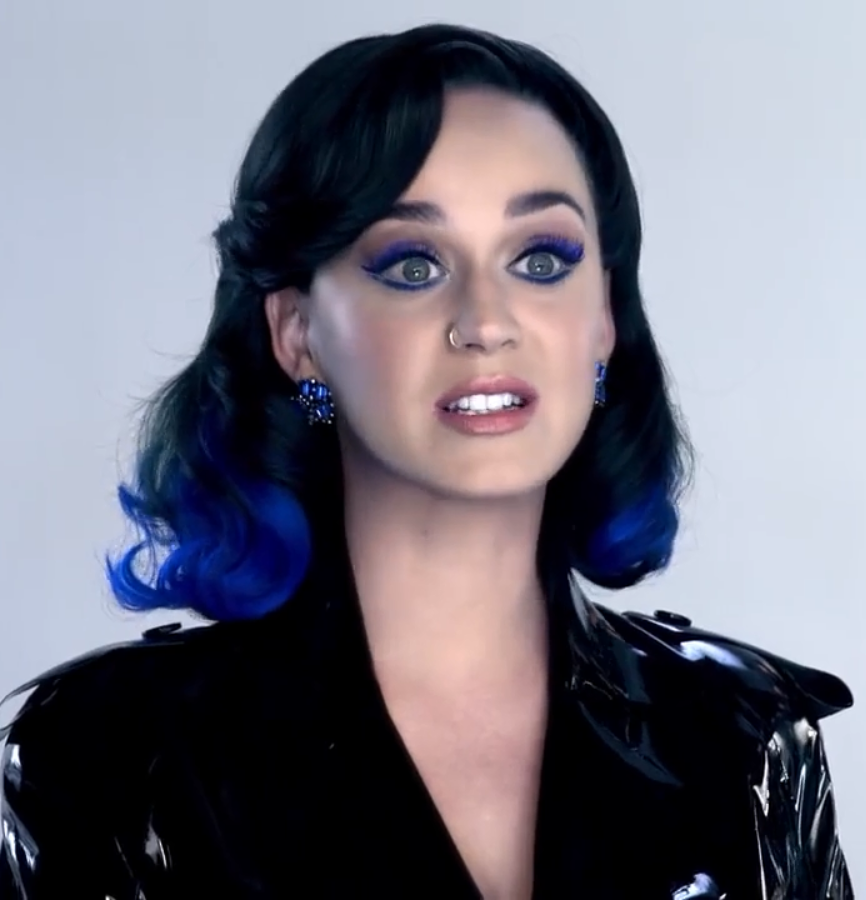
American singer Katy Perry appeared in the campaign's short film in 2017.

In 2017, CoverGirl reinvented their brand by adopting a new strapline "I Am What I Make Up" instead of the past strapline "easy, breezy, beautiful" for 20 years. Their rebrand also includes a new logo, tone, updated packaging and product design. For their new campaign they made a short film, Made in the Mirror, which included celebrities such as chef Ayesha Curry, actress Issa Rae, coach Massy Arias, Katy Perry, Maye Musk, and Shelina Moreda.

In February 2018, the company launched a campaign featuring a model with vitiligo (skin color disorder) for the first time.

== Endorsers ==
=== Lana Ogilvie ===
In 1992, CoverGirl became the first major cosmetic company to sign a black model to an exclusive contract. Canada-born Lana Ogilvie became the first black woman to represent a non-ethnic cosmetics company, and opened the door for traditionally Caucasian-focused brands to embrace different cultures and ethnicities in their brand. Currently, most major brands have one or more black models or celebrities under contract.

=== Celebrities ===
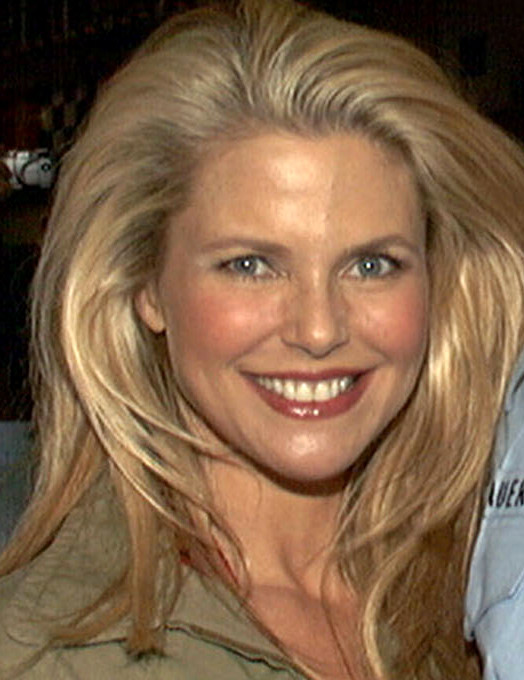
Christie Brinkley's long-running contract with CoverGirl is the longest of any model in history.

Many successful models have represented CoverGirl cosmetics, including Tyra Banks and Carrie Tivador. Singers and actresses including Katy Perry, Brandy, Molly Sims, Faith Hill, Queen Latifah, Rihanna, Keri Russell, Taylor Swift, Dania Ramirez, and Drew Barrymore have also represented the cosmetic line. Because of Jennifer O'Neill's successful 30-year relationship with CoverGirl as spokeswoman, her face has become widely recognized as the face of CoverGirl.

Christie Brinkley modeled for the company for 25 years, the longest-running cosmetics contract of any model in history. YouTuber James Charles became the first male model, and talk show host Ellen DeGeneres has been featured as the model for Simply Ageless cosmetic products. Recently, CoverGirl has contracted American gymnasts Alicia Sacramone, Shawn Johnson, and Nastia Liukin to represent CoverGirl, the first athletes to do so. CoverGirl gave a $100,000 contract to the winners of Cycle 3 through 18 of The CW's popular modeling reality television show, America's Next Top Model, making Eva Pigford, Naima Mora, Nicole Linkletter, Danielle Evans, CariDee English, Jaslene Gonzalez, Saleisha Stowers, Whitney Thompson, McKey Sullivan, Teyona Anderson, Nicole Fox, Krista White, Ann Ward, Brittani Kline, Lisa D'Amato, and Sophie Sumner official cover girls.

In 2011, Paula Patton, Jessica Stam, Taylor Swift, and Sofía Vergara were named the new faces of CoverGirl.

In early 2012, a CoverGirl commercial starring Sofia Vergara and Ellen DeGeneres began airing on national television. The commercial was featured and promoted by both women on The Ellen DeGeneres Show.

In August 2012, Pink and Janelle Monáe were chosen as the newest spokeswomen for CoverGirl.

In June 2013, Nervo became the spokeswomen for CoverGirl.

In September 2013, Katy Perry was chosen as the newest CoverGirl.

In July 2014, Becky G became the face of CoverGirl and featured their products in her music videos.

In January 2016, Zendaya was announced as the newest CoverGirl.

In October 2016, 17-year-old YouTuber James Charles was named as the first ever male spokesperson for the brand.

In September 2017, Ayesha Curry was added as a spokesperson for the brand. She is the first CoverGirl spokesperson who is not an actress, singer, or entertainer.

In 2018, Amy Deanna became CoverGirl's first model with vitiligo.

In October 2019, Lili Reinhart was announced as a spokesperson for the brand.

=== Publishers ===
The authors and publishers of the 2006 novel Cathy's Book agreed with Procter & Gamble to include references to the makeup line in exchange for promoting the book on its self-care BeingGirl website.

== Charity ==
In April 2011, CoverGirl supported the Procter & Gamble Children's Safe Drinking Water campaign. CoverGirl donated all its proceeds from the sale of the special powders, which got launched for the 50th anniversary of the company, to the campaign.

CoverGirl has given checks to several people featured on The Ellen DeGeneres Show, such as Talia Castellano, a 13-year-old American YouTuber with cancer. DeGeneres also announced on her talk show that CoverGirl chose Castellano as an honorary CoverGirl.
