= 42 Entertainment =

American video game development company

- Industry: Media industry, ARG
- Founded: 2003
- Headquarters: Burbank, California, U.S.
- Key people: Susan Bonds (President & CEO); Alex Lieu (Chief Creative Officer); Michael Borys (VP of Interactive Design); Johnny Rodriguez (VP of Visual Design); George Cook; Bob Fagan
- Website: 42entertainment.com

42 Entertainment is an American company based in Burbank which specializes in creating and producing alternate reality games (ARGs). The company was founded in 2003 as an independently owned, creative content and interactive agency under the name 4orty 2wo Entertainment. The company started with a nine-person management team and was originally based in Emeryville, California. It produced several alternate reality games between 2004 and 2014, as well as campaigns for the movie The Dark Knight, and the Nine Inch Nails Year Zero album.

== History ==
=== Pre-founding ===
While the company did not officially launch until 2003, many of those who would become the management team were involved with creating and producing "The Beast" for Warner Brothers to promote the Steven Spielberg film A.I. The project was developed by Microsoft.

=== Founding ===
The company began as 4orty 2wo Entertainment in 2003 and was launched by a management team which included Bob Fagan, Elan Lee, Sean Stewart and Jordan Weisman from the team which created "The Beast". Notable employees and collaborators between 2003 and 2006 also included Susan Bonds, Joe DiNunzio, Jane McGonigal, Jim Stewartson and John Ziffren.

=== Merge with 3 Pin Media ===
In early 2006, 42 Entertainment merged with 3 Pin Media. The executive team of Michael Borys, Alex Lieu and Johnny Rodriquez joined the company at this time.

=== Changes in 2007 ===
In 2007, Jordan Weisman left the company to found Smith & Tinker. That same year, Elan Lee, Sean Stewart and Jim Stewartson stepped down to found Fourth Wall Studios.

=== Changes in 2008 ===
Creatives Steve Peters, Maureen McHugh and Behnam Karbassi left the company in late 2008, and founded No Mimes Media in March 2009.

== Projects ==
In 2004 42 Entertainment produced I Love Bees, the prequel to the Xbox game Halo 2. Other projects followed in 2005, such as (client in parentheses) Hex 168 (Microsoft Gaming Studios/Xbox 360), MSN Found (Windows Live Search) and Last Call Poker (Activision's GUN). In 2006, the company created Dead Man's Tale, an interactive game for Windows Messenger and Disney's Pirates of the Caribbean.

In 2007, 42 Entertainment created The Vanishing Point for Windows Vista, which offered a sub-orbital trip to space as a grand prize. The company was also behind Year Zero, which had them working with Trent Reznor to build out a world for the Nine Inch Nails album Year Zero. The Year Zero game was hailed by Rolling Stone as "the most innovative promotion scheme since the leaked sex tape." Although Reznor insisted that the game was an extension of the album rather than a marketing attempt, it nonetheless was awarded a Cyber Grand Prix for digital marketing at the 2008 Cannes Lions.

Starting in 2008, projects from 42 Entertainment include Stop the International (Columbia Tri-Star), If Looks Could Kill (Burrell/Toyota Camry), Bizarro is Here (Six Flags), Project Abraham (SCEA's Resistance 2), and Why So Serious?, an alternate reality game for the Warner Bros. movie The Dark Knight. In 2009, 42 Entertainment started the Flynn Lives Campaign for the Disney film Tron: Legacy.

42 Entertainment's latest contribution to alternate reality games is 2014's Paper Trail downloadable content for Infamous Second Son, item released on the same year as the game.

As well as its involvement in the video game industry, 42 Entertainment worked on a fan documentary for the German DJ Zedd's 2015 album True Colors, which was released in 2016.
