= Jamie Clayton =

American actress and model (born 1978)

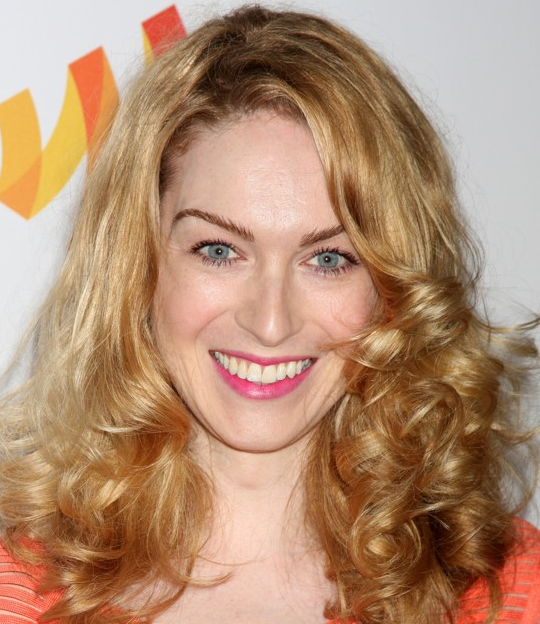
- Clayton in 2012
- Born: January 15, 1978 (age 48); San Diego, California, U.S.
- Occupations: Actress; model
- Years active: 2010–present
- Known for: Sense8

Jamie Clayton (born January 15, 1978) is an American actress and model. Clayton is best known for starring as Nomi Marks in the Netflix original series Sense8, Sasha Booker in the third season of Designated Survivor and Tess Van De Berg in Showtime's The L Word: Generation Q. She portrayed Pinhead in the 2022 Hellraiser film.

== Early life ==
Clayton was raised in San Diego, California where she was born. Her father, Howard Clayton, was a criminal defense attorney, and her mother, Shelley, is an event planner. When she was 19, in 1997, Clayton moved to New York City to pursue a career as a makeup artist. In 2008, The New York Observer featured an article describing her as the second most beautiful girl in New York.

== Career ==
In 2010, Clayton was the makeup artist and co-host on VH1's first makeover show TRANSform Me alongside Laverne Cox and Nina Poon. The following year she played the recurring role of Kyla in the third season of the HBO series Hung. In 2012, Clayton played the lead role of Michelle Darnell on the Emmy Award winning interactive web series Dirty Work.

She also narrated the audiobook for the children's novel Melissa about a young transgender girl.

Clayton starred as one of the eight main characters in the Netflix original television series Sense8 that premiered on June 5, 2015. In Sense8, she played Nomi Marks, a trans woman, political blogger, and hacker living in San Francisco. Clayton said that she was primarily interested in Sense8 because of the opportunity to play a transgender character written by filmmakers Lilly and Lana Wachowski and to be on set with them. Being a fan of science fiction and J. Michael Straczynski in particular also attracted her to this project.

Clayton appeared in the 2016 film The Neon Demon and the 2017 thriller film The Snowman. In 2019, Clayton starred as Sasha Booker in the third season of the Netflix's Designated Survivor. Beginning in 2019, Clayton starred in The L Word: Generation Q, the sequel to the Showtime original The L Word. She also guest starred in The CW’s Roswell: New Mexico. In 2022, Clayton portrayed Pinhead in the 2022 Hellraiser film.

== Personal life ==
Clayton is a trans woman. In 2011, she was honored by Out magazine as part of their annual "Out 100" awards.

== Filmography ==
Film, television and video games roles
Year	Title	Role	Notes
2010	TRANSform Me	Herself	Reality TV series
2011	Hung	Kyla	2 episodes (season 3)
2012	Dirty Work	Michelle	Lead role
2012	Are We There Yet?	Carla Favers	Episode: "The Wrong Way Episode"
2013	Hustling	Nadya	Episode: "Sugar"
2015–2018	Sense8	Nomi Marks	Main role
2016	The Neon Demon	Casting Director	Film
2016	Motive	Avery Bowman	Episode: "The Dead Name"
2016	Bojack Horseman	Mom Donkey	Episode: "Best Thing That Ever Happened"
2016	Same Same	Niamh	Episode: "Scissr"
2017	Mass Effect: Andromeda	Jien Garson	Video game
2017	The Snowman	Edda	Film
2017	The Chain	Dr. Ryan	Film
2018	Same Same	Niamh	Web series
2019	Designated Survivor	Sasha Booker	Recurring role (season 3)
2019–2023	The L Word: Generation Q	Tess Van De Berg	16 episodes
2020	Roswell, New Mexico	Agent Grace Powell/Charlie Cameron	3 episodes
2020	Disclosure: Trans Lives on Screen	Herself	Documentary film
2020	Equal	Christine Jorgensen	Docuseries
2020	Red Bird Lane	Jessica	Pilot
2022	Hellraiser	Pinhead	Film
2024	Twilight of the Gods	The Seid-Kona	Voice role
