= Sean Stewart =

American novelist (born 1965)

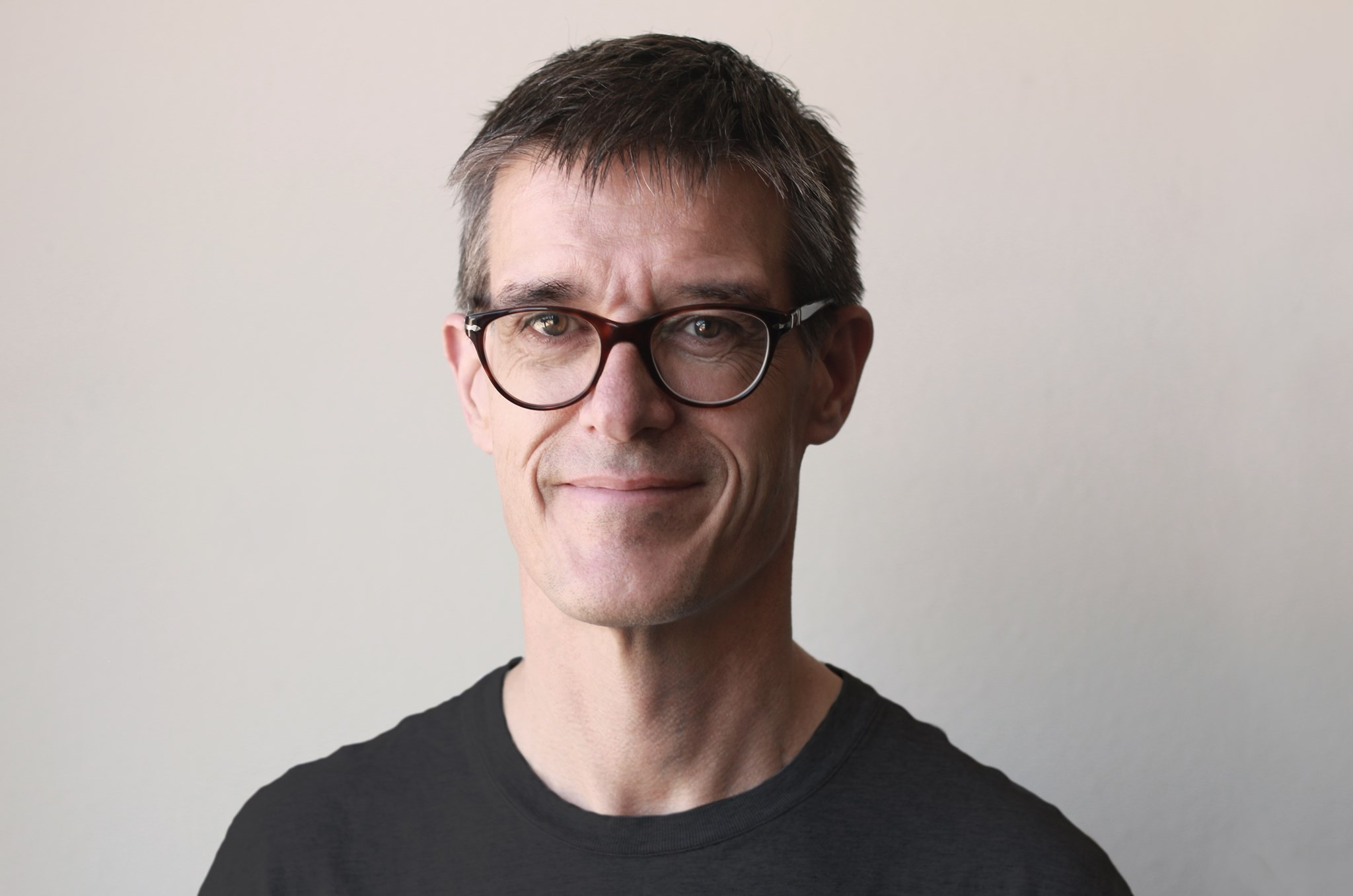
- Born: June 2, 1965 (age 61); Lubbock, Texas, U.S.
- Education: University of Alberta
- Occupation: Writer

Sean Stewart (born June 2, 1965) is the pseudonym of Michael Sean Irwin, an American-Canadian science fiction and fantasy author.

== Biography ==
Born in Lubbock, Texas, Stewart moved to Edmonton, Alberta, Canada in 1968. He later moved to Texas, Vancouver, British Columbia, then multiple cities in California where he resides as of 2025.

He received an Honors degree in English from University of Alberta in 1987, following which he spent many years writing novels. He gradually moved from writing novels to interactive fiction, first as lead writer on the Web-based alternate reality game () The Beast, for which he won a Peabody in 2022.

Stewart served as a consultant on several computer games, and was on the management team of the 42 Entertainment experiential marketing and entertainment company, where he was lead writer for Haunted Apiary aka ilovebees and Last Call Poker. His novel series Cathy's Book (and its sequels) seems to represent the melding of his two careers, as it crosses the alternate reality game format with a teen novel. In 2007, he and several 4orty2wo co-founders left that company to start Fourth Wall Studios, where they won an Emmy for interactive television in 2013. In 2014, he joined Microsoft's Xbox Studios as Creative Director. After Xbox Studios closed in late 2014, Stewart began consulting for Magic Leap, joining them as Creative Director/Design Director in early 2016.

== Bibliography ==
- Passion Play (1992, science fiction novel, winner of the Prix Aurora and Arthur Ellis Awards)
- Nobody's Son (1994, fantasy novel, winner of the Aurora Award)
- Resurrection Man (1995, magic realist fantasy novel, New York Times Best Science Fiction Book of the Year)
- Clouds End (1996, heroic fantasy novel)
- The Night Watch (1997, set in the same world as Resurrection Man)
- Mockingbird (1998, New York Times Notable Book of the Year, World Fantasy Award nominee, Speculations Readers' Poll Best Book of the Year)
- Galveston (2000, World Fantasy Award and Sunburst Award winner, again set in the same world as Resurrection Man)
- Perfect Circle (2004, another magic realist fantasy novel; Nebula nominee; also published under the title Firecracker)
- Yoda: Dark Rendezvous (Star Wars: A Clone Wars Novel) (2004)
- Cathy's Book (2006)
- Cathy's Key (2008)
- Cathy's Ring (2009)
