= Dirty Work (TV series) =

- Genre: Comedy
- Created by: Aaron Shure; Zach Schiff-Abrams; John Newman
- Directed by: Eric Appel
- Starring: Jamie Clayton; Hank Harris; Mary Lynn Rajskub
- Country of origin: United States
- Original language: English
- No. of seasons: 1
- No. of episodes: 3

Production
- Executive producers: Elan Lee; Zach Schiff-Abrams; Sean Stewart; Jim Stewartson
- Producers: Jackie Turnure; Adam Hendricks
- Production location: United States
- Editor: Roger F. Powell
- Camera setup: Carl Herse

Original release
- Release: April 30, 2012

Dirty Work is a Emmy Award winning comedy series which debuted in 2012 and stars Jamie Clayton, Hank Harris and Mary Lynn Rajskub. The series is produced by Fourth Wall Studios for their proprietary platform.

== Plot ==
The comedic adventures of three Los Angelenos working in the crime scene clean up business.

== Cast ==
- Jamie Clayton as Michelle
- Mary Lynn Rajskub as Roxy
- Matt Jones as Hummy
- Hank Harris as Pete
- Moira Quirk as Dikran
- Matt Jones as Hummy
