= The Beast (game) =

2001 alternate reality game

- Developer: Microsoft
- Publisher: Microsoft
- Platform: Browser
- Release: WW: 2001
- Genre: Puzzle

The Beast is an alternate reality game developed by Microsoft to promote the 2001 film A.I. Artificial Intelligence. Entry points to the game embedded into the film's promotion centered on the fictional Jeanine Salla and the death of her friend Evan Chan. In 2142, Jeanine learns that Evan was murdered and her investigation uncovers a network of murders of humans and artificial intelligences. The game launched on March 8, 2001, and continued running past its initially scheduled end date on June 29, the film's release date.

Players were led through a network of websites created by Warner Bros. registered to fake names, and further clues were given in subsequent promotional materials and events for the film. The game drew a large, tight-knit player base who created online groups dedicated to the game, most prominently the Yahoo! Group Cloudmakers. The Beast was described as "unprecedented even by Hollywood standards" and is considered among the most influential early alternate reality games.

== Game ==
The Beast centers around the fictional Jeanine Salla, who investigates the death of her friend Evan Chan and discovers a cover-up involving a string of murdered humans and artificial intelligences. Players were led through a network of over forty websites created by Warner Bros. via clues left in trailers, print ads, posters, telephone messages, and live promotional events for the film A.I. Artificial Intelligence. The game launched on March 8, 2001, and continued running past its initially scheduled end on June 29, the release date for the film.

=== Premise ===
Set in 2142, roughly forty years after A.I. Artificial Intelligence, Evan Chan is said to be killed in a boating accident aboard his artificial intelligence-enhanced boat Cloudmaker. Dr. Jeanine Salla receives a cryptic message revealing he was murdered and leads an investigation. She discovers that he was having an affair with Venus, a companion bot reprogramed to kill Evan, and that the ensuing cover-up triggers further murders of humans and artificial intelligences. Simultaneously, the Mann Act is brought before the legislature and the president and ultimately put to referendum to decide if artificial intelligence will be treated equal to human citizens.

=== Plot development ===
Clues to the game were distributed through trailers, print ads, posters, telephone messages, and live promotional events for the film A.I. Artificial Intelligence and even in graffiti in public restrooms in major cities throughout the United States. Online, the game was presented through numerous websites in text, photograph, video, and audio based formats.

Players entered the game through one of three entry points, called "rabbit holes" by the development team, centering on Dr. Jeanine Salla: trailers and posters credited Jeanine Salla as the production's "sentient machine therapist", a phone number hidden in another trailer ultimately led to Jeanine, and a promotional poster sent to technology and entertainment media outlets had a code stating, "Evan Chan was murdered. Jeanine is the key." The Beast was launched on March 8, 2001; however, only roughly one hundred players discovered the game in the first few weeks.

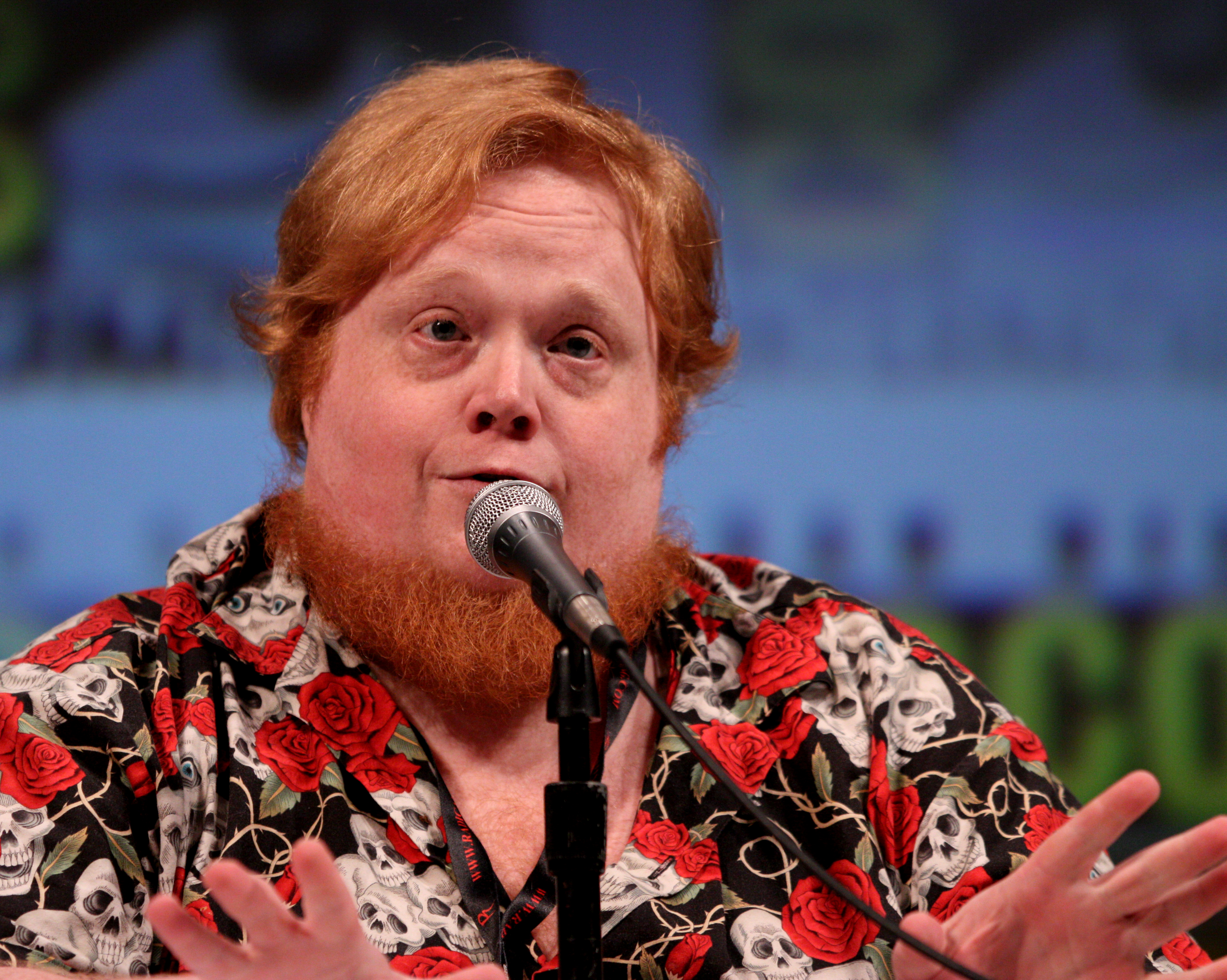
Harry Knowles brought broad attention to The Beast with an Ain't It Cool News article about Jeanine and the websites referencing her.

In April, Harry Knowles of Ain't It Cool News received an email from someone calling himself "claviusbase," a reference to 2001: A Space Odyssey, urging he search the internet for Jeanine Salla. He obliged and discovered numerous websites registered to the same IP address, including one for a Bangalore World University, founded in 2028 and claiming to be Jeanine's employer. He posted an article about the websites to the Ain't It Cool News website on April 11, drawing 25 million hits to The Beast websites that day and over 22,000 messages about The Beast to Ain't It Cool News over two months. CNN stated that Knowles' article was believed to be the first written about the game.

In May, during a presentation of A.I Artificial Intelligence at the Massachusetts Institute of Technology, producer Kathleen Kennedy and actor Haley Joel Osment accepted a question from a presumedly planted audience member about their experience working with Jeanine Salla, and Kennedy afterward distributed business cards for Jeanine containing another game clue. Later that month, "Anti-Robot Militia" rallies in New York City, Chicago, and Los Angeles were staged with actors pretending to protest artificial intelligence.

Jeanine Salla and other characters of The Beast are listed in the film's closing credits.

=== Cloudmakers and player base ===
Cloudmakers, named after the boat on which Evan was murdered, is a Yahoo! Group and website dedicated to the game. The Cloudmakers website was described to be among the first dedicated to the game. Though the total number of players was uncertain, the Cloudmakers group was said to include a majority of the player base. Before the film's release 4,500 to nearly 5,000 users were registered to the group's message board. The founder of the website stated in June 2001 that the discussion list generated tens of thousands of messages weekly. The game was being developed as it was played. While most players came to the plotlines after they had been solidified, the Cloudmakers group was constantly on the cutting edge of the game, pushing the game's developers and influencing the plot. Warnings and messages sent by Cloudmakers members to characters in the story regularly turned up in the plot, and designs/blueprints and databases produced by the group were referenced by and even featured on in-game websites and magazines (as were the efforts of a smaller group, SphereWatch). After the game, the Puppetmasters admitted that they relied on the vast storehouse of knowledge amongst the Cloudmakers and other player groups to be able to meet any puzzle the designers created. For instance, a puzzle near the end of The Beast required that the players understand lute tablature, for which the Cloudmakers were able to find a solution for.

=== Notable Cloudmakers ===
- Cabel Sasser, founder of Panic Inc.
- Andrea Phillips, writer
- Adrian Hon, game designer and author
- Jay Bushman, Emmy Award-winning writer of The Lizzie Bennet Diaries

== Creation and production ==
Though The Beast does not directly reference A.I Artificial Intelligence, the film's producer Kathleen Kennedy stated that the game's intention was develop the film's fictional setting and create a foundation for a series of video games released over five years as part of a "very elaborate long term project with Microsoft and Xbox".

The game was originally scheduled to end with the release of the film on June 29, 2001, but it continued running throughout the summer. Ultimately, fifty websites with a total of about one thousand pages were created for the game. To prevent a connection between the websites and A.I. Artificial Intelligence promotion, the websites were registered to various individuals with the surname Ghaepetto, a reference to Geppetto, and under fake phone numbers and addresses. The game's creators later became known as the "Puppetmasters". The four original Puppetmasters were finally revealed and credited in the film's closing credits, in which they placed game clues and references. The Puppetmasters managed a larger creative team. For instance, Kevin McLeod was assisted by Thuc Doan Nguyen on sites like Cybertronics, Eliza's Tea Room and others. Microsoft also initially denied involvement in the game's development, though this was believed to be part of maintaining the integrity of the game's intrigue.

Jordan Weisman created the original concept, and it was further designed and developed by Elan Lee. Science fiction writer Sean Stewart was brought to the project as head writer. The three, as well as others who had worked on The Beast, would later go on to found 42 Entertainment, a company specializing in alternate reality games. Pete Fenlon, the Producer and Content Lead, served as the fourth of The Beast's four Puppetmasters.

== Reception and legacy ==
The game was described by the Los Angeles Times as "one of the most elaborate movie promotions ever conceived" that is "unprecedented even by Hollywood standards". The Atlantic cites it as the "first truly successful alternate reality game", and Polygon stated it was the first of its kind. The Beast was compared to The Blair Witch Project's marketing campaign, though Knowles felt The Blair Witch Project's campaign was more successful due to the broader appeal of the concept and the longer lifespan of the footage.

Knowles believed that the game's popularity placed pressure on director Steven Spielberg and the studio to produce a film innovative enough to match the interest in the game, stating that the production's secretiveness raised expectations. Despite its success, the game failed to draw an audience to A.I Artificial Intelligence, which domestically grossed less than its budget.

In March 2022 The Beast received a Legacy Peabody Award in the Digital and Interactive category.
