= Exploding Kittens =

2015 American card game

- Designers: Elan Lee and Shane Small
- Illustrators: The Oatmeal
- Publishers: The Oatmeal
- Publication: July 2015
- Genres: Card game
- Languages: English
- Players: 2–5
- Setup time: < 1 minute
- Playing time: 15 minutes
- Chance: Medium
- Ages: 7+
- Website: explodingkittens.com

Exploding Kittens is a casual dedicated deck card game designed by Matthew Inman of The Oatmeal webcomic, Elan Lee and Shane Small, and first published in 2015. Beginning as a Kickstarter project seeking US$10,000 in crowdfunding, it exceeded its goal in eight minutes.

On January 27, 2015, after seven days, it passed 103,000 backers, setting the record for the most backers in Kickstarter history. At completion on February 19, 2015, it had US$8,782,571 in pledges by 219,382 backers. The campaign ended as the fourth most-funded campaign on the crowdfunding site.

The first playtest of Exploding Kittens was recorded on YouTube by Smosh Games, who had the first deck. Delivery to backers started in late July 2015; all backers received the game by September 2015.

== Gameplay ==
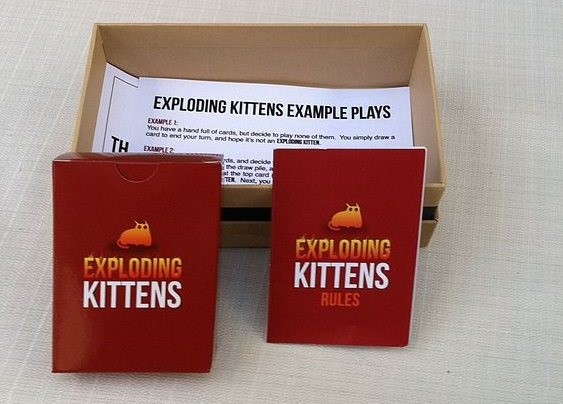

All cards are put into a deck, except for the Defuse and Exploding Kitten cards. The deck is shuffled and each player draws four cards and takes a Defuse card (but in the newer version with extension packs each player draws seven cards and a Defuse card). The Exploding Kitten cards are then shuffled back into the deck so that the number of Exploding Kitten cards in the deck is one less than the number of players. The remaining Defuse cards are then also put back in the deck. A turn order is decided upon any trivial condition.

Each player may then play as many cards from their hand as they like on their turn, or choose not to do so, before drawing a card. Players are not to tell any other player what cards are in their hand. Played cards are put into a discard pile.

If a player draws an Exploding Kitten card, they must show it immediately and they are out of the game unless they have a Defuse card. The last player still in the game wins.

== Development ==
As of 2015, Exploding Kittens stood as the third-biggest campaign ever mounted on Kickstarter. It launched with an initial goal of US$10,000, but by the end of the first day, the campaign had raised $1,333,586 from nearly 35,000 backers. By day four, it had raised more than $3,500,000 from more than 91,000 backers. Ultimately, it raised $8.7 million from 219,382 backers.

On February 3, 2015, achievements were announced in lieu of stretch goals because the game designers did not want to delay production or distribution of the game to backers. As of February 16, 2015, 30 achievements had been unlocked and the second stretch goal (Unlock 20 Achievements) and third stretch goal (Unlock 30 Achievements) were completed. With the first stretch goal accomplished, the company expanded the NSFW deck to a full stand-alone game. The second stretch goal gave all backers an upgraded storage box that holds two full decks of cards, and the third and final stretch goal includes a Kickstarter-exclusive surprise in the box.

Exploding Kittens began shipping to backers in late July 2015.

=== Game conventions ===
At the 2018 South by SouthWest festival, Exploding Kittens maintained a booth that displayed merchandise and had interactive components, such as a large kitten human vending machine.

== Expansions ==
Expanding on the base game of Exploding Kittens, multiple expansion packs have been released, which require a copy of the Exploding Kittens base game to play. These packs add additional cards, new mechanics, and often new gimmicks to the game

The First Expansion, "Imploding Kittens", was released in October 2016. It increased the top number of players from five to six and added 20 new cards. It introduced the cards/mechanics of Alter the Future, Draw from the Bottom, and Reverse from the mobile game, and the new Imploding Kitten card/mechanic.

Next, the "Streaking Kittens" pack was released on October 9, 2018. Its 15 new cards/mechanics included Mark, Swap Top and Bottom, Catomic Bomb, Curse of the Cat Butt, Garbage Collector, Super Skip, and the Streaking Kitten.

The "Barking Kittens" expansion was released on June 5, 2020. Its 20 cards introduced Bury, Alter the Future Now, I'll Take That, Share the Future, Tower of Power, Personal Attack (3x), Potluck and Barking Kittens.

The fourth expansion released in this format was "Zombie Kittens", however, this pack was quickly replaced by the standalone version of the game.

In 2026, two new expansions called "Aggro Kittens" and "Creepy Kittens" released, both containing 11 cards each; these can currently only be found in select Walmarts alongside a new release Streaking Kittens which removed the "Curse of the Cat Butt" and a resell of the Zombie Kittens expansion pack.

=== Variant editions ===
Variant decks for Exploding Kittens have been released that replace the base game with a new set of cards, and which can be played on its own as a standalone game, or (in some cases) can be mixed and implemented with each other and the expansions into one larger game.

A "NSFW" version of the base game was released, with the same mechanics of the base game, just with updated NSFW artwork, along with replacing the standard cats with new variants, such as Bikini Cat & Shy Bladder Cat.

"Zombie Kittens" was next released as a full standalone game, which added new mechanics to allow those previously eliminated players to continue playing once exploded.

Exploding Kittens: Good Versus Evil released in conjunction with the Netflix show, adding new mechanics linked to the characters of God Cat & Devil Cat, with new graphics in the Defuse cards, and an "Armageddon" card that links to the new God Cat & Devil Cat cards.

Exploding Kittens: UK Edition released as another reskin of the base game, just with British references and jokes.

"2-Player Edition" released as a grab and go style game, having a cut back version of the standard deck, providing a travel version of the game.

"Cat Burglar Edition" added a collectible squishy Cat Burglar figure with new mechanics.

"10th Anniversary Edition" was revealed in a collectible tin box with cards originally launched on Kickstarter.

Exploding Kittens: The Board Game is the first board game version. The board completely transforms: in this family game, the goal is to make it to the end of the board without exploding. But one wrong move can cause the board to flip, revealing a whole new path where every move could be their last. Exploding Kittens: The Board Game won the TOTY Game of the Year Award in 2026.

Exploding Kittens: Rage Mode added a "Rage Cat" figurine along with new mechanics featuring more aggressive play and a version with new cards exclusive to Barnes and Noble.

Exploding Kittens: Curse You! added a progressive envelope unlocking feature along with Charms and Curses, allowing players to gain effects that either advantage or disadvantage their hand.

=== Expanded versions ===
Expanded versions of the game have been released, with the main purpose of providing more cards to make the game last longer.

On July 30, 2017, the "Exploding Kittens Party Pack" went on sale exclusively at Target. The party pack is an update to the original game that allows for up to 10 players. It removes the Attack card/mechanic and replaces it with the Slap mechanic from the mobile game. The mechanics introduced in the Imploding Kittens expansion are also included. The Exploding Kittens display at Target stores also contained a hidden shelf containing an update for the Cards Against Humanity game dubbed the Hidden Compartment Pack. This pack contains five cards of the new mechanic, Blind as a Bat, and 15 new white CAH cards.

Following this, a version called “Exploding Kittens: Recipes for Disaster” which provides a greatest hits of cards from many of the previously mentioned games best mechanics into a game with 121 cards, and provides "Recipes" for different cards to use in different decks to play variations of the game. This version can also be played with the other decks, however this is recommended against.

=== Mobile versions ===
Microsoft's Zo chatbot offered a single-player version of Exploding Kittens.

In January 2016, a multiplayer version of the game was released on the iOS platform with new content not found in the original game. In April 2016, the mobile version was also released onto the Android platform, and allowed for cross-platform play between all mobile versions. It was also available on Nintendo Switch.

The Attack, Nope and Favor cards from the original card game were not released in the mobile versions on iOS and Android.

A free-to-play mobile game Exploding Kittens - The Game was announced in April 2022. It was launched on May 31 by Netflix. The game is available to its users at no additional cost and has no in-app purchases.

== TV series adaptation ==
In April 2022, an adult animated television series was also announced by Netflix and was co-produced by Bandera Entertainment and Chernin Entertainment, with King of the Hill creators Mike Judge and Greg Daniels serving as executive producers, alongside Peter Chernin. Additional game mechanics and cards tied to the show will be added to the mobile game at a later date.

The series had a first-look preview at the Annecy International Animation Film Festival on June 14, 2023. A teaser trailer was released on November 11, 2023, followed by a full trailer in May 2024. Originally planned for a late 2023 release, the premiere was postponed to July 12, 2024.

== Additional games ==
The Exploding Kittens team has since used the name of their original game as a brand, and continues to create additional games, including Poetry for Neanderthals and Throw Throw Burrito. The team launched a line for kids called "Kitten Games" and their game "Hurry Up Chicken Butt" won Good Housekeeping's 2024 Best Toy Award.

== In other media ==
Zen Studios released an Exploding Kittens pinball table for Pinball FX on December 7, 2023.
