= Throw Throw Burrito =

Tabletop game

- The original Kickstarter cover for the game
- Publishers: Exploding Kittens
- Genres: Card game
- Players: 2–6

Throw Throw Burrito is a tabletop game created by Matthew Inman, Brian Spence, and Elan Lee, the creators of the previous game Exploding Kittens. Players must throw plush burritos at others and try to hit them to earn points, and win. The game hit its Kickstarter goal of US$10,000 within 16 minutes, and by the time it was finished, 53,643 backers had pledged US$2,559,458.

The game has sold more than 8 million copies.

== Gameplay ==
Gameplay is similar to the card game Spoons. Up to six players sit around a table, and all must simultaneously draw and discard cards, racing to complete three-of-a-kinds. Once someone matches three identical cards, they earn points. Certain cards, called "Burrito Cards", are worth more points and cause a Battle where two or more players must grab one of the two plush burritos and throw them at the other players to try and hit them, causing them to lose points and receive a "burrito bruise" token. Once all of the tokens are divided, the round is over and the payer with the most points receives the "Fear Me Badge". Another round is played, and if the player with the Fear Me Badge wins again, then they win the game. Otherwise, the winners of the two rounds have a Duel to determine the winner, in which the players count down and throw burritos in the style of a Wild West shootout.

== Development ==
The creators' original games were primarily animal-oriented, and the game was originally going to be titled "Blowfish Throwfish", but they shifted away from that idea because according to Lee, they couldn't make a game that "encourages people to throw animals". After that, they "started thinking of inanimate objects that could fit in your hand that would still be cute, but that you could throw". Another working title was "Chuckin' Chimichangas" before they settled on "Throw Throw Burrito".

=== Expansions ===
On March 14, 2023, an expansion pack titled "Block Block Burrito" was launched, introducing new "tortilla shields" which players could use to shield themselves from the burritos, and new cards.

=== Sequel ===
A "sequel" to the game, titled Throw Throw Avocado, was released in 2021. It features similar gameplay, with new battle rules and plush avocados in place of the burritos. The two games can also be combined for play under an expanded ruleset.
