= The Oatmeal =

Webcomic and humor website by Matthew Inman

- The Oatmeal logo
- Website type: Comics, blog
- Available in: English
- Creator: Matthew Inman
- Website: TheOatmeal.com
- Commercial: Yes
- Registration: No
- Launched: July 6, 2009; 17 years ago
- Current status: Active

The Oatmeal is a webcomic and humor website created in 2009 by cartoonist Matthew Inman. It offers original comics, quizzes, and occasional articles. Inman has produced a series of Oatmeal books with content from the webcomic and previously unpublished material, related board games, and other merchandise. The website won the Eisner Award for Best Digital/Webcomic in 2014.

In 2019, Inman announced plans to step back from The Oatmeal for a while to concentrate on other work including the "Exploding Kittens" television series.

== Website ==
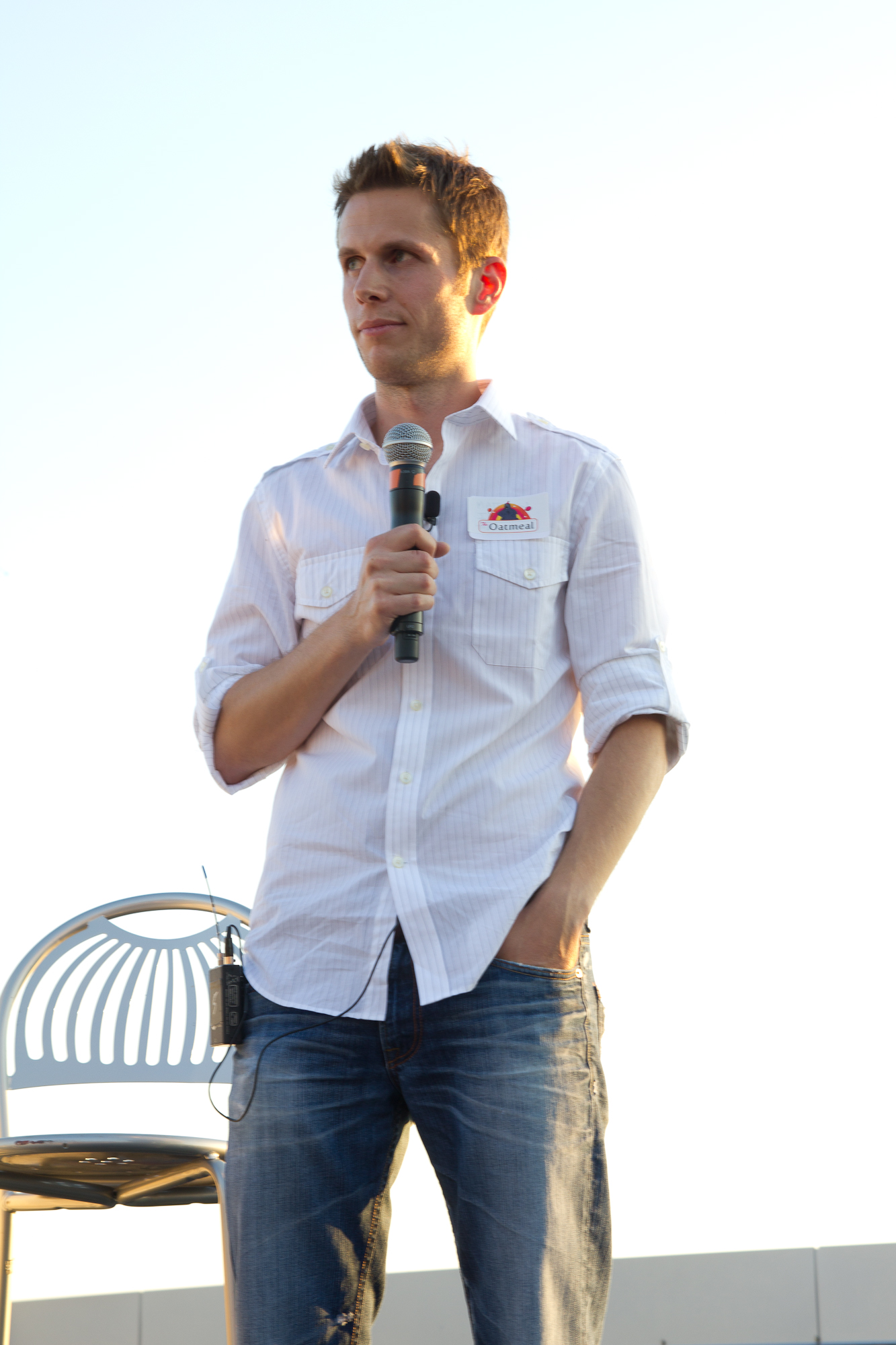
Matthew Inman, creator of The Oatmeal

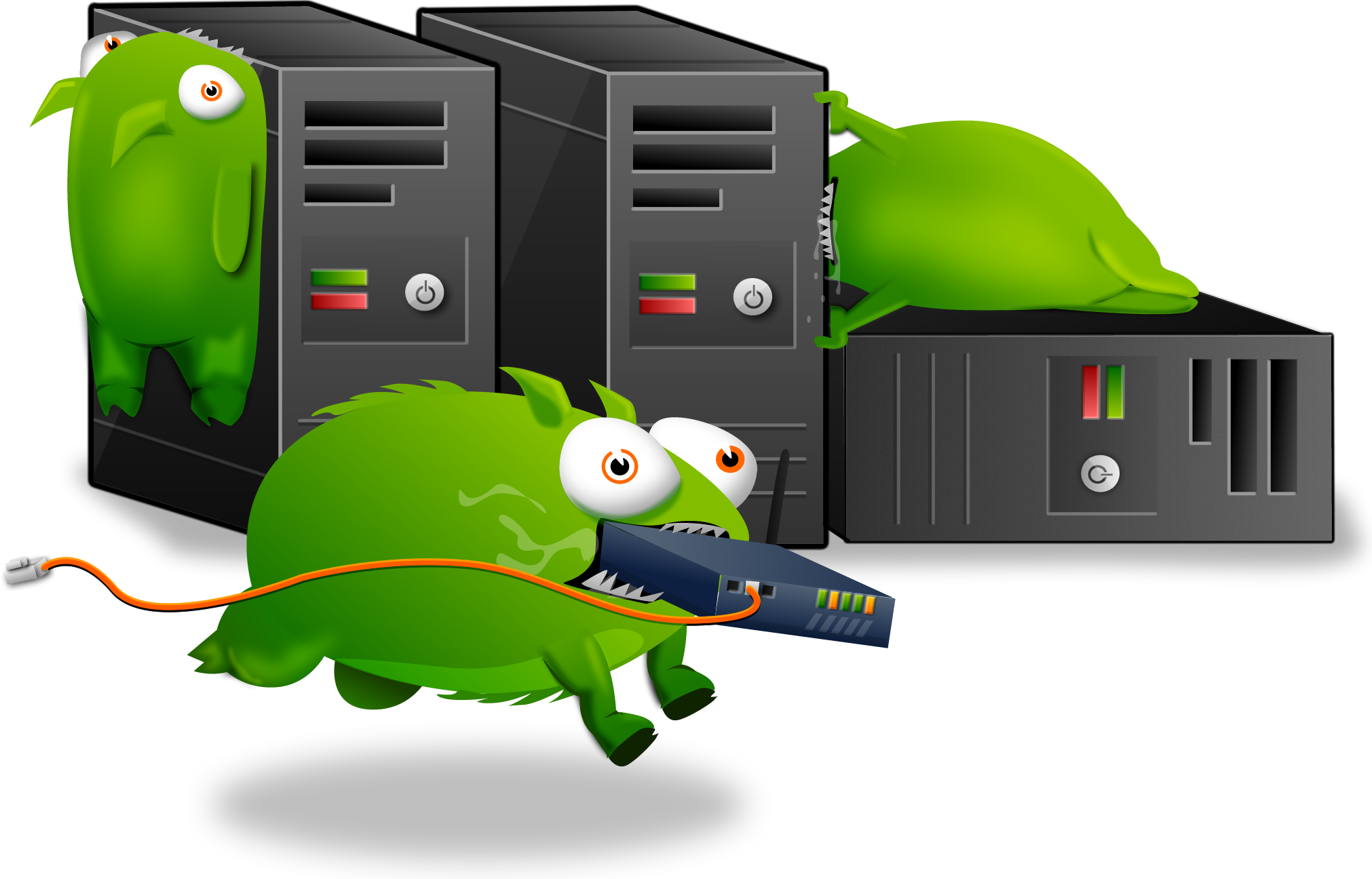
An example of Inman's artwork, the Tumbeasts were used by Tumblr.

=== Creation ===
Inman created The Oatmeal website in 2009. Early comics regularly made the front page of Digg, driving traffic to the site.

Inman said that when he started the comic, he felt that drawing was a chore. In a 2010 interview, he said that when thinking of a subject to write about, he simply picks something he is interested in. He usually worked at home, but as he finds it difficult to go long periods without social contact, he often goes to a coffee shop to work. Inman said that he found it is much easier to gain exposure for his work through the internet than it would have been two decades earlier. He added that he enjoys making people laugh, and although he can't actually see the reaction of others to his work, he still appreciates seeing the high number of page views that his website receives.

=== Content ===
The format of The Oatmeal has been described as "storytelling-meets-infographics" and as "a quirky and often crudely-drawn comic". The comics cover an eclectic range of topics: a 2010 article describes comics on being chained to a bunk bed with a velociraptor, evil scheming kittens, people being sodomized by Bigfoot, and babies that taste like nachos. Other themes are zombies, horse care and English grammar.

His first viral comic was "How to Tell if Your Cat is Plotting to Kill You", and other comics have titles such as "How to Use a Semicolon", "What it's Like to Own an Apple Product", "How the Male Angler Fish Gets Completely Screwed", "15-ish Things Worth Knowing About Coffee" and "How a Web Design Goes Straight to Hell."

One comic, "Why Nikola Tesla Was the Greatest Geek Who Ever Lived", was heavily critiqued by a writer for Forbes. In response Inman made a second post going through the Forbes article, acknowledging some good points but picking apart others, including calling multiple sections "bullshit" and defending his work as "a comedian [who speaks] in hyperbole."

In reaction to Tumblr's regular downtimes, Inman created the TumbleBeasts in 2010 as a parody of the Twitter Fail Whale, and urged Tumblr to use them. Tumblr added the artwork to their 404 page for some time, renaming them Tumbeasts.

=== Hiatus ===
In June 2019, just after the release of The Secret Life of Pets 2 – a feature animated film in which Inman was credited as creative consultant – Inman told the Washington Post that he "won't be regularly creating the Oatmeal much longer" and was planning a hiatus of around two years. Inman said that he loved The Oatmeal but "I'm just tired and it's been a decade of writing comics for strangers from my basement, and I want to try something different for a while." Around the same time, Inman signed a deal to develop an animated feature for Illumination Entertainment, though at that time the film did not appear to have been greenlit and no details were announced.

== Success ==
The Oatmeal received 300,000 visitors in its first month and within 10 months had received 4.5 million visitors. Inman said in 2010 that The Oatmeal received more than 20 million page views per month; as of 2012 the site received 4 million visitors a month.

Inman said in 2012 that The Oatmeal had a revenue of $500,000 a year. The Guardian considered the claim and found it reasonable given the site's visitor numbers. Fast Company described Inman in 2012 as a "millionaire".

Campaigns for related products have also been successful. A fundraiser to develop and produce a card game called Exploding Kittens raised $8.8 million, and a game company co-founded by Inman received a $30 million investment in 2019.

Inman appeared on an episode of Last Call with Carson Daly in 2010 and mentioned his web site.

=== Awards ===
The website was awarded the Eisner Award in the Best Digital/Webcomic category in 2014. In 2016, Inman received the Bob Clampett Humanitarian Award from San Diego Comic-Con, an award given "to people in comics and the popular arts who have worked to help others."

== Products and events ==
=== Books ===
As of 2019, Inman had released ten books, which collect material from the website and feature new material.

- 5 Very Good Reasons to Punch a Dolphin in the Mouth (And Other Useful Guides) (2011)
- How to Tell if Your Cat is Plotting to Kill You (2012)
- My Dog: The Paradox: A Lovable Discourse about Man's Best Friend (2013)
- Why Grizzly Bears Should Wear Underpants (2013)
- The Terrible and Wonderful Reasons I Run Long Distances (2014)
- 404 Not Found: A Coloring Book by The Oatmeal (2016)
- If My Dogs Were a Pair of Middle-Aged Men (2017)
- How to be Perfectly Unhappy (2017)
- Why My Cat is More Impressive Than Your Baby (2019)

At least one of The Oatmeal books was a New York Times Bestseller. How to Tell if Your Cat is Plotting to Kill You spent at least 20 weeks on the NYT bestseller list "Paperback Advice & Misc.", often at #1.

=== Merchandise ===
Revenue from The Oatmeal includes the sale of wall posters, greeting cards, calendars, clothing, coffee cups, signed prints, stickers, magnets, and badges.

=== Games ===
In January 2015, Inman, Elan Lee, and Shane Small launched a Kickstarter crowdfunding campaign for their project Exploding Kittens, a card-based, Russian-roulette-style game with art by Inman. The campaign raised $1 million in its first seven hours, and ultimately raised $8.8 million, becoming the most-funded card game on Kickstarter.

The success of the game prompted Lee and Inman to found a company in 2015, also named Exploding Kittens. Since then, the company Exploding Kittens has released five more games: Bears vs. Babies (2017), You've Got Crabs (2018), Throw Throw Burrito (2019), On a Scale of One to T-Rex (2019), and the mobile game Kitty Letter (2021). There is also merchandise of characters from the games.

In October 2019, it was announced that Peter Chernin, American businessman and the CEO of The Chernin Group (TCG), had invested $30 million for a minority stake in Exploding Kittens. Inman said that the funds will be used to mount a live gaming convention, Burning Cat; and to hire more artists and produce three to five new games a year.

=== Events ===
At the same time as announcing his fifth book, The Terrible and Wonderful Reasons I Run Long Distances, Inman announced "Beat the Blerch", an organized running race in 10 kilometer, half, and full marathon formats which was held in Carnation, Washington, on September 20 and 21, 2014. All 2,000 spots originally offered for the first race day were sold out in 20 minutes, prompting Inman to open a second day for more runners to enroll. The Beat the Blerch event took place every year from 2014 to 2019. In 2020, the event was cancelled due to the COVID-19 pandemic, but a "virtual race" was organized instead.

In June 2019, Exploding Kittens Inc. announced the planning of a live gaming convention. The two-day event was to take place in May 2020 in Portland, Oregon, U.S. It was named Burning Cat in reference to the Burning Man festival, and was to conclude with the burning of a large wooden statue of a cat in homage to Burning Man's burning of a human-shaped figure. Burning Cat was to feature appearances from guest speakers alongside a series of gaming and networking activities. The event was postponed until 2021, then indefinitely, due to the COVID-19 pandemic.

=== Television series ===
Exploding Kittens was being made into a Netflix series by Mike Judge and Greg Daniels. A teaser trailer was released on November 11, 2023, followed by a full trailer in May 2024. The series premiered in July 2024.

== Tesla Museum fundraiser ==
In August 2012, Inman launched a fundraising campaign on the crowdfunding website Indiegogo to support a nonprofit organization offering to purchase Wardenclyffe Tower in Shoreham on Long Island, New York. The organization, Tesla Science Center at Wardenclyffe, hoped to buy and restore the facility that was Nikola Tesla's last laboratory, preserving the site and creating a museum to Tesla. There was a sense of urgency, as apparently there was an offer from another party to buy the site for commercial use. Inman, a fan of Tesla, promoted the fundraiser with a blog post on The Oatmeal calling for people and companies to donate. The state of New York agreed to match donations up to $850,000.

The fundraiser raised $1,370,461 from over 33,000 backers, including Joseph Sikorski, director of the Tesla film Fragments From Olympus, and Elon Musk. With the grant from New York state, the campaign totaled over $2.1 million. After the fundraiser, Jane Alcron of the Tesla Science Centre said the additional funds would be used to start converting the ruins into a science center and perhaps building a replica of the original tower.

In May 2014, Inman produced a comic on The Oatmeal titled "What it's like to own a Tesla Model S - A cartoonist's review of his magical space car", and a follow-up comic titled "Part Two: Man Vs. Motor" in which he talked about Nikola Tesla, and Elon Musk, the CEO of Tesla Motors. After publishing the comic, he tweeted Musk, inviting Elon to donate to the Tesla Museum. At 2 a.m. the following day, Elon responded by tweet: "I would be happy to help". Musk then donated $1 million for the development and construction of the museum.

Inman is featured in Tower to the People, a 2015 documentary on Wardenclyffe by Joseph Sikorski.

== Legal disputes ==
=== FunnyJunk legal dispute ===
Inman alleged that FunnyJunk, a content aggregator website, repeatedly infringed The Oatmeal's original content. FunnyJunk alleged that those accusations were defamation and demanded $20,000 in damages. As a response to the demand, Inman set up a Indiegogo fundraiser to raise $20,000, but to give the money to the National Wildlife Federation and the American Cancer Society. The campaign raised $220,024 at completion. He stated he intended to take a photo of himself with the cash, then send the photograph along with a satirical illustration of FunnyJunk's mother "seducing a Kodiak bear" to FunnyJunk.

FunnyJunk's lawyer, Charles Carreon, attempted to shut the campaign down, alleging it violated Indiegogo's terms and conditions. Carreon also filed a pro se lawsuit Carreon v. Inman et al in United States District Court for the Northern District of California against Inman, Indiegogo, the American Cancer Society, and the National Wildlife Federation in response. On July 3, 2012, Carreon filed a notice of voluntary dismissal in his lawsuit against all parties without prejudice.

=== Oatmeal Studios trademark suit ===
On November 21, 2012, greeting card maker Oatmeal Studios sued Inman and Recycled Greetings for trademark infringement. Oatmeal Studios holds the trademark for their name and after The Oatmeal worked with another company to make greeting cards based on the comic, Oatmeal Studios argued that this was too similar and likely to cause confusion. On August 28, 2013, a Stipulation of Dismissal with prejudice was filed by Excelsior Printing Company, the litigants in the lawsuit, meaning that the two parties had settled the dispute.

== Author ==
The Oatmeal was created by Matthew Inman (born 1982 or 1983). Born in Chino, California, he moved with his family to the small, rural town of Hayden, Idaho, when he was in grade school. Hayden was in an ultra-conservative environment and Inman rebelled against those views.

Inman created websites for others from age 13, and he moved to Seattle at age 17 to work in technology. After some jobs for other companies, he created a dating website called "Mingle2", which became popular. He sold Mingle2 but stayed on with the new company, and wrote comics and quizzes to attract readers. Inman says this work was the inspiration for The Oatmeal.

Inman opposed the Stop Online Piracy Act (SOPA). He said that while the act would have afforded him more rights, he disliked like the way that SOPA would have put the onus on sites to prove their innocence. He joined a global day of action against the legislation.

Inman lives on Bainbridge Island in the Seattle area. He is a long-distance runner, including ultramarathons.
