= I Love Bees =

Alternate reality game

- The home page in March 2004, the starting point of the titular alternate reality game
- Website type: Alternate reality game
- Available in: English
- Creator: 42 Entertainment
- Website: www.ilovebees.co (mirror) www.ilovebees.com (original)
- Current status: Redirects to 42entertainment.com/work/ilovebees

I Love Bees (also known as ilovebees or ILB for short) was an alternate reality game (ARG) that served as a real-world experience and viral marketing campaign for the release of developer Bungie's 2004 video game Halo 2. The game was created and developed by 42 Entertainment. Many of the same personnel had previously created an ARG for the film A.I. titled The Beast. I Love Bees was commissioned by Microsoft, Halo 2's publisher and Bungie's ultimate parent company at the time.

I Love Bees was first advertised by a hidden message in a Halo 2 trailer; players who investigated the titular website discovered that the pages appeared to be hacked by a mysterious intelligence. As players solved puzzles, audio logs were posted to the ilovebees.com site which gradually revealed more of the fictional back-story, involving a marooned artificial intelligence stranded on Earth and its attempts to put itself back together.

250,000 people viewed the ilovebees website when it was launched in July 2004, and more than 500,000 returned to the site every time the pages were updated. More than three million visitors viewed the site over the course of three months, and thousands of people around the world participated in the game. I Love Bees won numerous awards for its innovation and helped spawn numerous other alternate reality games for video games.

== Overview ==
Alternate reality games or ARGs are designed to involve fans of video games or other media in a form of viral marketing which CNET described as encompassing "real-life treasure hunting, interactive storytelling, video games and online [communities]". I Love Bees began when jars of honey were received in the mail by people who had previously participated in alternate reality games. The jars contained letters leading to the I Love Bees website and a countdown. At around the same time, theatrical trailers for Halo 2 concluded with the Xbox logo and a URL, Xbox.com, that quickly flashed a link to ilovebees.com, ostensibly a hacked site related to beekeeping.

Both events, not connected publicly for several weeks, caused the curious to visit the website ilovebees.com. The site, which appeared to be dedicated to honey sales and beekeeping, was covered in confusing random characters and sentence fragments. Dana, the ostensible webmaster of the ilovebees site, created a weblog stating that something had gone wrong with her website, and the site itself had been hacked. Suspecting that this was a mystery that could be unraveled, Halo and ARG fans spread the link and began to work on figuring out what was going on.

The gameplay of I Love Bees tasked players around the world to work together to solve problems, with little or no direction or guidance. For example, the game presented players with 210 pairs of global positioning system coordinates and time codes, with no indications to what the locations referred to. Players eventually figured out the coordinates referred to pay phones and the times to when the phones would ring; one player in Florida stayed by a phone while Hurricane Frances was minutes away in order to recite answers to prerecorded questions. Other phone calls were made by a live person known as the "operator," voiced by veteran voice actor Kristen Rutherford; these calls allowed players to interact with the characters of the games in spontaneous and occasionally humorous ways. Other players treated the corrupted data on ilovebees.com as encrypted files to decipher, or used image files found on the web server to solve puzzles. After players completed certain tasks, they were rewarded with new installments to an audio drama which revealed the reasons for the ilovebees.com malfunction.

Over time, the game's mechanisms for contacting players grew more complex. Players were sent messages via email, called on their cell phones, and travelled to arranged meetings between players and characters. The game culminated by inviting players of the game to visit one of four cinemas where they could get a chance to play Halo 2 before its release and collect a commemorative DVD.

== Plot ==
The game's plot begins with a military spaceship crashing to Earth in an unknown location, leaving the craft's controlling artificial intelligence (AI) damaged. This AI, known as the "Operator" or "Melissa", is not alone; other AI programs share its system. In an effort to survive and contact any surviving allies, Melissa transfers herself to a San Francisco-area web server, which happens to host a bee enthusiast website known as I Love Bees. To the distress of Dana Awbrey, the website's maintainer, Melissa's attempts to send signals began to appear largely as codes, hidden in images or other text, interfering with the operation of the I Love Bees site and corrupting much of the content.

Dana, attempting to regain control over the corrupted website, accidentally erases data which comprises part of Melissa's memory. Furious, Melissa lashes out at the webmaster, obtaining pictures of her using the webcam on her computer and promising to take revenge. Alarmed, Dana announces that she is removing herself from the situation and is taking a previously planned trip to China earlier than expected.

All AI units contain a program called SPDR, short for System Peril Distributed Reflex. As SPDR attempts to fix Melissa, random dumps from Melissa's memory began to spill into the website, largely detailing Melissa's history and revealing the presence of a malicious Trojan-horse virus known as the "Pious Flea." The Spider tries to erase the Flea but is outwitted, as Melissa erases the Spider instead of the Flea. The Flea continues to overwrite Melissa's programming with its own mysterious goals, with it eventually being revealed that it is actually an espionage AI more properly called the Seeker, built by the Covenant.

With the assistance of other characters revealed by audio chapters, the fictional protagonists break into a secure military installation and manage to deactivate a Forerunner device which is implied to begin the firing sequence of the Halo installations. However, the price paid for the deactivation is a powerful energy transmission alerting the Covenant to the location of Earth. Whole again, Melissa sees how she has been manipulated by the Pious Flea, and returns to her time. I Love Bees ends with the Covenant invading Earth, corresponding to a major plot point in Halo 2.

Due to Bungie's commitment to the development of Halo 2 during I Love Bees' run, they were unable to assist 42 Entertainment with story creation, and so the ARG's story is only tangentially related to the main Halo storyline. The events of I Love Bees were, therefore, originally not considered to be Halo canon. In a 2006 interview, however, Bungie's content manager Frank O'Connor expressly confirmed that I Love Bees is part of "things that we embrace as canon." References to elements of I Love Bees have since appeared in The Halo Graphic Novel (2006) and the 2009 Halo Encyclopedia, both of which are official canon.

== Development ==
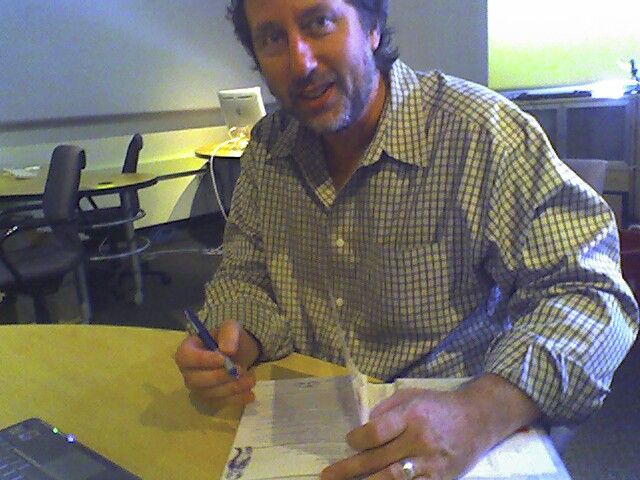
Jordan Weisman, CEO of 42 Entertainment

I Love Bees' developer, 42 Entertainment, was founded by Jordan Weisman, the former creative director for Microsoft's Xbox division. 42 Entertainment had previously created the first ARG, The Beast, which had been used to promote the movie A.I.. Other members of the I Love Bees team included Sean Stewart, a World Fantasy Award-award-winning author who served as I Love Bees' writer, and Jim Stewartson, I Love Bees' technical lead who produced the first commercial 3D game delivered by the internet. Weisman stated that the goal of I Love Bees was to utilize every person who interacted with the game, and to use any electronic resource to do so: "If we could make your toaster print something we would. Anything with an electric current running through it. A single story, a single gaming experience, with no boundaries. A game that is life itself."

42 Entertainment conceived I Love Bees as a radio drama, and used the pay phones as a way to excite players. Chris Di Cesare, Microsoft's director of marketing, stated that the radio drama's similarities with War of the Worlds was intentional, and that "[ILB] remains true to the radio drama tradition of Orson Welles that we were shooting for and also allowed us to tell the story in an unorthodox way." In order to prevent non-players from being scared by the sounds of gunfire from the pay phones, 42 Entertainment established passwords that had to be repeated. Stewart described writing for the game as more enjoyable than writing printed fiction, both for the money and the unique experience of ARGs as opposed to other media:

The audiences that we built for those campaigns are having a different experience. They're having a collective experience in which they literally bring different pieces, one to the next, swap them back and forth, gossip about them. They have an element of cocreation and a collaborative nature that doesn't really have an analog that I've been able to think of in the arts.

== Reception ==
I Love Bees is credited with helping drive attention to Halo 2; former Electronic Gaming Monthly editor Dan Hsu stated in an interview that "I Love Bees really got existing gamers and other consumers talking about the universe of [Halo]." Billy Pidgeon, a game analyst, noted that I Love Bees achieved what it had been designed to do: "This kind of viral guerrilla marketing worked ... Everyone started instant messaging about it and checking out the site." I Love Bees not only received coverage from gaming publications, but attracted mainstream press attention as well. At its height, ilovebees received between two and three million unique visitors over the course of three months. 9,000 people also actively participated in the real-world aspects of the game. The players of I Love Bees themselves were quite varied. The target demographic for the promotion was younger males, but one player noted that even middle-aged men and women were engaged in the game.

I Love Bees received several awards for its innovation. The design team was one of the recipients of the Innovation Award at the 5th annual Game Developers Choice Awards. I Love Bees was also announced as the winner of a Webby Award in the Game-Related category, presented by the International Academy of Digital Arts and Sciences.

=== Legacy ===
Along with 42 Entertainment's previous ARG known as The Beast, I Love Bees is credited with bringing greater attention to the fledgling marketing form; I Love Bees not only helped assuage fears by marketers about the costs of ARG failure, but attracted interest from other game developers in using alternate reality games to promote their own products. Before I Love Bees, The Guardian stated that "ARGs were destined to join Letsbuyit.com and Barcode Battlers in the e-dustbin of nice ideas that never really caught on"; the explosion of broadband internet access and a renewed interest in codes allowed I Love Bees to become wildly successful. Bungie would later use another ARG called "Iris" to promote Halo 2's sequel, Halo 3.

I Love Bees also attracted attention in the wider discussion of user-based marketing and cooperation. Author Charles Leadbeater argued that I Love Bees was an example of "We-Think" collective thinking; Leadbeater noted that after the "puppet masters" began the game, I Love Bees "displayed all the characteristics of a mass movement, propelled into existence in a matter of weeks simply by collective enthusiasm guided by a few cyberspace 'avatars'". The game proved successful with gamers, as well as attracting nontraditional players who had no experience with Halo before joining the game.

In a 2016 Bandcamp interview, artist Ramona Andra Xavier, known for pioneering the Vaporwave musical genre under the pseudonym Vektroid (among others), claimed to be acutely influenced by "I Love Bees," in its use of "hacked" websites, internet communities and IRL tasks to blur the lines between reality and fiction.

== See also ==
- Iris, Bungie's Halo 3 ARG
- Radio drama — the genre of the audio files released as part of I Love Bees.
