= Halo: Contact Harvest =

2007 novel by Joseph Staten

- Author: Joseph Staten
- Language: English
- Series: Halo
- Genre: Military science fiction
- Published: October 30, 2007 (Tor)
- Publication place: United States
- Media type: Print (Paperback)
- Pages: 396
- ISBN: 978-0-7653-1569-4
- OCLC: 148729299
- Preceded by: Halo: Ghosts of Onyx
- Followed by: Halo: The Cole Protocol

Halo: Contact Harvest is a military science fiction novel by Joseph Staten. Released in October 2007, it is the fifth novel based on the Halo video game franchise. Staten was a longtime employee of Bungie, the developer of the Halo video game series; he directed the cut scenes in the video games and is a major contributor to Halo's storyline. He set out to write a novel that appealed to gamers, as well as those who had never read a Halo novel.

Set in 2525, twenty-seven years before the events of Halo: Combat Evolved, the novel tells the story of the United Nations Space Command's first encounter with the alien collective known as the Covenant on the colony world of Harvest, and the beginning of the long war that follows. The novel is an ensemble piece, following human and alien characters. The protagonist is a young Marine, Staff Sergeant Avery Johnson, who also appears in the Halo video games. Upon release, the book was generally well received and became a New York Times bestseller in its first week. Critics pointed to the novel's success as a sign of the increasing importance of story in video games.

== Background ==
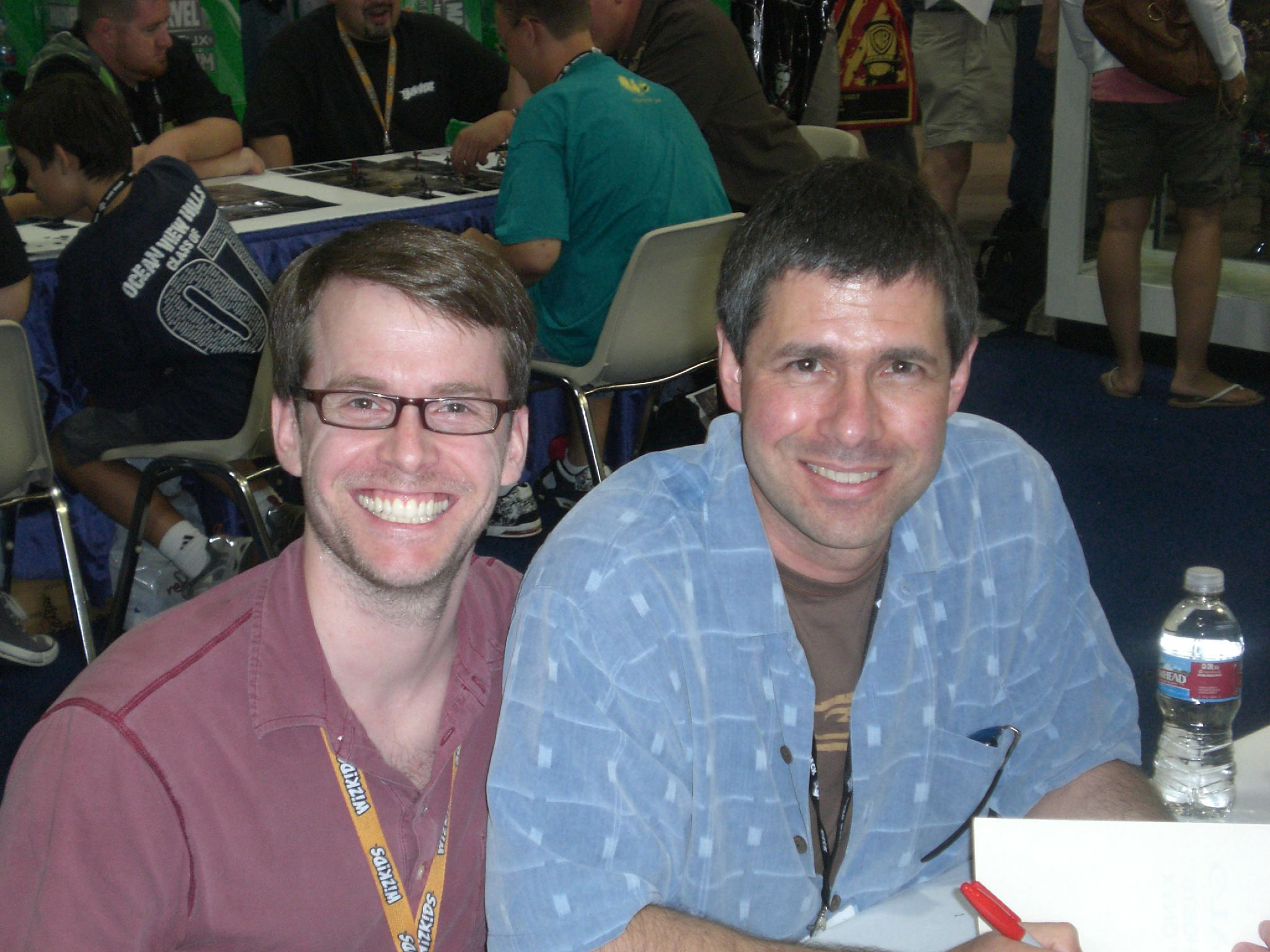
Staten (left) and fellow Halo author Eric Nylund promoted Contact Harvest at San Diego Comic-Con in 2007, giving away posters of the book's cover.

The four previous novels in the Halo franchise—The Fall of Reach, The Flood, Halo: First Strike, and Ghosts of Onyx—were written by freelance writers Eric Nylund or William C. Dietz. Halo publisher Tor Books asked Halo's developer, Bungie, if they had someone in-house suited to writing the next novel. Joseph Staten, a Bungie employee since 1998 who had written much of the Halo series canon, was the obvious choice. The author found that the book was the perfect way to elaborate on the Halo story without stripping it down for a video game: "I always felt we shortchanged [the player]. We don't have a lot of time to tell story while the bullets are flying." Staten considered the novel the perfect way to do the character of Sergeant Johnson – who was one-dimensional in the games – proper justice as a well-rounded character. Replying to G4TV's question about writing action, Staten replied that he felt that writing "involves slowing things down", in comparison to a game of Halo. The author also said that the work of his favorite science-fiction authors helped teach him the importance of honing a "strong, consistent voice".

Originally, the novel was due to ship before the September 25 release of Halo 3; Staten stated that due to his involvement with both projects, the novel slipped behind. He also emphasized that he hoped Contact Harvest was a good novel, not just a good Halo novel; "... someone who isn't a Halo fan – someone who hasn't read any of the previous novels – will be able to pick up Contact Harvest and enjoy the read".

This focus on accuracy was a challenge for Staten, as he believes his audience is highly intelligent, willing, and able to report flaws; fellow Bungie employees cross-referenced his drafts with the "Halo Story Bible" to ensure canonical agreement. One example of fans taking Staten to task over the novel occurred soon after the novel's cover was revealed in July 2007. The cover depicts the protagonist, Sergeant Avery Johnson holding a weapon known as the Battle Rifle. As the weapon was first introduced in the video game Halo 2 and the events of Contact Harvest take place decades before the game, fans were quick to say that Staten had made a mistake. Staten later pointed out he had good reasons for including the offending weapon in the book, and justified the inclusion by stating that the weapon is a prototypical form of the version players use in the game.

== Plot ==
Contact Harvest takes place in the year 2524 in the Halo universe, where faster-than-light technology has allowed humanity to spread across the galaxy. The novel is an ensemble piece, with the action being narrated from human and alien Covenant viewpoints. After noticing the disappearances of ships around the remote agricultural colony Harvest, The United Nations Space Command sends Staff Sergeants Avery Johnson and Nolan Byrne to Harvest to raise a militia. The disappearances are revealed to be alien Kig-Yar vessels intercepting the ships in their search for relics left by the Forerunners, an ancient race sacred to the Kig-Yar and other members of the Covenant. Members of the vessel are shocked to discover that their instruments indicates hundreds of thousands of Forerunner relics on Harvest. Setting a trap for the hijackers, Johnson and Byrne engage the Covenant in combat. Another Covenant ship arrives, this one crewed by Jiralhanae. These troops, led by their chieftain Maccabeus, have been ordered to confirm the presence of the relics; despite the reservations of his nephew, Tartarus, Maccabeus agrees to parley with the humans on Harvest to secure the Forerunner relics. In the midst of the meeting in Harvest's gardens, the Covenant begin a firefight and peace talks are shattered.

On the Covenant holy city of High Charity, two San 'Shyuum, the Minister of Fortitude and the Vice-Minister of Tranquility, plot to take the place of the three Prophet Hierarchs currently leading the Covenant. They visit the Philologist for blessings and advice. As Tranquility and Fortitude are meeting with the Philologist, the "Oracle", a Forerunner artificial intelligence named Mendicant Bias, awakens from dormancy. Mendicant Bias informs the San 'Shyuum that the "Forerunner artifacts" found at Harvest are actually the humans themselves, meaning that the Covenant's central teachings are false. The Minister of Fortitude realizes that the truth must never be revealed, lest the Covenant be torn apart.

Back on Harvest, Johnson and his militia continue to resist the Covenant attack. Maccabeus is ordered to bombard the planet from space, but disobeys and launches a ground assault in an effort to recover the relics. Johnson and his team board an orbital platform to evacuate Harvest's population. Tartarus challenges Maccabeus for control of the Jiralhanae pack, killing his uncle and becoming the next leader. The human civilians and survivors of Harvest successfully evacuate the planet, while on High Charity, the Minister of Fortitude, Tranquility, and The Philologist become the new Prophet Hierarchs, and announce a war against humanity to suppress the truth they have learned.

== Reception ==
Upon release, Contact Harvest debuted at #3 on The New York Times Best Sellers list. The novel simultaneously appeared on the USA Today and Publishers Weekly bestsellers' lists. Reviewers noted that despite being an unproven writer, Staten had succeeded in crafting an excellent novel; complaints included the perceived overly descriptive prose and use of military jargon. Will Tuttel of Gamespy.com said that the novel's success made sense because video games are increasingly about the story. A ten-CD audiobook was later released, featuring the voices of Holter Graham and Jen Taylor; Publishers Weekly enjoyed Graham's performance, but felt Taylor's over-emphasis and dialects detracted from the tension of the novel.

Contact Harvest's success was surprising to some. On January 8, 2008, National Public Radio's All Things Considered segment ran a story in which reporter Chana Joffe asked Staten if gamers read and acted surprised that Halo had a story at all. Several writers covering the story believed that the All Things Considered piece was biased against gamers and insulting. Scott Siegel of Joystiq criticized Joffe for taking "unfair jabs at video game fans".
