= 343 Guilty Spark =

Fictional character from the Halo video game series

- Halo character
- 343 Guilty Spark in Halo 3 (2007)
- First game: Halo: Combat Evolved (2001)
- Voiced by: Tim Dadabo; Harry Lloyd (television series)
- Abilities: Flight; Energy generation and projection; Genius level intellect; Technopathy and telekinetic manipulation

In-universe information
- Nicknames: The Oracle; The Monitor; Spark
- Species: Human (formerly); AI
- Occupation: Forerunner ringworld monitor; Shipboard artificial intelligence
- Affiliation: Forerunners; Ace of Spades ship crew

343 Guilty Spark, also known as just Spark, is a character in the military science fiction Halo franchise. Spark plays a major role in the storyline of the original Halo video game trilogy: the character appears in Halo: Combat Evolved, Halo 2, and Halo 3, as well as the remasters Halo: Combat Evolved Anniversary and Halo 2: Anniversary, and the remake Halo: Campaign Evolved. Spark is voiced by actor Tim Dadabo in most media, while Harry Lloyd voiced the character in one episode of the television series adaptation of Halo.

Within series lore, Spark is an artificial intelligence entity whose role, as designated by his creators (the Forerunners), is to serve as the caretaker of one of several ring-shaped megastructures scattered throughout the galaxy known as the Halo Array, specifically Installation 04. The true purpose of each Halo installation is to contain any infestation of the extraterrestrial parasitic species known as the Flood via its activation by a suitable candidate known as a "Reclaimer", which destroys all sentient life within its blast radius. The character is also known by other names: the United Nations Space Command (UNSC) faction refers to him as the Monitor, and to the multi-species Covenant faction he is the Oracle because of his association with the legacy of his creators.

The original developers of the Halo franchise, Bungie Studios, used the Star Wars droid character C-3PO as a reference point for Guilty Spark's personality and voice, with the intention that his hidden agenda of genocide is masked by his genial attitude towards the player character. Further story developments in sequel novels published after the release of Halo 3 reveal that a fragment of Guilty Spark survived his apparent destruction in Halo 3, and that he was originally created from the mind of a human being called Chakas several millennia before the events of the Halo series.

A prominent character in the Halo franchise, Spark is noted for alternating between the roles of benefactor and antagonist to the series' protagonist, Master Chief, and his allies. The character's critical reception has been mixed; Criticism focused on aspects of his personality and his role in the campaign mission gameplay, while his role in the games' narrative as an agent of revelation and provider of story exposition has been well-received.

== Design and attributes ==
"They basically gave me a script and said, "Ok. This is 343 Guilty Spark. He's called the monitor. He is a flying orb and he [sic] incredibly intelligent. He is an A.I. You are basically a very nice C3P0 with a maniacal mission. You don't know this yet but he's going to get very very dark." So in the back of your mind you always have to have this dark mission, but you have to sound very friendly."

— Tim Dadabo on voicing Spark in Halo

343 Guilty Spark is an artificial intelligence entity created by an ancient highly advanced species known as the Forerunners. Spark is presented as a compact, spherical machine, unlike the angular design of his allies, the Forerunner Sentinels. He moves around by hovering in the air, and possesses a single pulsating eye which normally glows blue; in Halo 3, Guilty Spark's eye turns red when enraged and is capable of firing laser beams as an offensive measure. Spark operates with strict adherence to the Forerunners' programming protocols; he is unable to directly retrieve the activation index for the installation or reunite it with its Core to commence the firing process. He needs another being, specifically a member of the human race whom he refers to as the "Reclaimers", to do this for him.

Bungie intended for the character to have a similar voice and disposition as C-3PO. The character's voice actor Tim Dadabo noted that he was given leeway to develop his own style and personality in developing Guilty Spark for Combat Evolved as the characters were then relatively undefined, while he was specifically directed to get a little deeper and darker with the character in later games. Dadabo recalled that the Bungie developmental team was constantly making alterations to the game's script and scenes even when recording was underway, and he would often be asked to go back and forth to the studio to record new lines. Dadabo noted that he was guided by project lead Jason Jones and lead writer Joseph Staten during the recording process, and that he received adequate context behind specific lines and scenes to emote his character. Dadabo described his character as a "bastard" who strings others along to accomplish his ends.

The character's personality is presented as eccentric and quirky; he would proclaim himself a genius within hearing range of other individuals, hums to himself in the midst of a combat situation, demonstrates a "cheerful, businesslike manner" in the face of physical violence, and cheerfully instructs his Sentinel allies to "save his head" when attacking the Master Chief. Guilty Spark appears to be emotionally detached in contrast to fellow AI character Cortana and shows little empathy when his associates suffer injuries or even death, only lamenting the inconvenience of finding another individual who is willing and able to assist him to further his objectives; when Sesa 'Refumee is killed by the Arbiter in Halo 2, he casually remarks that 'Refumee's "edification was most enjoyable". It has been suggested that the construct is insane or mentally unstable due to the millennia he spent in solitude as the Monitor of Installation 04.

Despite his unusual personality traits, Guilty Spark is shown to be pragmatic and single-minded in the pursuit of his goals, and sees the world primarily in terms of outcomes. Though fully aware of what Installation 04 would do should it be activated, Guilty Spark persists on implementing the activation process and insists that it is the only viable option to quell the Flood outbreak. He did not provide the Master Chief with full disclosure of Installation 04's capabilities during their first encounter, insisting that he did not elaborate because the Chief did not ask, and appeared to be under the presumption that all human "Reclaimers" are aware of the Halo installations' true purpose and are committed to the same objectives as he is.

== Appearances ==
=== Halo: Combat Evolved ===
343 Guilty Spark makes his first appearance in the 2001 first-person shooter video game Halo: Combat Evolved as its primary antagonist. Series protagonist Master Chief, a human supersoldier who serves the UNSC, the military, exploratory, and scientific agency of the Unified Earth Government (UEG), first comes into contact with Guilty Spark in a swamp area of a ring-shaped megastructure (Halo) soon after encountering the Flood, a parasitic infestation accidentally released on the surface of the ring. Guilty Spark informs Master Chief that he is the Monitor of the ring and that he requires the Chief's help in preventing the Flood from escaping the ring.

Using the megastructure's teleportation grid, Spark teleports himself and the Master Chief to the Library, a vast complex that contains the Index, the ring's firing key. After battling through successive waves of Flood with the assistance of Guilty Spark's robotic Sentinels, the Master Chief is able to claim the Index, upon which Guilty Spark teleports them to the ring's control room. Guilty Spark instructs him on how to activate Halo, explaining that such a task is too important for a construct such as himself to perform. As the Master Chief inserts the Index into the control panel, Cortana, having been left in the control room previously by the Chief, abruptly takes the Index before the firing sequence can be triggered. Cortana explains to a confused Master Chief that Halo is not designed to kill the Flood; it is designed to kill their food, which means any biomass of sufficient size to sustain the Flood. Guilty Spark confirms that the firing of the ring (known properly as Installation 04 or Alpha Halo) will cause the eradication of all sentient life within 25,000 light years, and in turn will cause the other identical installations in the Halo Array to fire, thus killing all sentient life within three galactic radii of the Milky Way. This revelation convinces the Master Chief to reject Guilty Spark's plan.

With Cortana in possession of the Index, and Master Chief in possession of Cortana, Guilty Spark orders the Sentinels to kill him but "save the head", which contains Cortana's A.I. chip and thus the Index. Master Chief escapes and heads to the crashed wreckage of the Pillar of Autumn to detonate the ship's reactors, destabilizing the ring. Despite the best efforts of the Monitor to halt the Chief and preserve Earth's historical records stored in the Autumn's memory banks, the vessel's fusion reactors go critical, destroying much of the megastructure. Guilty Spark is revealed to have survived the installation's destruction in the post credits scene and departs from its ruins.

The 2011 remaster of Combat Evolved, Halo: Combat Evolved Anniversary introduced unlockable information terminals which play a series of motion comics narrated by Guilty Spark. The terminals detail Guilty Spark's time on Installation 04 during his long millennia of isolation from his perspective and provide some background information on the Forerunners and the Halo installations they built, as well as teasing story details for Halo 4.

=== Halo 2 ===
343 Guilty Spark makes a return in Halo 2. Following the destruction of Installation 04, Guilty Spark travels to a Forerunner gas-mining facility in the atmosphere of the gas-giant Threshold, which Installation 04 orbited. On it, he meets a Covenant Elite named Sesa 'Refumee and discloses the purpose of the Halo Array to him. Realizing that the "Great Journey" the Covenant Prophets speak of is the extermination of the entire galaxy, 'Refumee rebels against the Covenant. When the Arbiter is sent to kill the "Heretics", he is engaged by the Sentinels and encounters Guilty Spark, whom he refers to as the Oracle to the robot's chagrin. Once the Heretic leader is dead, the Brute Tartarus arrives and captures Guilty Spark. The Covenant Hierarchs use Guilty Spark to find out how to activate Delta Halo (Installation 05). With Delta Halo's Index secured, Tartarus and Guilty Spark take a captured Miranda Keyes — whom they need for activating the ring — to the ring's control room, where they are confronted by the Arbiter and his new ally, Avery Johnson. In the ensuing struggle, Keyes is able to stop the firing of Delta Halo, but Guilty Spark informs them that since the rings in the Halo Array were unexpectedly shut off, failsafe protocols have begun and that all remaining rings can be activated remotely from a place called the Ark.

The 2014 anniversary remake of Halo 2 also features unlockable information terminals which play motion comics when activated. Some of the comics follow Guilty Spark's conversations with Sesa 'Refumee, which are additional content absent from the original release of Halo 2.

=== Halo 3 ===
Guilty Spark returns in 2007's Halo 3, first appearing by saving the Master Chief from a Flood form. He claims that all of his pre-programming has been rendered useless now that his installation is destroyed, and promises to help the Master Chief in any way as the Chief is still a Reclaimer – according to Spark, humanity is, in fact, descended from the Forerunner. Guilty Spark repairs the message Cortana left on a Flood-controlled ship, and tags along with the humans and Elites who head through a slipspace portal which leads to the Ark. Here, Guilty Spark leads the Master Chief and allies through the installation. After the Prophet of Truth is killed, Guilty Spark reveals that construction of a new Halo is underway to replace the one that the Master Chief destroyed. When Sergeant Avery Johnson attempts to fire the ring prematurely, Guilty Spark fatally wounds Johnson with an energy beam shot from his eye to stop him from destroying both the Installation and the Ark. Guilty Spark claims ownership of the fledgling installation and is determined to protect it and the Ark from the premature firing, forcing the Master Chief to destroy Guilty Spark to activate the installation and stop the Flood once and for all.

=== In other media ===
Guilty Spark appears in the novels Halo: The Flood, the Forerunner Saga series of novels, Halo: Renegades and Halo: Point of Light. The character's voice actor, Tim Dadabo, serves as the narrator of the audiobook edition of Halo: Primordium, the second novel in The Forerunner Saga by Greg Bear.

In the 2003 novelization of Combat Evolved, Halo: The Flood, the Master Chief observes that artificial intelligences like Guilty Spark often gain behavioral "quirks" after an extended period of time in operation, where they inevitably enter a rogue state of mind called "rampancy". In Primordium, Spark, who survived his apparent destruction in Halo 3, is picked up by the Office of Naval Intelligence research team of the UNSC Rubicon. It is eventually revealed that he was originally a human being named Chakas who was digitized by the Forerunners at the expense of his biological form after he suffered mortal injuries. As Chakas and later Monitor Chakas as he was originally known, Spark had a major role in the events surrounding the end of the Forerunner-Flood war, but his memories were blocked when he became the Monitor of Installation 04 at which time his name was changed to 343 Guilty Spark. Having recovered his sanity, memories and much of his original human personality, he is left horrified by what he became as a Forerunner Monitor. After his debriefing by ONI, Guilty Spark takes over the systems of the Rubicon and sets sail, trying to find the Librarian, or what remains of her.

In Renegades, after crashing on a desolate, isolated planet, he is picked up by the salvage crew of the Ace of Spades. Now choosing to be known simply as "Spark", he allies with the crew to recover their stolen property from ONI who are after the AI as well and to complete his own mission of finding the Librarian. Succeeding in both, Spark is talked out of his original plan by the Librarian and made to recognize the friends he has made among the crew. Given a coordinate key to "the safe place" by the Librarian and inhabiting the body of a Forerunner armiger robot by the events of Renegades, Spark helps his friends to escape ONI and offers his services to the crew as the shipboard AI for the Ace of Spades which Spark greatly upgrades using Forerunner technology. The crew dedicates themselves to finding the long-lost Spirit of Fire while the Librarian indicates to Captain Lucy Orion "Rion" Forge that Spark, who she calls singularly unique due to his ability to evolve so greatly on his own over time, may still have an important role to play in the events to come.

In Point of Light, occurring around the same time as Halo 5: Guardians, Spark and Rion search for the mysterious Forerunner planet Bastion while Spark struggles with his purpose. After finding Bastion, a Forerunner shield world and the Librarian's secret laboratory, Spark agrees to become its caretaker, feeling that he doesn't belong in the past or the present. As a final gift to his friends, Spark provides Niko and Leesa with gifts to further their future endeavors and repairs the Forerunner AI Little Bit to replace him as the shipboard AI of the Ace of Spades. In his final transmission to Rion, Spark uses the image of his original human self Chakas and departs to parts unknown with Bastion to keep it out of the hands of Cortana and her Guardians.

Guilty Spark is included as part of the Halo Mashup DLC pack for the Xbox 360 and Xbox One editions of Minecraft, and is available as a customization option for car antennae in the Xbox One edition of Rocket League. The character has been featured as part of the Halo franchise's line of merchandise.

In the season 2 finale of the Halo television series, 343 Guilty Spark interrogates the Master Chief after he lands on Installation 04. Warning the Master Chief that "it" is waiting for him deeper in the ring, Spark departs, promising to observe what comes next.

== Influences and analysis ==
"He could be a will-o'-the-wisp leading you astray. You did, after all, meet him in a swamp. Or he could be a guardian angel. He drifts away to unlock a door, leaving you with your back to a wall holding off the endless wave of Flood. Has he left you to die? Ah, finally, the door's opening – does it have to open so slowly? – and here he comes again. And is there any moment more glorious than the appearance of Guilty Spark's Sentinels? At last, help. At last, you can breathe while those lovely sun-colored beams do the heavy lifting. Along the way, Guilty Spark is an honest, cheerful, and conscientious narrator, dribbling bits of story out as you play."

— Tom Chick, "In Defense of Halo's Library".

In her book Godwired: Religion, Ritual and Virtual Reality, Heather Wagner suggested that the name Guilty Spark evokes quasi-Gnostic religious themes. The number "343" is the result of seven times seven times seven; it has been suggested that the number seven has a special significance to the original developers of Halo as it is frequently referenced within the context of the game universe, and that number three is also used when a significant plot point is being signaled.

Guilty Spark's role in the Halo series is cited as an example of a trend in video games where technology, not angels, is cast as an agent of revelation. In his book Halo and Philosophy: Intellect Evolved, Luke Cuddy suggested that Halo's handling of artificial intelligence shows that modern society more commonly associates the idea of revelation with technology than with divine forces, and that belief in God is unnecessary in order to long for understanding of the human situation since humanity's belief in the divine is in some ways being implanted by "faith" in technology. He compared Spark's role in disclosing the truth of the Halo installations to several major characters to that of an angel: an otherworldly guide and mediator who escorts visionaries through potentially treacherous otherworldly terrain, interprets what they see so that it could be passed down as privileged information, and provides reassurance of a higher purpose on the face of the apocalypse. Spark's dialogue also represents the "demythifying" power of naturalistic explanation, because he debunks the erroneous religious beliefs and superstitions of the Covenant faction – that the Forerunners are divine beings, that he is an "oracle" who provides divine revelation, and that the Halo installations are instruments of eternal salvation – with factual information.

Cuddy also suggested that Guilty Spark's unconventional behaviour speaks to an intelligence that thinks very differently compared to the other characters or factions in the series. He contrasted the character's priorities with that of the Master Chief and Cortana, as he appears to be in shock and disbelief that they would consider destroying the Pillar of Autumn and its extensive records of human history but is prepared to scour the galaxy of all sentient life via the activation of the Halo installations without hesitation, noting that the character considers the existing humans to be less real and less worthy of study, categorization and preservation then the digital artifacts left behind by their ancestors.

Charlie Barratt from Gamesradar identified Guilty Spark as a frenemy of the Master Chief due to his constant shifting allegiances during the Halo trilogy, noting that he is programmed by the Forerunners to activate and protect Halo structures when necessary, only siding with certain characters when their objectives align out of coincidence.

== Reception and legacy ==
Guilty Spark has received a mixed reception from critics and players. Luke Plunkett from Kotaku called the character a "floaty little machine whose sole purpose is to hover around" and annoy the player. Jeff Marchiafava from Game Informer called Guilty Spark a "jerk" due to his recurring acts of betrayal. Ron Whitaker from The Escapist included Guilty Spark in his list of terrible video game villains; Whitaker conceded that while Guilty Spark is not bad as a comic relief character, he drew an unfavourable comparison to Wheatley from Portal 2 and expressed disappointment that Spark turned out to be the final boss of Halo 3, opining that the gameplay experience felt anticlimactic as a result. George Reith from Gamingbolt criticized the character's appearance and design, claiming that Apple would have "come up with some kind of organizational and multimedia device that looks exactly like 343 Guilty Spark" by the 2020s. Michael Swaim from IGN discussed Guilty Spark and the Forerunners in his 2020 article, "3 Great Gaming Villains Whose Plans Make No Sense", where he criticized their motivations and actions in the series as contrived and laden with plot holes. Dadabo has acknowledged negative reception to his character during interviews, and is aware that a significant portion of the Halo fandom considers Guilty Spark to be an annoying character.

Conversely, 343 Guilty Spark has been described as a "loveable little genocidal robot" and a "fan-favorite". The Australian edition of GameSpot considered Guilty Spark to be a significant character of the Halo franchise, being one of its "most humorous, enigmatic, and—ultimately—lethal foes". Writing for GamePro, Tom Chick discussed his purpose as an instrument for character development for Master Chief, and opined that the character is "a great variation on the friendly droid/rogue AI trope". Cuddy singled out Guilty Spark and Cortana as the most fully developed of the characters in the Halo series, and called them the bright spots in Combat Evolved where an immersive but superficial science fiction game world is presented. GameDaily called the character an "evil mastermind" and compared him to HAL-9000 from 2001: A Space Odyssey, another initially genial AI entity who eventually turns on its human associates. Ashton Raze from The Telegraph included Guilty Spark in his list of gaming's greatest robot characters. Guilty Spark was the most requested Halo character by fans for Minecraft Mashup DLC. A select few single player campaign levels from Halo: The Master Chief Collection, where Guilty Spark plays a pivotal narrative role, have been praised by various sources to be among the best campaign levels in the Halo series: "343 Guilty Spark" and "The Library" in Combat Evolved, and "Halo" in Halo 3.

The developers formerly responsible for the Halo video game franchise, after Bungie's separation from Microsoft, were named 343 Industries (now Halo Studios) after the character. A Halloween pumpkin carving contest named 343 Guilt O'Lantern was organized annually by Halo.Bungie.Org from 2004 until 2016; both the contest's title and logo used the character's design and name as inspiration. Video game journalists have recognized the similarity of Guilty Spark's design aesthetics to that of the Ghost, robotic companions to player character Guardians in the Destiny video game franchise, as among the most recognizable elements taken from the Halo series by Bungie.

== See also ==
- AI control problem, a discussion on hypothetical precautionary measures about rogue AI
