= Halo: Ghosts of Onyx =

2006 novel by Eric Nylund

- Halo: Ghosts of Onyx book cover
- Author: Eric Nylund
- Language: English
- Series: Halo
- Genre: Military science fiction
- Publisher: Tor
- Publication date: October 31, 2006 (US, UK)
- Publication place: United States
- Media type: Print (Paperback)
- Pages: 384
- ISBN: 0-7653-1568-8
- OCLC: 71322083
- Dewey Decimal: 813/.54 22
- LC Class: PS3564.Y55 H35 2006
- Preceded by: Halo: First Strike
- Followed by: Halo: Contact Harvest

Halo: Ghosts of Onyx is a military science fiction novel by Eric Nylund, based on the Halo series of video games. The book was released in October 2006 and is the fourth Halo novel; Nylund's third contribution to the series. Onyx was also the first of three Halo novels to be published by Tor Books, rather than the previous publisher, Del Rey.

Ghosts of Onyx details the creation of a group of supersoldiers known as the SPARTAN-IIIs to defend humanity against the alien collective known as the Covenant. After the events of Halo 2, the SPARTAN's training world of Onyx is beset by robotic attackers. The SPARTANs and their trainers must fight the robots and the Covenant as they work to uncover the planet's secrets.

Upon release, Ghosts of Onyx garnered generally positive reviews. The novel debuted on The New York Times bestseller list and became an international bestseller.

== Background and writing ==
Ghosts of Onyx author Eric Nylund had previously written two of the three past Halo novels, The Fall of Reach and First Strike, and went to Halo's developer Bungie with an outline of what he wanted to do next. According to Nylund, Bungie gave him room to write the story as long as he accomplished some "very specific [story] goals", sometimes making changes to the Halo universe to incorporate his ideas. However, he acknowledged the difficulty of fitting his story into the rest of the Halo universe was far greater for Ghosts of Onyx than the other novels as more of the story had been made public and was no longer able to be modified. Nylund mentioned in an interview with IGN that writing a Halo novel had both its positive aspects and drawbacks. "It's better because I have all these great toys and characters to play with," Nylund stated in an interview, "It's not so good because I have to work and play well with other parts of the intellectual property so everything meshes."

Ghosts of Onyx, originally known as Ghosts of Coral, was the first Halo novel to be published by Tor Books instead of Del Rey. Nylund had 15 weeks to write the book, as opposed to the 7 weeks for The Fall of Reach, but he claimed he still "lost sleep... ate a bunch of chocolate and drank too much coffee." Tor's editors also had more time than those of Del Rey and helped "untangle" the complicated plot of Onyx. On writing, Nylund pointed out that "tension is the cornerstone of any good story", and that Ghosts of Onyx would be no different.

IGN's reviewer, Douglass C. Perry, found that by using short paragraphs and many jumps in time "[the novel's] style of writing keeps the pace going, even when nothing much is going on." This technique is used deliberately by Nylund to hasten the pace to avoid "fatiguing the reader and losing them."

== Synopsis ==
=== Setting ===
Ghosts of Onyx takes place in the 26th century, where humanity, under the auspices of the United Nations Space Command, has developed faster-than-light travel and colonized hundreds of worlds. Without warning, an alien collective known as the Covenant attacks the outer human colony of Harvest. The Covenant begin to hunt down human colonies, vitrifying the surface of each world. Humanity's best weapon against the technologically superior Covenant are the SPARTAN-IIs, supersoldiers equipped with biomedical augmentation and powerful armor; unfortunately, there are too few of the SPARTANs to turn the tide of the war.

=== Characters ===
Kurt-051
Kurt is a SPARTAN-II who serves in John-117's squad. Kurt is known for his sense of intuition, which saves his team on several occasions. Recruited to train a new series of Spartans, Kurt is devastated by the massive casualties his trainees suffer. In response, Kurt begins instituting illegal brain modifications to give his soldiers a better chance at survival. Due to the secretive lengths taken by his superiors to recruit him to the program, none of Kurt's former colleagues know he is alive.
Franklin Mendez
Mendez is one of the SPARTAN-III project's trainers. In Nylund's previous novel, Halo: The Fall of Reach, Mendez is the SPARTAN-II's trainer and leaves shortly after humanity's first encounter with the Covenant to train the next generation of Spartans. After the next batch of SPARTAN-IIs are postponed, Mendez returns to active duty fighting against the Covenant before training the SPARTAN-IIIs.
Catherine Halsey
Halsey is the creator behind the SPARTAN-II project. In order to train the young recruits whom she has selected for the program, Halsey abducts the children and replaces them with clones. Though her soldiers are phenomenally successful, Halsey abruptly leaves with the injured SPARTAN Kelly in Halo: First Strike on an unspecified mission. After years of willingly manipulating her "children", Halsey decides to attempt to save them all instead of throwing them into a war she believes humanity will lose.
James Ackerson
Ackerson is a Colonel in the Army, and a fierce opponent of the SPARTAN-II program; during The Fall of Reach, Ackerson goes as far as attempting to kill John-117 in a training exercise. Ackerson proposes his own SPARTAN program, which would attempt to duplicate the SPARTAN-II's operational record at a lower cost—creating "disposable Spartans." The existence of this program is kept a secret from the public and much of the UNSC, especially Halsey.

=== Plot summary ===
The story begins with a group of SPARTAN-IIIs being deployed to a Covenant fleet refueling depot in the year 2545. The soldiers destroy the facility, but all save two of the three hundred SPARTANs are killed. The narrative then moves back to 2531, where SPARTAN-IIs are deployed against human insurrectionists; though the team is almost captured, the timely intervention of Kurt-051 allows the team to complete their mission. Meanwhile, Colonel James Ackerson meets with the Office of Naval Intelligence (ONI). Ackerson announces his plan to create a new breed of SPARTANs which retains much of the supersoldiers' effectiveness, without the high price tag of the SPARTAN-II program. These SPARTAN-IIIs are trained by Franklin Mendez, as well as Kurt-051. With his death staged by ONI, Kurt-051 is placed in full charge of SPARTAN-III training, under the name and rank of Lieutenant Kurt Ambrose. The SPARTAN-III project is carried out on a secret ONI planet named Onyx, where there is also an archaeological excavation of ancient Forerunner ruins in an area known as "Zone 67". When a team of SPARTAN-IIIs goes missing in Zone 67, it is declared off-limits to all personnel.

Like the SPARTAN-IIs, the SPARTAN-III candidates undergo radical cybernetic and biological enhancements and are outfitted with special armor to increase their abilities. The first SPARTAN-III company proves highly successful, but is wiped out when ordered to destroy a Covenant orbital shipyard in 2537. Shaken by the massacre of his troops, Kurt improves the training regimen for his next batch of SPARTAN-III recruits, but they too are all killed in action so Kurt, in an effort to reduce casualties, institutes illegal biological modifications on the third company of SPARTANs. While conducting a training exercise near Zone 67, UNSC personnel find themselves under attack by alien robotic drones.

Meanwhile, Dr. Catherine Halsey, the SPARTAN-II project's creator, along with the SPARTAN Kelly-087 arrive in the Onyx system. As they near the surface of the planet they are attacked by more robot drones and crash, meeting up with the human survivors of the attacks. Halsey identifies the robotic drones as Forerunner Sentinels from the artificial intelligence Cortana's logs of the events of Halo: Combat Evolved. Halsey sends a message back to Earth, which is under attack by Covenant; in response, Lord Hood sends the SPARTAN-IIs Fred-104, Linda-058, and Will-043 to Onyx.

At the Forerunner ringworld Delta Halo, the Covenant are in the midst of a civil war, while also trying to fight against the parasitic Flood trying to escape from the ringworld. Elites intercept Halsey's distress signal and learn of the existence of Onyx and its Forerunner technology. Both the Covenant and the UNSC forces which arrive at Onyx are attacked by Sentinels. The entire UNSC fleet at Onyx is destroyed by the ensuing battle, save for one stealth ship, the Dusk, which stays hidden, observing the events.

The remaining human forces on Onyx discover a Forerunner city being rapidly uncovered by the Sentinels, and are guided into a massive sphere by Dr. Halsey. She determines that the entire planet is actually a "Shield World" constructed by the Forerunners to protect themselves from the firing of the Halo ringworlds, which are designed to eradicate all sentient life. Fighting off Covenant pursuers, the humans discover an entrance leading to a Dyson Sphere. Kurt remains behind in order to detonate two nuclear weapons to stop the Covenant from following the humans into the Sphere. Hiding at a distance from Onyx, the Dusk watches as Onyx's surface rips apart to reveal that the entire world is constructed of Sentinels, all connected together to provide an impenetrable defense around the Dyson Sphere at the heart of the planet. The Sentinels annihilate the remaining Covenant fleet vessels orbiting the planet and the Prowler retreats. Fred, now inside the Dyson Sphere, takes command of the survivors and orders everyone to search for method of escape.

== Reception ==
IGN gave Ghosts of Onyx good marks, praising Nylund's writing style and how Onyx managed to tie up many plot threads that were left hanging from both the novels and the games. The publication did note, however, that the Master Chief made only a cameo appearance, and that Ghosts of Onyx is "about the supporting cast of characters", rather than the heroes of the video game. Offering a less positive outlook on the book were publications like Subnova.com, which blasted the novel as being much worse than Halo: First Strike, introducing characters the reader didn't care about and using too much jargon. The reviewer stated that "It's a good book. Honest. It just doesn't measure up to the standard set by the other books in the series." In response to complaints about typographical errors, Nylund responded that a reprint of the book fixing these issues would appear.

Ghosts of Onyx debuted as The New York Times bestseller, remaining on the list for eleven weeks. The novel would go on to become an international bestseller; a mass-market paperback would be released on April 7, 2007.
