= Halo: The Flood =

2003 novel by William C. Dietz

The Flood
- First edition
- Author: William C. Dietz
- Cover artist: Lorraine McLees
- Language: English
- Series: Halo
- Genre: Military science fiction
- Publisher: Del Rey, Tor Books (reprint)
- Publication date: April 1, 2003 October 12, 2010 (reprint)
- Publication place: United States
- Media type: Print (Paperback)
- Pages: 352, 432 (reprint)
- ISBN: 0-345-45921-0
- Preceded by: Halo: The Fall of Reach
- Followed by: Halo: First Strike

Halo: The Flood is a military science fiction novel by William C. Dietz, based on the Halo series of video games and based specifically on the 2001 video game Halo: Combat Evolved, the first game in the series. The book was released in April 2003 and is the second Halo novel. Closely depicting the events of the game, The Flood begins with the escape of a human ship Pillar of Autumn from enemy aliens known as the Covenant. When the Pillar of Autumn unexpectedly discovers a massive artifact known as "Halo", the humans must square off against the Covenant and a second terrifying force in a desperate attempt to uncover Halo's secrets and stay alive. Though the book roughly follows the same events of the Xbox game, featuring identical dialogue, Dietz also describes events not seen by the game's protagonist, the super-soldier Master Chief.

After the success of the first Halo novel, Halo: The Fall of Reach, publisher Del Rey and Halo publisher Microsoft signed a deal for new books based on Xbox games, including another entry in the Halo series. Del Ray approached author Dietz to write the next book. Dietz incorporated his first-hand experience in the military for the additional scenes of The Flood not found in the game.

Upon release, Halo: The Flood cracked the Publishers Weekly Top Ten Bestsellers List for Paperbacks, but critical reception to the novel was less positive than Eric Nylund's Fall of Reach or other Halo novels. The repetitive fight scenes and dramatically different characterization of the protagonist compared to Nylund's work were seen as major flaws, and Dietz's style of writing was alternatively praised and lambasted. The next Halo novel, Halo: First Strike, would serve to bridge the gap between Combat Evolved and its sequel, Halo 2.

The book was re-released on October 12, 2010, with new content and editorial corrections.

== Background ==
The first Halo book, Halo: The Fall of Reach, sold more than 1,000,000 copies and prompted an extended agreement between Del Rey Books and Microsoft to produce more Halo novels. Science fiction writer Larry Niven, author of the Ringworld series of novels, was initially approached by Del Rey Books to pen a novelization of Halo: Combat Evolved. Niven declined, citing his inability to write for a "fully programmed universe". William C. Dietz, a Seattle-based science fiction author, was then approached to write the next Halo novel. Though he had never played the game, he immediately bought an Xbox console and a copy of Halo. When he learned that the game was selling rapidly at his local retailer, he agreed to pen the book.

Dietz, a former United States Navy Hospital Corpsman, incorporated elements of what he fondly called "The Green Machine" into his work; despite being in the 26th century, the marines of The Flood are very similar to their modern counterparts. To assist Dietz in writing, Bungie provided what Dietz referred to as "a tremendous" amount of background information on the Halo universe. Once Dietz had finished his draft, Bungie checked it over to make sure it complied with the plot established in the games and novels, as Bungie considers all Halo novels canon.

== Synopsis ==
=== Setting ===
Halo: The Flood is set in the year 2552. Humanity has colonized hundreds of worlds across the galaxy, using faster-than-light drives and cryonic sleep to travel between worlds. Without warning, a collective of alien races known as the Covenant began attacking the outlying colonies, brutally exterminating all life by vitrifying the surface of the planets. Humanity, outnumbered and outclassed by the alien's superior technology, wages a losing war against the enemy. After the human bastion of Reach falls to the Covenant, the human ship Pillar of Autumn jumps into Slipspace to lead the Covenant away from Earth.

=== Plot ===
Pillar of Autumn exits slipspace, discovering a massive ringworld hidden by a moon in orbit around a gas giant. In the system are a host of Covenant, who notice the lone ship. A Covenant leader forbids the fleet to fire on the Autumn, for fear of damaging the ring. Instead, they board the ship. The humans prepare for battle and rouse the Spartan supersoldier known as the Master Chief from suspended animation.

Deprived of defensive options, the Autumn's captain, Jacob Keyes, tells the crew to abandon ship. The Master Chief is entrusted with the artificial intelligence (AI) Cortana; given the wealth of tactical information the AI contains, Keyes cannot allow Cortana to fall into enemy hands. The Master Chief leaves for the surface of Halo in a lifeboat; other soldiers, including a battalion of shock troops led by Antonio Silva and his second-in-command, Melissa McKay, land by special drop pods, and take a strategic bluff from the Covenant. They use the location as a central command point for the survivors, called Alpha Base. Captain Keyes is captured by the Covenant, and taken aboard the cruiser Truth and Reconciliation; the Master Chief and a platoon of Marines later board the ship and rescue the captain. Keyes has learned that the ringworld they are on, called "Halo", is important to the Covenant and a weapon of great power. Keyes gives the Master Chief the mission of finding the Control Room of Halo before the Covenant. The Master Chief and Cortana discover the location of the Control Room, and with the help of some Marines, insert Cortana into Halo's computer network. However, Cortana realizes that the ring is not a weapon as they understood at all, and hurriedly tells the Master Chief to find Captain Keyes.

Dropped into the swamp where Keyes and his men disappeared, the Master Chief discovers that human and Covenant soldiers have been turned into zombie-like creatures by bulbous aliens. One soldier, Private Wallace Jenkins, is left still semi-conscious and painfully aware of his predicament, unable to control his movement or actions as his former friends and he attack McKay's troops. Jenkins intends on ending his life, but is instead captured by McKay for study. The Chief is approached by Halo's resident AI, 343 Guilty Spark, who informs the Chief that the creatures he has encountered are a parasitic life form called the Flood. To activate Halo's defenses to fight the Flood, Guilty Spark needs the Master Chief's help. In Halo's Control Room, Guilty Spark gives the Master Chief the key to activate Halo, but is stopped by a furious Cortana. Cortana explains that Halo is a weapon, but it doesn't kill the Flood—it kills their food, meaning humans, Covenant, and any other sentient life. Realizing that they have to stop Guilty Spark from activating Halo, Cortana and the Master Chief decide to destroy Halo by detonating the crash-landed Pillar of Autumn's fusion reactors. In order to do this, they need Captain Keyes' neural implants. Cortana discovers the Captain is still alive, held prisoner once again aboard the Truth and Reconciliation, as the Flood are trying to escape Halo. The Chief fights through Covenant and Flood to the Captain, but finds out he is too late—the Captain has been assimilated into the parasite. The Chief retrieves the implants and leaves the Truth for the Autumn.

While the Chief and Cortana head to the Autumn, Alpha Base is evacuated. Silva decides to retake the Truth and Reconciliation and pilot the ship away in order to avoid being on Halo when the Autumn blows. The ship is taken successfully, but McKay realizes that Silva is blinded to the danger of the Flood by the thought of promotion and glory; if the Flood escaped containment on Earth, the entire planet could fall. Realizing the Flood have to be stopped at all costs, she triggers a catastrophic failure that sends Truth and Reconciliation crashing into the ring, killing all aboard.

At the Autumn, the Master Chief is forced to destabilize the fusion reactors manually as 343 Guilty Spark and his robotic drones try to stop them. Once the countdown until detonation has begun, Cortana directs the Chief to a fighter still docked in the Pillar of Autumn hangar. Chief and Cortana escape the ring just as the Autumn explodes. Cortana scans for survivors and realizes that they are seemingly the only two who have made it. Cortana tells the Master Chief that the fight is finished, to which the Chief replies that they are just getting started.

== Reception ==
Reception to the book was mixed. Some reviewers found William C. Dietz's style of writing subpar when compared to that of Eric Nylund, differing greatly. Other critics took issue with how the novel did not depart enough from the game's storyline; fans complained about inconsistencies with the other novels and the game itself.

Responding to criticism about the book, including his interpretation of the Chief, Dietz replied:

...of [the book reviews] that I have read, the negative ones often say something to the effect that the book is just like the game, so why read it? What those readers may not realize is that I was hired to novelize the game. That means taking the game and turning it into a book [...] or, put another way, I did what I was hired to do. ...there must be some folks who feel that I wrote the Chief out of character. That's news to me. All I can tell you is that the Bungie folks, who care deeply about the character and the universe never raised that issue, and approved the book as written. However, there's no doubt that every author is different, and will approach characters differently. So if Nylund's rendition of the Chief is different from my own in subtle ways that would be understandable.

Despite the less enthusiastic response The Flood garnered than its predecessor, the book still sold well. Soon after release, The Flood made the Publishers Weekly top ten bestsellers paperback list. The next book in the series, Halo: First Strike, would be written by Eric Nylund and bridge the gap between Halo: Combat Evolved and Halo 2.

== See also ==
- Halo: Combat Evolved
