= Tim Dadabo =

American voice actor

- Born: Timothy Nicholas Dadabo
- Occupation: Voice actor
- Years active: 1999-present
- Website: www.timdadabo.com

Timothy Nicholas Dadabo is an American voice actor. He is known for his voice over work in video games, movies and TV shows. He is also known as the voice of Apple in the Apple Jacks commercials during the 2000s and early 2010s.

== Filmography ==
=== TV series ===
Year	Title	Role	Notes
2007	American Dad!	Waiter	Ep. "The Most Adequate Christmas Ever"
2011	The Looney Tunes Show	Backup Singer, Game Show Contestant; Gustavo (singing voice)	2 Episodes
2012	Kung Fu Panda: Legends of Awesomeness	Shengqi, Old Man	Ep. "Present Tense"
2013	Doc McStuffins	Norton	Ep. "Doc McStuffins Goes McMobile"
TBA	HobbyKids Adventures	HobbyFrog	Season 3

=== Films ===
- A Turtle's Tale: Sammy's Adventures – Policeman
- Escape from Planet Earth – Larry Longeyes
- Two Dreadful Children – Dick Dunbar

=== Documentaries ===
- Outrageous Acts of Psych – Narrator
- Outrageous Acts of Science – Himself – Narrator, narrator
- The Year in Pup Culture – Himself

=== Video games ===
Year	Title	Role	Notes
1999	Septerra Core: Legacy of the Creator	Aspertine	
2000	Carrier	Jack Ingles	
2001	Red Faction	Commander, Elite Guard	
2001	Halo: Combat Evolved	343 Guilty Spark	
2004	Leisure Suit Larry: Magna Cum Laude	Larry Lovage, 'Little' Larry, Nigel, Rathgar, Russell	
2004	Halo 2	343 Guilty Spark, Corporal Perez	
2005	Stubbs the Zombie in Rebel Without a Pulse	Officer Hannity, Doctor	
2007	Def Jam Icon	Fast Hal	
2007	Halo 3	343 Guilty Spark	
2008	Hail to the Chimp	Crackers, Floyd, Murgatroyd	
2009	Red Faction: Guerrilla	Additional voices	
2009	Dragon Age: Origins	Varathorn, Gethon, Hale	
2010	Risk: Factions	General William 'Fatty' McGutterpants, Generalissimo Meow; Commandant SixFour, His Excellency Gary, Sergeant Farro	
2010	Disney Guilty Party	The Commodore, Rudyard "Kid Riddle" Dickens, Schmoot	
2011	Dragon Age II	Additional voices	
2011	Nicktoons MLB	Fanboy	
2011	Halo: Combat Evolved Anniversary	343 Guilty Spark	
2014	Scooby Doo and Looney Tunes: Cartoon Universe	Speedy Gonzales	
2014	Watch Dogs	Hacker	
2014	The Legend of Korra	Chi-Blocker 2, Triad 2, Pro-Bender 2	
2014	Halo 2 Anniversary	343 Guilty Spark	
2016	Teenage Mutant Ninja Turtles: Mutants in Manhattan	Bebop, Stone Warriors	
2023	Teenage Mutant Ninja Turtles: Splintered Fate	Genghis Frog	
2026	Halo: Campaign Evolved	343 Guilty Spark, Minister of Harmony	

=== Books ===
- Halo: Primordium (2012) - Chakas/343 Guilty Spark
- Halo: Point of Light (2021) - 343 Guilty Spark
- The Island Mother (2022)
- The Discarded Instrument: Discarded No More (2026)
- Halo: The Fall of Reach (Full-Cast Dramatized Adaptation) (2026)
