= Halo: First Strike =

2003 novel by Eric Nylund

First Strike
- Halo: First Strike book cover
- Author: Eric Nylund
- Language: English
- Series: Halo
- Genre: Military science fiction
- Publisher: Del Rey
- Publication date: December 2, 2003
- Publication place: United States
- Media type: Print (Paperback); Audiobook
- Pages: 340
- ISBN: 0-345-46781-7
- Preceded by: Halo: The Flood
- Followed by: Halo: Ghosts of Onyx

Halo: First Strike is a military science fiction novel by Eric Nylund, based on the Halo series of video games. The book was released in December 2003 and is the third Halo novel; Nylund's second contribution to the series. The novel serves as a bridge between the events of the games Halo: Combat Evolved and its 2004 sequel Halo 2. First Strike was also released as an audiobook, narrated by Todd McLaren.

Halo: First Strike opens with the arrival of the Covenant armada at the human stronghold planet of Reach. The book follows both the unsuccessful attempt to defend Reach by the SPARTAN-IIs who were on the planet's surface and the adventures of the rag-tag survivors of the battle at Alpha Halo. The book also reveals that humanity's worst fear is going to come true: the Covenant is on its way to Earth. The book was well received by critics and sold well, making The New York Times Best Seller list. Critics found it added depth to the Halo video games and that it was exciting throughout.

== Background ==
First Strike was Nylund's second Halo novel after his task of writing the prequel to the first game, 2001's Halo: The Fall of Reach. Nylund said in an interview that he wrote the book within sixteen weeks, a much longer deadline than the seven weeks he had to complete The Fall of Reach. However, due to more Halo canon already being published Nylund found it harder to write First Strike into the existing story; "There were more events and characters to link and keep track of…timelines to sync up…like threading three needles at once with one hand." To write a better novel than The Fall of Reach, Nylund read military combat manuals and biographies of soldiers, he also tried to improve where fans had criticized the first Halo book.

== Synopsis ==
=== Setting ===
First Strike takes place in the 26th century, where humanity, under the governance of the United Nations Space Command (UNSC), has been fighting a losing war against a religious collective of alien races known as the Covenant. Humanity's best defense against the Covenant is the SPARTAN Project, super-soldiers in powered armor, but these elite troops are too few to turn the tide of war in the UNSC's favor. Following a Covenant attack on Reach, a planet within UNSC jurisdiction, the Pillar of Autumn flees randomly coming across an ancient installation built by the mysterious Forerunners. The Covenant call this relic Halo, and believe it is a means of transcendence. The UNSC discover that Halo destroys all sentient life in the galaxy to prevent the parasitic Flood from spreading beyond Halo. The SPARTAN Master Chief and his artificial intelligence companion, Cortana, detonate the Pillar of Autumn's engines, destroying Halo. Escaping the destruction via a fighter, the Chief and Cortana believe themselves the only survivors of the catastrophe.

=== Plot ===
The novel begins in orbit above planet Reach, as humanity fights the Covenant invasion forces. The last line of defense for the planet is an array of magnetic accelerator cannons (MACs) orbiting the planet. The Master Chief sends a team of Spartans to the surface of Reach to protect the MAC's planet-based power generators. Ultimately, the Covenant are able to destroy the generators and begin bombarding the planet's surface – melting its surface to glass ('glassing the planet'). The surviving Spartans flee underground to the hidden headquarters of the Office of Naval Intelligence. There they meet Dr. Halsey who, with help of some of the surviving Spartans, uncovers a strange crystalline shard in a cavern built by the ancient Forerunners. Pursued by the Covenant, the Spartans retrieve the shard and collapse the passage behind them, which saves them from the pursuing Covenant forces, but also traps them deep under the surface of Reach.

The book then shifts to events occurring soon after Halo, as the Master Chief and Cortana drift through the ruins of Halo, they discover other survivors including Sergeant Johnson and Corporal Locklear. The group commandeer the Covenant flagship Ascendant Justice and use its slipspace capabilities to return to the Reach system. To prevent the Covenant from finding Earth with a tracking device, the humans plan to find a suitably undamaged human ship to take them to Earth. Upon arrival the group receive a radio signal used by the Spartans in their training days. On the surface, they find three Spartans and Vice Admiral Danforth Whitcomb, the Deputy Chief of Naval Operations. The Vice Admiral arms a "Nova thermonuclear mine", a weapon that would destroy the planet. The Master Chief and his newly acquired team of Spartans then proceed to rescue Dr. Halsey and the other Spartans that were trapped under the surface of the planet. Meanwhile, Cortana, still aboard Ascendant Justice, learns that the Covenant already know the location of Earth and are preparing an invasion fleet. For additional power, Cortana salvages the derelict UNSC frigate Gettysburg, in effect creating a hybrid vessel referred to throughout the book as Gettysburg-Ascendant Justice.

Seeking the Forerunner shard, the Covenant attack, severely damaging Ascendant Justice, but are temporarily defeated. In order to make repairs, the UNSC forge an alliance with human separatists hidden in an asteroid field whose help also allows them to partially repair the crippled Gettysburg. Halsey, after saving the clinically dead Spartan Linda-058, abducts Spartan Kelly-087 and flees in a stolen ship, leaving Corporal Locklear with instructions to stop the crystal from falling into Covenant hands. Locklear decides to destroy the crystal, inadvertently killing himself, but stopping the Covenant from tracking the crystal's radioactive emissions and by extension the Ascendant Justice. However, the Covenant attack the asteroid base in overwhelming force, forcing the UNSC forces to flee into slipspace and abandon the separatists to destruction.

With the knowledge that the Covenant are in route to Earth, the Master Chief and his fellow Spartans decide to disrupt the invasion force at their rendezvous point. The Spartans successfully infiltrate the Covenant space station, Unyielding Hierophant, set it to self-destruct and escape in a drop-ship. On board the Ascendant Justice, Whitcomb tricks the Covenant fleet into following the ship closer to the Unyielding Hierophant; when the station explodes the entire Covenant armada is destroyed or damaged. Master Chief and the surviving Spartans take the partially repaired Gettysburg, which has been equipped with Ascendant Justice's slipspace drive, back to Earth with Sgt. Johnson and Cortana to warn of the approaching invasion. Meanwhile, the Covenant leadership discuss the fate of the "incompetent one," an Elite who allowed Halo to be destroyed and Ascendant Justice to be captured; setting the stage for Halo 2.

== Reception ==
Upon release, First Strike was a critical and commercial success, being the first Halo novel to make The New York Times bestsellers list. IGN stated that the writing was "terse and exciting" and that players waiting for the release of Halo 2 could pick up interesting hints about what was to come in the game and in the ilovebees viral marketing campaign. About.com's Eric Qualls stated that First Strike and the other Halo novels "make you appreciate Halo and Halo 2 a hundred times more", and strongly recommended that fans of the game pick up the novel. Shawn of Digital Monkey Box criticized the way the Nylund sidelines characters who were developed early in the book as the Master Chief takes precedence but overall praised the book highly. Nylund's character development and the ethical challenges presented to the Master Chief were praised however and reviewer Josh Carter considered it superior to either of the previous books. When Phil Jones reviewed the book for Science Fiction Crowsnest he found that "the combat does get somewhat tiresome" but concluded that the book was a good, easy read and "as spin-offs go, it is not bad." The First Strike audiobook was also well received, reviewer Cliff Bakehorn commenting that "Todd McLaren did a good job narrating", as well as finding it to be "an exciting story throughout."
