= List of Halo characters =

Major recurring characters of the Halo multimedia franchise are organized below by their respective affiliations within the series' fictional universe. The franchise's central story revolves around conflict between humanity under the auspices of the United Nations Space Command or UNSC, and an alien alliance known as the Covenant. The artifacts left behind by an ancient race known as the Forerunner play a central role—particularly the ringworlds known as Halos, built to contain the threat of the parasitic Flood.

The characters underwent major changes over the course of the first Halo game's development, and were continually refined or changed with the advance of graphics and animation technologies. Halo's commercial and critical success has led to large amounts of merchandise featuring the franchise's characters to be produced. The Master Chief, the most visible symbol of the series, has been heavily marketed, with the character's visage appearing on soda bottles, T-shirts, and Xbox controllers. Other merchandise produced includes several sets of action figures. The franchise's characters have received varying reception, with some praised as among the best in gaming, while others have been called cliched or boring.

== Character design and creation ==
The Halo franchise originated with the 2001 video game Halo: Combat Evolved. The game's characters were continually refined through development, as developer Bungie was bought by Microsoft and the platform shifted from the Macintosh to the Xbox. Other Bungie developers would often add input to character development, even if they were not working on the game itself. An outside artist, Shi Kai Wang, developed the early concept sketches of what would eventually become the Master Chief. However upon developing a 3D model, the artists decided the Chief looked too slender, almost effeminate, and subsequently bulked up the character. Early Covenant Elites had a more natural jaw rather than the split mandibles they would later sport; at one point, Jason Jones was also insistent about having a tail on the Elites, but this idea was eventually dropped.

Originally, the game designers decided to hand-key character animations. The animators videotaped themselves to have reference footage for the movement of game characters; art director Marcus Lehto's wife recorded him "running around a field with a two-by-four" for the human marines. By Halo 3, Bungie staff had a special room designed for capturing reference material. Many of the subsequent human character's features were based on Bungie designers, while character animators looked to simian, ursine, insectoid, and reptilian features for the various races of the Covenant. The artificial intelligences of the characters was also deliberately limited to make sure they acted realistically to environmental changes and situations. Later games use motion capture to capture the movement and facial acting of the cast.

=== Voice acting ===
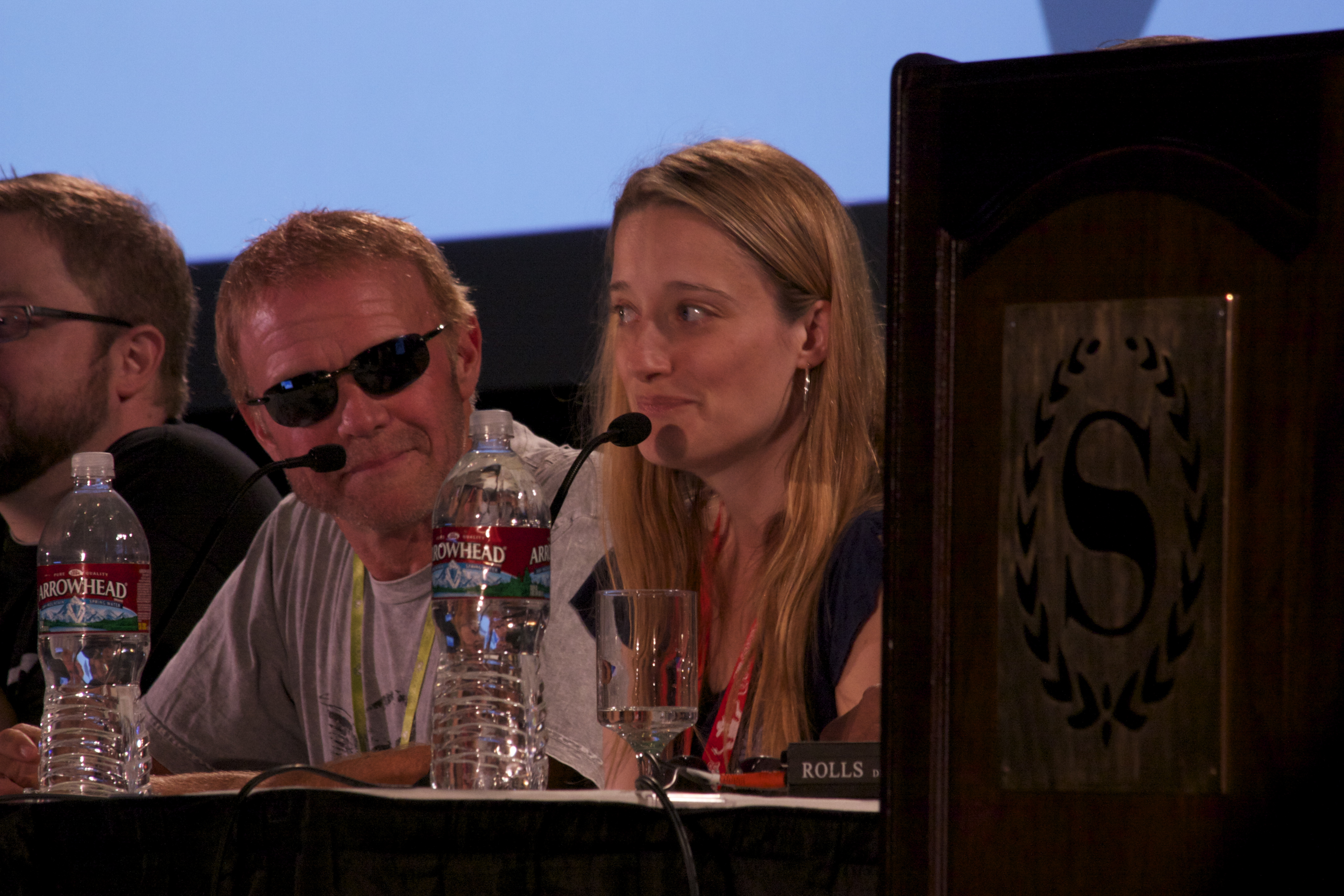
Steve Downes and Jen Taylor, the voices of Master Chief and Cortana, at HaloFest during PAX Prime 2011

The Halo series features voice work by television and film actors including Ron Perlman, Orlando Jones, Michelle Rodriguez, Robert Davi, and Terence Stamp. Voice acting became more important as Halo: Combat Evolved's sequels were developed; Halo 2 had 2,000 lines of combat dialogue, while Halo 3 has in excess of 14,000 lines. Some actors voiced their lines in remote locations, while others traveled to a studio to record their lines. In interviews, Halo's voice actors stated that they had no idea that the games would become such a critical and commercial success. Steve Downes, the voice of the game's protagonist, stated that generally when a voice actor has finished their lines, their involvement with the game ends. As the characters in Combat Evolved were relatively undefined, the voice actors were given leeway to develop their own style and personality.

Aside from major character roles, members of the Halo community and Halo fans have had small roles in the games. The cast from the machinima Red vs. Blue won a lengthy charity auction for a voice role in Halo 3, and do a comedy routine which changes depending on the difficulty level the game is played on. Cast members of the defunct TV show Firefly—Alan Tudyk, Nathan Fillion, and Adam Baldwin—have roles as marines in Halo 3 as well as Halo 3: ODST and Halo 5: Guardians.

== United Nations Space Command (UNSC) ==
=== Master Chief ===
Master Chief Petty Officer John-117, commonly referred to as simply the Master Chief, is the main protagonist and main playable character in many of the Halo games. The character is voiced by Steve Downes, a Chicago disc jockey. He is one of the Spartans, an elite group of augmented soldiers raised from childhood to be super soldiers. Assisted by the artificial intelligence Cortana, he prevents the catastrophic firing of the Halo Installation 04 in Halo: Combat Evolved. Developing the character of Master Chief was part of Bungie's efforts to make players invested in playing the game. The character has since become a gaming icon, the mascot of the Xbox, and rated as one of the greatest characters in video games. In live action, the Chief has been portrayed by Daniel Cudmore in Halo 4: Forward Unto Dawn and Pablo Schreiber in the Paramount+ series.

=== Cortana ===
Cortana, voiced in the games by Jen Taylor, is the artificial intelligence (AI) who assists the Master Chief in the video games. She is one of many "smart" AIs, and is based on the brain of Dr. Catherine Halsey; the nature of her construction means she is subject to a finite lifespan. In Halo 4, Cortana begins to succumb to her age, and sacrifices herself to save Chief and Earth from the Forerunner Didact, but Halo 5: Guardians reveals that she had survived the ordeal. Having found access to the Domain, a Forerunner repository of knowledge, Cortana believes that AIs should serve as the galaxy's caretakers, putting her in conflict with her creators. In Halo Infinite, however, after Atriox seemingly defeats Chief which devastates her, Cortana finally destroys herself. Cortana has been called one of gaming's greatest characters, and one of the "50 Greatest Female Characters" and the heart of the franchise. The character's sex appeal has also been a focus on commentary.

=== Avery Johnson ===
Avery Junior Johnson is a Marine sergeant major who leads human forces throughout the Halo series. The character was voiced by David Scully in all Halo media until 2013 following the actor's retirement, while Keston John succeeds him in the role for Halo: Campaign Evolved. Johnson and a few other Marines survive the destruction of Installation 04 and are rescued by Cortana and the Master Chief during the novel Halo: First Strike. Johnson plays a larger role in Halo 2, joining forces with the Arbiter to stop Tartarus from activating Installation 05. In Halo 3, the Covenant attempt to use him to activate the Halo Array, but are foiled; when the Master Chief decides to activate the local Halo to stop the Flood infestation, the Forerunner construct 343 Guilty Spark kills Johnson to prevent it. Johnson is featured in The Halo Graphic Novel story, "Breaking Quarantine," and a main character in the 2007 novel Halo: Contact Harvest. Johnson is also featured in the real time strategy game Halo Wars 2, as a playable leader for the UNSC.

In many ways similar to the stereotype of charismatic black Marines found in other science fiction (such as Sergeant Apone in Aliens whom Johnson was partially based on), some critics found Johnson a flat character. Joseph Staten admitted that Johnson was static in Halo: Combat Evolved, and that despite the character's potential, "he sort of inherited those caricature aspects [from Halo]." Contact Harvest was a chance "to do right" by the character. Luke Cuddy identified Johnson's character arc as closely tied to the series' themes of struggle and sacrifice. He has been included in critic lists of the best black video game characters.

=== Jacob Keyes ===
Captain Jacob Keyes (voiced by Pete Stacker) is a captain in the UNSC who appears in Halo: Reach, Halo: Combat Evolved, Halo: The Flood, Halo: The Cole Protocol, and Halo: The Fall of Reach. His first chronological appearance is in The Fall of Reach, where, as a young Lieutenant, he accompanies Dr. Catherine Halsey on her mission to screen possible SPARTAN-II Project subjects. During battle with the Covenant over the planet Sigma Octanus IV, Keyes became known for his complicated and unorthodox maneuver which allowed him to win against impossible odds. Keyes leads his ship the Pillar of Autumn to Alpha Halo in Combat Evolved. There, Keyes leads a guerrilla insurgency against the Covenant. Captured and assimilated by the parasitic Flood, he is mercifully killed by the Master Chief, who takes Keyes' neural implants to control the ship. Danny Sapani portrays a markedly different iteration of Keyes in the television series.

=== Miranda Keyes ===
Commander Miranda Keyes is the daughter of Jacob Keyes and Catherine Halsey. Miranda appears in Halo 2, Halo 3 and in the final chapter of Halo: The Cole Protocol. In Halo 2 she supports the Master Chief in his battles, and assists Sergeant Major Johnson and the Arbiter in stopping the activation of the Halo Array. In Halo 3, Keyes attempts a rescue of Johnson when he is captured by the Covenant to activate the Ark; she is killed by Truth in the attempt. Keyes was voiced by Julie Benz in Halo 2'. Benz said that she loved voiceover work and that it was pure chance she had become the voice of Keyes in the first place. When IGN asked Benz what she thought of her character, she admitted she hadn't played the game. The role was recast for Halo 3, where Justis Bolding assumes the role. Olive Gray portrays a markedly different iteration of Miranda Keyes in the television series.

=== Catherine Halsey ===
Dr. Catherine Elizabeth Halsey is a civilian scientist. She works with the military to run the SPARTAN-II Project, creating the most effective weapons humanity has against insurrection, and then in the war with the Covenant. Cortana is derived from Halsey's cloned brain. Jen Taylor, who also voices Cortana, provides the voice and motion capture performance, in Halo: Reach, Halo 4, Halo 5: Guardians, and Halo: Infinite. The character is voiced by Shelley Calene-Black in Halo Legends. Natascha McElhone portrays the character in the television series.

=== James Ackerson ===
James Ackerson is a high-ranking UNSC Army colonel. He convinces the Office of Naval Intelligence to fund the SPARTAN-III Project, and vied with Halsey for funding. After an attempt to frustrate Halsey's Spartans, Cortana fakes orders to reassign Ackerson to the front lines of the war. On Mars, he is captured by the Covenant, and executed after leading them on a wild goose chase for a supposed Forerunner artifact on Earth; the ruse is used by Ackerson's brother Ruwan to help the UNSC strike a blow against the Covenant. Joseph Morgan portrays the character in the television series.

=== Franklin Mendez ===
Senior Chief Petty Officer Franklin Mendez is the SPARTAN-II's trainer. After teaching the first class of Spartans, Mendez sees additional action fighting the Covenant, before being recruited to train the SPARTAN-IIIs. Initially uncertain of the new Spartans' potential, Mendez trains several companies of the supersoliders. During the events of Ghosts of Onyx he is sealed inside a shield world with Halsey and other Spartans, and after the Human-Covenant War, retires from service.

=== Terrence Hood ===
Fleet Admiral Lord Terrence Hood (voiced by Ron Perlman) is commander of the UNSC Home Fleet, as well an English noble. During the events of Halo 2 and 3 he defends Earth against the Covenant, staying behind when Master Chief and Arbiter depart for the Ark. In Halo 3's epilogue, he leads a memorial service for those who fell in the conflict. The short story "Rosbach's World" reveals Hood escapes Cortana's attack on Earth during the end of Halo 5, ending up along with ONI chief Serin Osman on a safe world. Hood blames himself for the situation due to allowing the Master Chief free rein and falls into a depression. Keir Dullea portrays Hood in the television series.

=== Serin Osman ===
Admiral Serin Osman is a former Spartan-II who washed out of the program. Osman was hand-picked by Office of Naval Intelligence leader Admiral Margaret Parangosky to be her successor. After the Human-Covenant War Osman served as the leader of Kilo-5, a black ops team that worked to destabilize humanity's enemies to prevent future war. She later orders the assassination of Catherine Halsey, believing her usefulness is at an end. Thanks to the loyalty of the artificial intelligence Black Box, Osman is evacuated from Earth before Cortana attacks. The character appears in the Kilo-5 Trilogy, Halo: Last Light, Halo: Fractures, Halo: Retribution, Halo 4 Spartan Ops, and Halo Fractures.

=== Thomas Lasky ===
Captain Thomas Lasky is the captain of the UNSC Infinity. Portrayed by Thom Green, he is a main character in the web series Halo 4: Forward Unto Dawn, which depicts his training at an officer academy and rescue by Master Chief as the Covenant invade and glass the planet. In Halo 4, Lasky (voiced by Darren O'Hare) serves as Infinity's first officer and aids the Chief on the Forerunner world Requiem. When Infinity's captain refuses to listen to the Master Chief and Cortana and leaves Requiem, he is relieved of command and Lasky is promoted. He reappears in Halo 4 Spartan Ops and the Halo: Escalation comic series. In Halo 5: Guardians, Lasky reluctantly sends Spartan Fireteam Osiris after the rogue Spartan Blue Team. When AIs begin pledging loyalty to Cortana en masse, Lasky and Infinity are forced to flee Earth. In Halo: Bad Blood, Lasky and Infinity link up with Blue Team and Fireteam Osiris soon after.

=== Roland ===
Roland (voiced by Brian T. Delaney) is the current artificial intelligence aboard the UNSC flagship Infinity. Roland's avatar takes the form of a golden World War II fighter pilot. Unlike many human AI, Roland does not join Cortana and her Created, and continues to serve the UNSC. Roland appears in Halo 4 Spartan Ops, Halo 5, Halo: Spartan Assault, and spin-off media, including the Halo: Escalation comic series, Halo: Fractures and Halo: Tales from Slipspace.

=== Fernando Esparza ===
Fernando Esparza (voiced and performance-captured by Nicolas Roye in Halo Infinite who also voices Esparza in the audiobook of Halo: Edge of Dawn), also known as the Pilot and Echo 216, is a civilian engineer who joins the Master Chief in his travels across Zeta Halo in Halo Infinite and Halo: Edge of Dawn.

In Halo Infinite, Esparza rescues the Master Chief from being stranded for six months floating in space. Esparza serves as the Master Chief's very reluctant companion, often expressing a desire to go home and a frustration with the Spartan's continuing fight against the Banished. Nevertheless, he provides invaluable help to the Master Chief, serving as his pilot. Esparza eventually experiences an emotional breakdown, revealing to the Master Chief and the Weapon that he had stolen the Pelican and is a civilian engineer who volunteered for the UNSC rather than a soldier or even a proper pilot. The Master Chief reveals his own guilt over being unable to save Cortana in return. Esparza is later kidnapped and tortured by Jega 'Rdomnai to lure the Master Chief into a trap. The Master Chief rescues Esparza and kills Escharum. After the defeat of the Harbinger, Esparza finally reveals his name to the Master Chief and his AI companion, prompting the Weapon to choose one of her own.

In Halo: Edge of Dawn, Esparza continues to serve as the Master Chief's companion and pilot, although he also struggles with trauma, survivor's guilt over his actions, and lingering injuries from his torture. After the rescue of Lucas Browning, Esparza helps to take care of the young combat medic and reevaluates his own selfish behavior. As a result, Esparza volunteers to continue his travels with the Master Chief rather than remaining in safety at a large UNSC survivor camp where Esparza also receives treatment for his injuries. Esparza is saved from a Banished attack by four Swords of Sangheilios warriors and later arrives in a hijacked Banished dropship with them to rescue the Master Chief. When other UNSC survivors are discovered scattered across Zeta Halo, Esparza is one of the first to volunteer for search-and-rescue operations.

=== Spartans ===
Building on the failed ORION Program, Catherine Halsey and the UNSC Office of Naval Intelligence developed the SPARTAN-II program to create an elite corps of supersoldiers that could stem rebellions in the UNSC colonies. The Spartan candidates were kidnapped as children and replaced by flash clones that quickly died afterwards. After grueling training, they were subject to dangerous, even life-threatening physical augmentation, and equipped with "MJOLNIR" powered armor. While there were initially 300 participants, the results of these augmentations either caused at least half of them to be paralysed or killed, consigning a number to combat support vocations (eg administrative, strategic, desk-bound leadership etc) and eventually only 75 final candidates were capable of fighting. Following in the wake of the SPARTAN-II Project were the SPARTAN-IIIs, children orphaned by the Covenant War who became cheaper, more expendable soldiers. After the war, the UNSC began training Spartan-IVs from adult volunteers. The existence of the Spartans was disclosed to the public to raise morale as the Covenant War continued to go badly. In order to minimise demoralising the public, Spartans are never listed as 'Killed in Action', but only 'Missing in Action'.

==== Frederic-104 ====
Frederic-104 is a Spartan-II and one of the Master Chief's closest friends. He is voiced by Andrew Lowe in Halo: Legends, portrayed by Tony Giroux in Halo 4: Forward Unto Dawn, and portrayed by Travis Willingham in the Halo 2: Anniversary Terminals and in Halo 5: Guardians. Fred survives the fall of Reach, as shown in Halo: First Strike, and assists Master Chief and other Spartans in destroying a Covenant armada massing to attack Earth. In Halo: Ghosts of Onyx, Fred and Blue Team fight the Covenant on Onyx and end up within a Forerunner shield world. They reconnect with the outside world in Halo: Glasslands; though to them only a few days have passed, outside months have. In the Halo: Escalation comic series, Fred and the other members of Blue Team are reunited with the Master Chief, and appears alongside the Master Chief, Kelly and Linda in Halo 5: Guardians.

==== Linda-058 ====
Linda-058 (voiced by Andrea Bogart in the Halo 2: Anniversary terminals and Britt Baron in Halo 5: Guardians) is an excellent marksman. She appears in both much of the spin-off media and Halo 5: Guardians. After being mortally wounded in Halo: The Fall of Reach, she is placed into suspended animation. In Halo: First Strike she is revived and participates in action against the Covenant. In Ghosts of Onyx she and her fellow Spartans defend Earth from the Covenant, before being sent to the planet Onyx after receiving a message from Catherine Halsey. Following the end of the Human-Covenant war in Halo: Last Light, Linda and Blue Team investigate a Forerunner structure on the politically unstable planet of Gao and get caught in both the machinations of a power hungry leader and the plans of a rogue Forerunner AI, Intrepid Eye. In the Halo: Escalation comic series, Linda and the other members of Blue Team are reunited with the Master Chief, and she fights with Blue Team during the events of Halo 5. Linda is also the main character in the Halo: Lone Wolf comic series.

==== Kelly-087 ====
Kelly-087, voiced by Luci Christian in Halo: Legends, Jenna Berman in Halo 4: Forward Unto Dawn and Michelle Lukes in Halo 5: Guardians, is the Spartan-II's scout and the Master Chief's best friend. Kelly is noted for her incredible speed, even before augmentation. She is initially presumed lost with other Spartans dispatched to Reach during its invasion, but in Halo: First Strike it is revealed she survived. During the events of the novel Halsey kidnaps Kelly and flees with her to Onyx. Kelly appears alongside the Master Chief, Linda and Fred in Halo 5: Guardians.

==== James-005 ====
James-005 is a Spartan-II, appearing in Halo: The Fall of Reach and Halo: Empty Throne.

In Halo: The Fall of Reach, James serves as the fourth member of Blue Team during several battles in the Covenant war, serving as the team's scout. During the Battle of Sigma Octanus IV, James loses his left arm from the elbow down to a blast from a Hunter, but survives and helps to crush the alien creature and its bond brother with a large quartz monolith. While escaping, James has to be carried out by the Master Chief after passing out from his injuries. Having recovered by the time of the Fall of Reach, James joins the Master Chief and Linda on a mission to a space station under heavy Covenant attack to secure a navigation database. However, James' thruster pack is hit by enemy weapons fire, sending him tumbling away into space uncontrollably. After returning to the Pillar of Autumn, the Master Chief has the ship scan for James, but there's no sign of him, leaving everyone to presume that he had died, although James is officially listed as missing in action.

In Halo: Empty Throne, James returns, now going by the name James Solomon. It's revealed that a patrol tug eventually recovered James' body after Reach's destruction and brought him to a secret ONI facility where James was revived. However, it took over a year for James to recover and by the time that he did, the war was already over. James has since become a private military contractor working for ONI and doing the jobs that ONI both didn't want to do and couldn't do because of the potential fallout, missions so hazardous and politically risky that ONI had to maintain complete deniability. Over time, James becomes disillusioned with his work and dreams of retiring to a small uncharted habitable moon that he had discovered which James names Suntéreó after the ancient Greek word for preserving something by keeping it close. However, James realizes that all he knows is war and he doesn't want to retire. In late 2559, ONI sends James after Chloe Hall, a young clone of Dr. Halsey who holds the key to controlling the Domain, causing several factions to chase after her. Bonding with the girl, James is fatally injured rescuing her from the Banished. Encountering the pair, James' old friend Adriana-111 agrees to report that they were both killed by the Banished. James helps Chloe escape on his ship, leaving her with his armor's helmet as a memento and his AI Lola to look after her. Surrounded by Banished, James detonates his armor's self-destruct in order to cover Chloe's escape. Following James' wishes, Lola takes the girl to Suntéreó where she will be safe from everyone chasing after her.

==== Sarah Palmer ====
Commander Sarah Palmer (Jennifer Hale) is a Spartan-IV stationed on UNSC Infinity and the leader of the Spartan IVs. She appears in Halo 4, Halo 5: Guardians, Halo: Spartan Assault, Halo: Shadows of Reach, and the Halo Escalation comic series.

==== Edward Buck ====
Gunnery Sergeant Edward Malcolm Buck (Nathan Fillion) is a longtime human soldier. In Halo 3: ODST he is the leader of Alpha-Nine, a squad of Orbital Drop Shock Troopers (ODSTs). He is subsequently inducted into the SPARTAN-IV program, and is a playable member of Fireteam Osiris in the video game Halo 5. He makes a brief appearance in Halo: Reach and is the main character of the novels Halo: New Blood and Halo: Bad Blood. In the latter, Buck reunites his old squad Alpha-Nine (minus "Rookie", who died during a previous mission in the timeskip between 3 and 4) for a classified ONI mission following the events of Halo 5. At the end of the novel, Buck decides to return to leading Alpha-Nine full-time and is married to long-time girlfriend Veronica Dare by Infinity's AI Roland.

==== Noble Six ====
SPARTAN-B312, also known by his call-sign Noble Six, is a Spartan III who is the main protagonist of Halo: Reach. B312 is the latest addition to Noble Team, a fireteam of fellow Spartan III's and one Spartan II that is stationed on Reach just prior to the events of Halo: Combat Evolved. His identity and background are highly classified due to his prior work with the ONI, and as he is transferred to Noble Team, the Covenant invades the planet. A solitary figure who prefers working alone and gains the nickname "Lone Wolf" as a result, Six earns the respect of his teammates despite their early resentment of him and plays a role in transferring crucial data to Cortana before she travels to Installation 04 on the Pillar of Autumn, also ensuring the ship's safe departure from Reach. However, most members of Noble Team, including Six, perish during the planet's fall to the Covenant and glassing. While characterized as a male in canon, the player can opt to characterize Noble Six as either male or female prior to playing the campaign of Halo: Reach. Six's male and female incarnations are voiced by Philip Anthony-Rodriguez and Amanda Philipson, respectively.

==== Jameson Locke ====
Jameson Locke is a Spartan IV who first appeared in Halo 2 Anniversary's both opening and ending with the task of hunting down the Master Chief in Halo 5: Guardians. Mike Colter portrays Locke in both Anniversary and the Nightfall origin movie, and only provided the motion-capture performance for the character in Guardians. Due to scheduling conflicts with Jessica Jones and Luke Cage, Locke's voice acting is replaced by Ike Amadi. He is the current squad leader of Fireteam Osiris, tasked with hunting down Master Chief and Blue Team. Locke kills Jul 'Mdama in single combat and helps the Arbiter defeat the last of the Jul's Covenant forces. In Halo Infinite, a Brute Chieftain on Zeta Halo named Hyperius can be seen wearing Locke's helmet and chest armor on his shoulder as a trophy. It remains unknown what Locke's current status is or whether he survived the encounter with Hyperius.

==== Olympia Vale ====
Olympia Vale (Laura Bailey) is a Spartan IV and member of Fireteam Osiris appearing in Halo 2: Anniversary, Halo: Hunters in the Dark, Halo 5, Halo: Bad Blood, Halo: Outcasts and Halo: Edge of Dawn. She is an anthropologist and xenoarcheologist who is particularly adept in Sangheili and Forerunner culture and has also served as a professional diplomat.

In Halo: Hunters in the Dark, Vale is sent as a part of a joint UNSC-Swords of Sanghelios task force to the Ark to stop the activation of the Halo Array. Vale is abducted by the Ark's Monitor Tragic Solitude and attempts to convince him to stop, eventually forcing the Monitor to call off his invasion of Earth. Tragic Solitude was subsequently destroyed by Bobby Kodiak and her actions during the battle resulted in Vale's recruitment into the Spartan IV program.

In Halo 5, Vale appears as a member of the elite Fireteam Osiris, helping to kill Jul 'Mdama and fight the Covenant and the Created on Sangheilios and Genesis. Vale often provides insight into the Sangheili culture experienced by the team.

In Halo: Outcasts, Vale's friend Keely Iyuska discovers the existence of a possible weapon capable of destroying the Guardians on Netherop, a planet previously visited by the Spartan-IIs over thirty years before. This leads to a race for the weapon between the UNSC, the Swords of Sanghelios and the Banished. Encountering Covenant survivors of the battle from thirty years before, Vale kills most of them single-handedly. Discovering just how destructive the weapon really is, the UNSC forces the Arbiter's people agree to split it into pieces and give part of it to the Banished while Vale convinces Iyuska to keep quiet about her discovery.

In Halo: Edge of Dawn, taking place shortly after the events of Halo Infinite, the Arbiter recalls Vale from a planned joint operation to reveal that he has received a UNSC distress call revealing the location of Zeta Halo and the fact that the Infinity -- now missing for six months -- had been attacked by the Banished when it went to stop Cortana. The two agree that this changes everything, opening up the chance of UNSC and Swords of Sangheilios reinforcements for the UNSC forces stranded on Zeta Halo.

=== Orbital Drop Shock Troopers (ODST) ===
The Orbital Drop Shock Troopers are an elite special ops component of the UNSC Marine Corps, distinguished by their unique deployment from space onto planetary surfaces through entry-vehicles nicknamed "drop pods", similar to paratroopers. A battalion of ODSTs, codenamed Alpha-Nine, are the primary focus of Halo 3: ODST, with Edward Buck serving as the squad commander and the player assuming the role of "The Rookie" on the squad. Several ODSTs, including Antonio Silva, have a disdain for the Spartan IIs and their abilities, likely stemming from an incident when a 14-year-old John-117 accidentally killed two ODSTs while defending himself from being bullied.

== Covenant ==
=== High Prophets ===
Two of the Hierarchs, Regret (left) and Truth (right), consult

High Prophets, or Hierarchs, are the supreme leaders of the theocratic Covenant. Upon assuming office, each Hierarch picks a new regnal name from a list of names of former Hierarchs, similar to the practice of some Orthodox Patriarchs. In Halo 2, there are shown to be only three; the Prophets of Truth, Mercy, and Regret (voiced by Michael Wincott, Hamilton Camp and Robin Atkin Downes in Halo 2, respectively; in Halo 3, Truth is voiced by Terence Stamp). The novel Halo: Contact Harvest reveals that these three Prophets, originally known as the Minister of Fortitude, the Vice-Minister of Tranquility, and the Philologist, plotted to usurp the throne of the Hierarchs; in the process, they hide the truth that humanity is descended from the Covenant gods, the Forerunners, believing that the revelation could shatter the Covenant. During the course of Halo 2, Regret attacks Earth, and then retreats to Delta Halo. There, he calls for reinforcements, but is killed by the Master Chief. Later, Mercy is attacked by the Flood on High Charity; Truth could have saved him, but left him to die so he could have full control over the Covenant. In Halo 3: ODST, Truth is seen inspecting some Engineers around the Forerunner construct near New Mombasa. In Halo 3, Truth also meets his demise at the hands of the Arbiter when the Prophet attempts to activate all the Halo rings from the Ark. His death becomes the culmination of the Covenant's downfall.

Preliminary designs for the Prophets, including the Hierarchs, were done by artist Shi Kai Wang. According to The Art of Halo, the Prophets were designed to look feeble, yet sinister. Originally, the Prophets appeared to be fused to the special hovering thrones they use for transport; even in the final designs, the Prophets are made to be dependent on their technology. Special headdresses, stylized differently for each of the Hierarchs, adds personality to the aliens and a regal presence.

=== Arbiter ===
The Arbiter is a rank given to special Covenant Elite soldiers who undertake suicidal missions on behalf of the Hierarchs to gain honor upon their death. They are revered amongst the Covenant for their bravery and skills. In Halo 2, the rank of Arbiter is given to Thel 'Vadamee, the disgraced former Supreme Commander of the Fleet of Particular Justice, which was responsible for destroying Reach. It was under his watch that Installation 04(Alpha Halo) was destroyed in Halo: Combat Evolved and the Ascendant Justice was captured by the Master Chief in Halo: First Strike. Rather than killing him, the Prophets allow the Commander to become the Arbiter, and to carry on his missions as the "Blade of the Prophets". Eventually, the Arbiter rebels against the Prophets during the Great Schism by dropping the "-ee" suffix from his surname as a symbol of his resignation from the Covenant, and joins his fellow Elites in siding with humanity and stopping the Halo array from firing. Some of his backstory is featured in Halo: The Cole Protocol set about fifteen years before Combat Evolved where the Arbiter, then Shipmaster Thel 'Vadamee, comes into conflict with UNSC forces led by then-Lieutenant Jacob Keyes. The events sow the seeds of doubt in the future Arbiter's mind about the Prophets and their plans. This particular Arbiter is voiced by Keith David; the Arbiter that appears in Halo Wars is voiced by David Sobolov.

Originally to be named "Dervish," the Arbiter was a playable character intended to be a major plot twist. Reception to the character was lukewarm, with critics alternatively praising the added dimension brought by the Arbiter, or criticizing the sudden twist.

=== Rtas 'Vadum ===
Making his debut in Halo 2, Special Ops Commander Rtas 'Vadum is never named in the game itself, leading to the unofficial nickname of "Half-Jaw" by fans, due to the missing mandibles on the left side of his face. With the release of The Halo Graphic Novel, however, the character was finally named in the story Last Voyage of the Infinite Succor as Rtas 'Vadumee. The character is voiced by Robert Davi.

'Vadum, originally 'Vadumee before the Covenant Civil War, is a veteran Covenant Elite and the second most prominent Elite character in the series after the Arbiter. He carries the Covenant rank of Shipmaster. The Last Voyage of the Infinite Succor explains how he loses his left mandibles; he is injured after fighting one of his friends, who was infected by the Flood. During the early events of Halo 2, 'Vadumee serves as a messenger between the Hierarchs and the Elite Council, as he is seen relaying messages between the two parties in the Prophets' chamber. Surviving the Prophets' betrayal, 'Vadumee joins his brethren in fighting the Brutes, dropping the "-ee" suffix from his surname to symbolize his resignation from the Covenant. 'Vadum aids the Arbiter in attacking a Brute base to capture a Scarab before departing to take control of a nearby Covenant ship.

In Halo 3, 'Vadum is Shipmaster of the Swords of Sanghelios flagship Shadow of Intent, and supports Cortana's plan to follow Truth to the Ark. Along with the Arbiter, 'Vadum leaves Earth to return to the Elite's homeworld with the end of the war. Rtas 'Vadum is known for being a quick, smart, and ingenious tactician and an unparalleled fighter, especially with an Energy Sword and is an excellent leader. He expresses great care for his soldiers. He is eager to exact revenge on the Brutes after the Great Schism.

'Vadum appears in the novella Halo: Shadow of Intent taking place after the war. Still the Shipmaster of the Shadow of Intent, 'Vadum protects Sangheili space and comes into conflict with a Covenant splinter faction led by two surviving Prophets, Prelate Tem'Bhetek and the Minister of Preparation Boru'a'Neem. The Prelate is shown to have a personal grudge against 'Vadum, blaming him for the death of his family when High Charity fell to the Flood and 'Vadum had the city partially glassed in a failed effort to contain the Flood. After capturing the Prelate, 'Vadum shows sympathy for him and reveals that the Prelate's family may well have been alive when the Prelate departed the city, meaning that Preparation lied to him. 'Vadum's words shake the Prelate's faith in Preparation who is revealed to be planning to use a prototype Halo ring to destroy Sanghelios using the Shadow of Intent to power it. The Prelate sacrifices himself to stop Preparation, leaving 'Vadum with a new outlook following the encounter. Along with getting the Arbiter to relax age-old rules not allowing females to serve in the military, 'Vadum reveals that he plans to use navigation data recovered from the Prelate's ship to seek out the rest of the Prophets and attempt to determine who should be punished as war criminals and who should be pardoned to coexist in peace as innocents.

In Halo: Empty Throne, 'Vadum has spent years hunting down the Prophets with some success. With the rise of the Order of Restoration under High Lord Dovo Nesto seeking to restore the Covenant, 'Vadum and his crew work alongside Captain Abigail Cole and the Spartan Gray Team to stop them. In the years since the end of the war, 'Vadum's opinion of and relationship with humanity has only grown to the point that he learned to speak English without translation technology -- a rare talent possessed by only a few such as the Arbiter -- to communicate more naturally with his allies. The Shadow of Intent joins with the UNSC Victory of Samothrace to stop the Banished, Order of Restoration and Sali 'Nyon's Covenant faction from taking control of a Domain entry point on the human colony of Boundary. During the battle, Vul 'Soran, one of 'Vadum's most trusted friends betrays the Swords of Sanghelios to join forces with Nesto. Afterwards, the Shadow of Intent is assigned to work with Gray Team to hunt down Nesto and 'Vadum offers comfort and advice to Tul 'Juran who had lost her family to the Prelate and is also struggling with 'Soran's betrayal.

=== Tartarus ===
Tartarus (voiced by Kevin Michael Richardson) is the Chieftain of the Brutes, easily recognized by his white hair, distinctive mohawk, and massive gravity hammer known as the "Fist of Rukt". Rough, arrogant, and disdainful of the Elites, Tartarus is completely dedicated to the Prophets' salvific "Great Journey". Halo: Contact Harvest reveals that Tartarus became Chieftain after killing the former Chieftain, his uncle Maccabeus, and seizing the Chieftain's weapon. In Contact Harvest, Tartarus acts as one of the main antagonists, working to destroy the human colony of Harvest and coming into conflict with Sergeant Johnson. During the final battle of the novel, Johnson's life is inadvertently saved when one of Tartarus' own soldiers turns against him, damaging Tartarus' armor and forcing him to retreat. Tartarus makes his first appearance in the novel Halo: First Strike, as one of the first Brutes allowed into the chamber of the High Prophet of Truth. In Halo 2, Tartarus acts as an agent of the Prophets, branding the Arbiter for his failures. The Chieftain later appears when the Arbiter tries to retrieve the Activation Index of Delta Halo. On the Prophets' orders, Tartarus takes the Index and pushes the Arbiter to what was intended to be his death in a deep chasm. Tartarus heads to the control room of Halo with the Index in order to activate Halo, but is confronted by the Arbiter. Blind to the Prophets' deception about the Great Journey, Tartarus activates the ring; the Brute is ultimately killed by the coordinated efforts of the Arbiter with the help of Sergeant Major Johnson, successfully preventing the firing of Delta Halo.

Designs for Tartarus began after the basic shape and design of the common Brutes was complete. Artist Shi Kai Wang added small but distinctive changes to Tartarus' armor and mane in order to distinguish the Chieftain from the other Brutes. The visual design of the Chieftains was later modified for Halo 3, with the seasoned warriors sporting more elaborate headdresses and shoulder pads. In a review of the character, UGO Networks noted that whereas the Elites "are a precision scalpel," Tartarus was a "baseball bat" that smashes everything in its path, a reference to their ceremonial weapons, the Energy Sword and Gravity Hammer, respectively.

=== Jul 'Mdama ===
Jul 'Mdama (voiced by David Sobolov in Halo 4 and Travis Willingham in Halo 5: Guardians) was the Supreme Leader of a newly formed Covenant splinter faction following the defeat of the Covenant Empire in Halo 3. Calling himself "the Didact's Hand," Jul's faction initially seeks the Forerunner warrior Didact as an ally against humanity. The character appears in Karen Traviss' Kilo-5 trilogy of novels, as well as Halo 4 and Halo 5: Guardians. It was revealed in Halo: Escalation that Jul 'Mdama's faction was only one of many factions self-proclaiming to be a new "Covenant".

First appearing in the Kilo-Five trilogy, Jul is depicted as a member of the Servants of the Abiding Truth, a religious Covenant splinter faction that is opposed to the Arbiter and his emerging Swords of Sanghelios government. The Servants attempt to defeat the Arbiter ended in catastrophe thanks to the intervention of the UNSC Infinity in the battle. Jul was subsequently captured by the Kilo-Five black ops team and imprisoned on the Forerunner shield world of Onyx. Jul eventually escaped using one of the shield world's slipspace portals and traveled to the Sangheili colony world of Hesduros. By portraying his experiences on the shield world in a religious light, Jul was able to win over the inhabitants, but learned that his wife had been killed. Grief-stricken and blaming humanity, Jul discovered the coordinates to the shield world of Requiem on Hesduros and began building up a massive following, forming a new Sangheili-led Covenant. Jul's Covenant eventually found Requiem, but were trapped outside for three years as depicted in the Halo 4 Terminals because the planet required the presence of a Reclaimer(human) to open.

In Halo 4, the Master Chief arrives at Requiem in the rear half of the Forward Unto Dawn and comes into conflict with Jul and his forces. The Master Chief's presence causes Requiem to finally open, granting Jul's Covenant access to the planet. Jul eventually leads some of his forces into Requiem's core where the Forerunner known as the Didact is imprisoned. The Didact is able to trick the Master Chief into releasing him and Jul bows down before him. Despite the core's subsequent collapse, Jul manages to escape with his life and allies himself with the Didact against the humans from the Infinity. Subsequent to this, Jul brands himself "the Didact's Hand" with his status and ability to control the Prometheans giving him even more power and attracting more followers to his cause.

In Spartan Ops, six months after the Battle of Requiem, the Infinity returns to Requiem which is still occupied by Jul and his Covenant. The forces of the Infinity and Jul's forces battle each other for control over the planet while Jul personally leads the attempt to access the Librarian's AI which Jul wants to use for the power that the Librarian can give to him. In Halo: Escalation, Jul and Halsey work together while Jul faces a mutiny inside of his own forces. Their mission to access the Absolute Record of Forerunner Installations, however, fails.

In Halo 5: Guardians, Jul's power has begun to break following all of his defeats and his Prometheans turning against him under the influence of Cortana. On the remote world of Kamchatka, Jul attempts to access the Forerunner Domain with the help of Halsey while his loyal forces battle the Prometheans. However, Jul is unaware that Halsey has betrayed his location to the UNSC due to the threat Cortana poses. He is killed by Spartan Jameson Locke in single combat and Jul's Covenant falls apart soon thereafter.

In Halo: Legacy of Onyx, Jul's two sons are left on the opposing sides of an ongoing conflict on the Onyx shield world. Dural, now the leader of the Servants of the Abiding Truth, believes the Covenant to truly be gone with the death of his father and the destruction of his faction despite the existence of other ex-Covenant splinter factions in the galaxy.

=== Sali 'Nyon ===
Sali 'Nyon is the leader of a newly formed Covenant splinter faction following the defeat of the Covenant Empire in Halo 3. Originally a member of Jul 'Mdama's faction, 'Nyon eventually rebels against Jul, claiming to be the true "Didact's Hand."

In Halo: Escalation comic series, 'Nyon's increasing questioning of Jul's leadership and alliance with Dr. Catherine Halsey leads to him breaking away from Jul's faction during the Battle of Aktis IV. Seizing the UNSC's half of the Janus Key, 'Nyon declares himself to be the true Didact's Hand and then broadcast a message across Jul's fleet, inciting them to rebellion. However, one of 'Nyon's men stole the Janus Key and betrayed him to Jul's forces. Most if not all of 'Nyon's forces were killed, and 'Nyon himself was imprisoned by Jul aboard his flagship, the Song of Retribution, before being transported to the damaged Breath of Annihilation. During the events at the Absolute Record, 'Nyon is released by ONI operative Ayit 'Sevi as a distraction, allowing 'Nyon to lead a rebellion aboard the ship and seize the assault carrier and its collection of Forerunner artifacts for himself. 'Nyon then escapes into Sangheili space to rally support for his faction, briefly engaging Jul who is unable to retake the Breath of Annihilation.

'Nyon is mentioned in Halo 5 following Jul's death. Some Sangheili, including some of the Arbiter's own men, are shown to view him as a true leader in comparison to the Arbiter or Jul and the next best chance for a new Covenant.

In Halo: Empty Throne, 'Nyon has formed an alliance with Dovo Nesto, a surviving Prophet who seeks to resurrect the Covenant Empire. Nesto claims to one of his followers that the threat of Cortana caused 'Nyon to side with him, but in reality, Nesto has promised 'Nyon a place at his side in the restored Covenant as the head of the military. By this point, 'Nyon has amassed a significant following and plays a key role in Nesto's plans to seize control of the Domain for himself. However, this puts 'Nyon at odds with Severan, the son of Tartarus and a Banished War Chief who was made the same promise by Nesto, leading to a massive three-way battle between the UNSC, the Banished, and 'Nyon's faction. In a final duel, 'Nyon is defeated and decapitated by Severan who is prevented from doing the same to Nesto by a Swords of Sanghelios traitor. With 'Nyon dead, Nesto takes control of 'Nyon's faction and its considerable resources to continue his efforts to rebuild the Covenant.

=== Ayit 'Sevi ===
A Sangheili mercenary who secretly works as an ONI operative, serving as a spy amongst the various Covenant remnant factions. Admiral Serin Osman explains the choice of 'Sevi as being because unlike a typical Sangheili who focus on honor and overt and direct aggression, 'Sevi is a deviant who focuses more on self-preservation and deception. In essence, ONI had chosen the most human Sangheili that they could find.

In the Halo: Escalation comic series, 'Sevi is first seen retrieving a bioweapon from a Kig-Yar pirate faction with his presence inciting the UNSC Infinity to get involved in the conflict after Osman lies that 'Sevi is an operative of Jul 'Mdama's Covenant faction. 'Sevi comes into conflict with Spartans Gabriel Thorne and Naiya Ray as they work to retrieve the bioweapon. After the Infinity destroys the pirate base using nuclear weapons, 'Sevi is extracted by ONI, revealing him to be their agent. Captain Thomas Lasky later realizes that ONI had staged the incident in order to force the Infinity to act against the pirates, a threat which the UNSC had been ignoring. 'Sevi later plays a pivotal role in the battle for the Absolute Record, helping Thorne, Sarah Palmer, Holly Tanaka and Dr. Henry Glassman to infiltrate one of Jul's assault carriers and then later releasing Sali 'Nyon as a distraction, leading to infighting amongst the Covenant forces. After the mission, 'Sevi hides the team on the carrier until he is able to help them escape to a rendezvous with an ONI Prowler.

In Halo: Empty Throne, 'Sevi is present when Prophet Dovo Nesto takes control of 'Nyon's faction to continue his mission of rebuilding the Covenant Empire. Recognized as the one who had released 'Nyon from his imprisonment, allowing 'Nyon to build up a significant force, 'Sevi is trusted by Nesto who allows him to hear Nesto discussing his next plans. 'Sevi later transmits a report on these developments to Admiral Jilan al-Cygni who plans to rendezvous with him.

=== Nizat 'Kvarosee ===
Nizat 'Kvarosee is a former Covenant Fleetmaster appearing in Halo: Silent Storm, Halo: Oblivion and Halo: Outcasts. Cunning and intelligent, Nizat was one of humanity's first Covenant enemies before going rogue in his efforts to destroy humanity.

In Halo: Silent Storm, taking place near the start of the war between humanity and the Covenant, Nizat is the Fleetmaster of the Covenant Fleet of Inexorable Obedience. In this role, Nizat destroys a number of human colonies and clashes with the Spartans under the leadership of John-117 during Operation: SILENT STORM where the Spartans try to buy humanity time to adapt to their new enemy by striking at the Covenant behind enemy lines using board-and-destroy tactics. Human insurrectionists, hoping to use the Covenant to destroy the UNSC, provide Nizat and his forces with information on the Spartans, their armor, and their tactics, allowing Nizat to adapt his own strategies to match. Despite this, the UNSC successfully launches a massive attack on the Covenant world of Zhoist, destroying two cities, an important fleet support station, kill the special forces sent after them and decimates Nizat's fleet. Throughout these events, Nizat grows more and more annoyed with the Minor Minister of Artifact Survey who is assigned to oversee his fleet, but Survey acts more and more irrational as time goes on, causing Nizat to consider killing him several times despite the almost certain death sentence that it would bring upon himself. After the Battle of Zhoist, Nizat's steward Tam 'Lakosee kills Survey for his irrational and disrespectful behavior, but Nizat decides to cover it up in order to protect his subordinate.

In Halo: Oblivion, taking place a few months after Halo: Silent Storm, Nizat has gone rogue from the Covenant following the decimation of his fleet by the Spartans. Recalled to High Charity by the Prophets, Nizat had insisted that ONI is the true danger and they needed to target and destroy it, but he is blamed for the losses suffered by the Covenant and sentenced to execution, forcing Nizat to flee with his loyal followers. Assembling a small fleet, Nizat enacts an elaborate plan to plant a beacon on ONI that will lead his forces to it for destruction by using a Covenant frigate as bait on the barely inhabitable world of Netherop, the site of one of the earliest skirmishes in Operation: SILENT STORM. Nizat successfully lures the Spartans to Netherop and plants the beacon on a corpse that they take back for study, evading detection as the true mastermind of the plot. However, the Covenant retaliates for Nizat's actions, decimating his fleet and exiling Nizat on Netherop alongside his surviving ground forces, creating an orbital mine shell in order to prevent anyone from ever coming back to the planet again, especially any of Nizat's surviving commanders looking to rescue him. Lieutenant Commander Amalea Petrov and several other UNSC soldiers are stranded as well, but Nizat remains certain that his surviving forces will carry out his plan in Nizat's absence.

In Halo: Outcasts, the UNSC returns to Netherop alongside the Swords of Sanghelios in search of a weapon capable of destroying Cortana's Guardians. After dismantling the orbital mine shell, the Arbiter discovers that Nizat and Petrov are both still alive and waging war against each other thirty-three years after they were stranded on the planet. However, Nizat has control of the weapon that both sides seek, dubbed the Divine Hand, which proves to be a Precursor weapon used by Precursor fugitives during the war of extermination that the Forerunners had waged against their creators. A side effect of using the weapon was the transformation of Netherop from a lush world into a barren wasteland. Four of Nizat's soldiers are killed by Spartan Olympia Vale and the Sangheili while another one defects and Nizat and Tam are captured. With Nizat and Tam proving to be fanatical beyond reason, Nizat in particular, the Arbiter decides to maroon them once again on Netherop when the UNSC forces, now including a rescued Petrov and her people, and the Swords of Sanghelios leave. Already severely wounded and weakened, Nizat develops an infection and he and Tam are left facing an inevitable death. So as to spare his friend from that fate, Tam chooses to mercy kill Nizat with his energy sword.

== Banished ==
=== Atriox ===
Atriox, voiced by John DiMaggio in Halo Wars 2 and Ike Amadi in Halo Infinite, is the Brute who founded and leads the mercenary organization known as the Banished. Having fought for the Covenant during the Human-Covenant War, Atriox grew disgruntled with the alien empire as his Brute brothers were carelessly used as cannon fodder by their Elite masters, a species who had a feuding rivalry with them due to the Brute's strength and aggression challenging their superior status. He also appears in the Halo TV series as a member of the Covenant.

In Halo: Rise of Atriox, he is shown as a Covenant soldier fighting against the UNSC Marines during the war. Atriox chases down a Marine and expresses to him how meaningless he finds the war against the human species to be as his brothers die. With no hatred for humanity, Atriox quickly kills the Marine to complete his mission. Another Brute then reveals that he was spying on Atriox and declares him a heretic for renouncing the Covenant, resulting in Atriox killing him too. Having murdered one of his own and spoken against the Covenant religion, Atriox is sent to be executed by his Elite superiors. Atriox rebels against his punishment, killing the Elite executioner, inspiring a Brute named Decimus and others to overthrow the other Elites in the area. Atriox forms the Banished with them, and leaves the Covenant.

Atriox is shown recruiting more members to the Banished in Hunting Party from Halo: Tales From Slipspace. He is willing to hire from all species, including Elites and humans. Following the Great Schism, a civil war that tore the Covenant apart, a squad of Elite assassins known as the Silent Shadow embarked on a genocidal campaign against the Brutes for revenge. The Silent Shadow squad kills the Brute crew on Atriox's ship until they encounter him. Atriox tells the Elites that he and his Brutes were not responsible for the Great Schism and that they also hate the Covenant. The leader of the squad still expresses hatred to Atriox for being a Brute, to which Atriox responds that "vengeance is petty" and that "vengeance has no reward". The Silent Shadow squad reluctantly kill their leader, and join the Banished as mercenaries.

Halo: The Official Spartan Field Manual further details Atriox's openness to recruiting humans, as well as how his Brutes Chieftains have spread their influence into Brute colonies as well as human criminal enterprises. In Halo: Divine Wind, several Banished humans are mentioned to have accompanied Atriox on his voyage to the Forerunner world known as the Ark.

In Halo Wars 2, Atriox, who had taken over the Ark, reveals himself to Spartan-II Red Team of the UNSC Ship Spirit of Fire who had just arrived. Atriox attacks the Spartans and lets them escape, sending his Banished forces to chase after them. A prolonged battle for territory ensues between the crew of the Spirit of Fire and Atriox's forces. Having lost Decimus and his flagship in the battle, Atriox expresses respect to his enemy for their tenacity, and offers them a chance to leave peacefully rather than be hunted down. Captain Cutter of the Spirit of Fire refuses and successfully captures a Halo ring, recently created by the Ark, from the Banished.

In Halo: Shadows of Reach, Atriox manages to make contact with his forces in the Milky Way, instructing them to find a Forerunner slipspace portal on the former human colony of Reach. After the portal is activated by the Keepers of the One Freedom – another former Covenant faction allied with the Banished – with the help of their human acolytes, Atriox is able to use the shards of the Forerunner crystal recovered in Halo: First Strike to connect the portal to the Ark and fly through it to Reach in a Banished Lich. Rather than using the portal to bring more reinforcements back to the Ark, Atriox departs to attend to a greater purpose, leaving behind his troops on the Ark to hold it in his absence. The fanatically religious Keepers steal Atriox's Lich to travel to the Ark and fire the Halos while Veta Lopis – undercover amongst the Keepers – passes a warning to the UNSC that Atriox has returned.

In Halo: Outcasts, Atriox seeks a weapon on Netherop that he had learned about on the Ark capable of destroying Cortana's Guardians. Atriox races the UNSC, the Swords of Sanghelios and the Created to the weapon. Deeming the weapon to be too dangerous for either of their people to ever use, the Arbiter and Olympia Vale feign surrender and hand it over to Atriox in the hopes that the Banished will destroy themselves with it if they can figure out how to get it working.

In Halo Infinite, Atriox faces the Master Chief in battle on board the UNSC Infinity and defeats him, ultimately throwing the Spartan off of the ship. When the Master Chief is rescued six months later, he discovers that Atriox and his forces have destroyed the Infinity and nearly wiped out all of the UNSC forces on Installation 07. However, Atriox himself is believed to be dead, having apparently been killed when Cortana destroyed a section of the ring in order to stop him from using it. Through echoes of Cortana's memories, the Master Chief learns that the AI had approached Atriox as a representative of his species and destroyed his homeworld when he refused to surrender to her, provoking the Banished leader to seek out a UNSC AI known as the Weapon in order to defeat Cortana. After seeing the consequences of her actions, Cortana sacrificed herself to make things right by stopping the remorseless Atriox. However, Atriox is revealed to have secretly survived and he locates the Endless, a threat imprisoned by the Forerunners long ago on the ring.

In the Halo TV series, a Brute highly speculated by fans to be Atriox and referred to as such by series creator David J. Peterson is introduced as a Covenant military leader, facing off against the Master Chief and Silver Team twice.

=== Pavium ===
Pavium, voiced by T.J. Storm, is a Jiralhanae Warlord, the brother of Voridus, and the leader of the Clan of the Long Shields appearing in the Awakening the Nightmare DLC of Halo Wars 2 and Halo: Divine Wind.

In Awakening the Nightmare, Pavium and Voridus are ordered by Atriox to scavenge around the remains of High Charity, but are explicitly ordered not to go in. Disregarding Atriox's orders, the brothers breach the containment shield, accidentally releasing the Flood upon the Ark once more. Pavium and Voridus lead the Banished defense against the Flood, managing to reactivate the Ark's defenses and kill a Proto-Gravemind, allowing the Banished and the Sentinels to emerge victorious. A furious Atriox reprimands the brothers for their actions and orders them to clean up their mess.

In Halo: Divine Wind, its mentioned that Atriox spared Pavium and Voridus because Voridus managed to get a Forerunner communications system working for long enough for Atriox to send a message to Escharum, setting up the Banished leader's return to the Milky Way galaxy. The two intercept a message from the Ferrets warning that the newly arrived Keepers of the One Freedom and Dhas 'Bhasvod's Covenant faction intend to activate the Halo rings from the Ark. Seeing this as a chance to redeem their clan, Pavium, Voridus and the Clan of the Long Shields battle the combined Keeper and Covenant forces to stop their plans, but the clan is nearly completely wiped out in the process with the Keepers and the Covenant similarly suffering massive casualties. After the Spirit of Fire destroys the only facility on the Ark capable of firing Halo, Pavium and Voridus decide to claim that they held the Keepers off long enough for the Spirit of Fire to attack, knowing that there's no one left to contradict them. During this time, Pavium faces a challenge from Thalazan who sees an opportunity to compete with the disgraced Warlord for leadership. At the end, the only known survivors of the Clan of the Long Shields are Pavium, Vordius and possibly Thalazan.

=== Voridus ===
Voridus, voiced by Ashley Bagwell, is a Jiralhanae, the brother of Pavium, and part of the Clan of the Long Shields appearing in the Awakening the Nightmare DLC of Halo Wars 2 and Halo: Divine Wind.

In Awakening the Nightmare, Pavium and Voridus are ordered by Atriox to scavenge around the remains of High Charity, but are explicitly ordered not to go in. Disregarding Atriox's orders, the brothers breach the containment shield, accidentally releasing the Flood upon the Ark once more. Pavium and Voridus lead the Banished defense against the Flood, managing to reactivate the Ark's defenses and kill a Proto-Gravemind, allowing the Banished and the Sentinels to emerge victorious. A furious Atriox reprimands the brothers for their actions and orders them to clean up their mess.

=== Escharum ===
Escharum, voiced by Darin De Paul, is the War Chief of the Banished and Atriox's old mentor appearing in Halo: Shadows of Reach, Halo Infinite, Halo: The Rubicon Protocol and Halo: Empty Throne.

In Halo: Shadows of Reach, Escharum coordinates an effort by the Banished to find a slipspace portal on Reach in order to return Atriox to the Milky Way galaxy from where he's stranded on the Ark, having received a message with instructions from Atriox months earlier. By following Blue Team, Castor and the Keepers of the One Freedom are successfully able to locate the slipspace portal and open it, allowing Atriox to return in a Banished Lich with several of his top warriors. Escharum is outraged by Castor's hijacking of the Lich, but on Atriox's instruction, he departs with his men deeper into the Forerunner installation, allowing Castor and his men to depart in Atriox's ship. As a Guardian approaches, drawn by the activation of the slipspace portal, Escharum's intrusion corvette extracts Escharum, Atriox and his men and they flee from Reach to attend to a greater purpose of some kind.

In Halo Infinite, six months after the defeat of the UNSC at Installation 07, Escharum is now the leader of the Banished following Atriox's apparent death at Cortana's hands. Working with a mysterious being known as the Harbinger, Escharum seeks to release the Endless from their millennia-long imprisonment by the Forerunners on the Halo ring with the Harbinger in return agreeing to help the Banished repair and fire the ring. Appearing to the Master Chief in the form of holographic transmissions throughout his journey, Escharum introduces himself and taunts the Master Chief, challenging him to a final fight between the Spartan and the old War Chief which Escharum calls "a true test of legends." By kidnapping the pilot of Echo 216, 'Rdomnai lures the Master Chief to Escharum's base where the Master Chief seemingly kills 'Rdomnai and engages in a final battle with Escharum, mortally wounding him. Dying, Escharum proclaims that his passing will only inspire others and he requests that the Master Chief tell the Banished that he had died well. The Master Chief holds Escharum as passes away, surprising the pilot with the respect that he gave to Escharum in his final moments as Escharum was a monster. The Master Chief states that while Escharum was a monster, in the end, he was also a soldier, questioning his choices and hoping that he did the right thing.

In Halo: Empty Throne, following the destruction of Doisac, Escharum orders War Chief Severan to destroy Earth in retaliation while Atriox and Escharum go to Zeta Halo.

In Halo: Edge of Dawn, taking place immediately after the end of Halo Infinite, the Banished have been thrown into chaos by the death of Escharum and the power vacuum that it left. The upper echelons of the Banished gather at the House of Reckoning for Escharum's funeral which is led by Jega 'Rdomnai who had survived his wounds. After Escharum's body is cremated, the four top remaining Banished commanders argue over what to do next, falling back into their base instincts without the guiding influence of Atriox and Escharum. Taking advantage of this, the Master Chief uses a small-scale nuclear weapon to destroy the House of Reckoning and prevent a new leader from rising from the ashes, although some of the Banished may have escaped the blast due to them pursuing a fleeing 'Rdomnai.

=== Jega 'Rdomnai ===
Jega 'Rdomnai, voiced by Noshir Dalal, is a Covenant and later Banished Blademaster appearing in Halo: Evolutions, Halo Infinite, Halo: The Rubicon Protocol and Halo: Edge of Dawn. In Halo: Evolutions, the character is unnamed when he appears, but Halo: Edge of Dawn confirms that it was supposed to be Jega.

Jega first appears as an unnamed Covenant Silent Shadow Blademaster in the Halo: Evolutions short story Headhunters. Jega and his Silent Shadow unit confront two Spartan Headhunters, ending with one blowing up the area, killing himself and apparently all of the Covenant forces in range. As revealed in Halo: Edge of Dawn, Jega survived the blast, but was left severely wounded. Jega was rescued by Escharum and the Banished and took cybernetic replacements for his missing mandible and left arm. Although the Sangheili are all about honor and typically refuse medical care, Jega becomes ruthless and willing to do anything to achieve his revenge and wipe out the Spartans as a whole. While the Sangheili and Jiralhanae are traditionally enemies or at the very least rivals, Jega and Escharum develop a close friendship with each other.

In Halo Infinite, Jega serves as Escharum's right-hand man on Zeta Halo, physically rebuking Tremonius for his disrespect and following the Master Chief in secret across the ring. Jega expresses his growing concern for Escharum's worsening illness and kidnaps the pilot of Echo 216 to lure the Master Chief into a trap at the House of Reckoning. On the fourth level, Jega ambushes the Master Chief using his cloak extensively to his advantage. In the end, the Master Chief emerges victorious, apparently killing Jega. Notably, however, Jega's body mysteriously vanishes when he falls, leaving behind only his energy sword.

In Halo: The Rubicon Protocol, taking place during the six months that the Master Chief was adrift unconscious in space, Jega serves as Escharum's right hand and leads an attack on the boat crew as they try to send a distress call into human space. With the help of one of the installation's submonitors, part of the boat crew manages to escape from Jega's onslaught after successfully sending their message.

In Halo: Edge of Dawn, taking place after Halo Infinite, Jega is revealed to be still alive, having barely survived his fight with the Master Chief due to Jega's internal cybernetics, including a cybernetic heart and lung and healing nanobots. Jega leads Escharum's funeral and argues with the four high-ranking Banished commanders gathered to decide who will lead the Banished next about their next steps. After revealing Lucas Browning in his possession, Jega is forced to flee when the other commanders realize that he's trying to use Browning to take the Harbinger's secrets for himself. Once Jega is gone, the Master Chief obliterates the House of Reckoning and the Banished gathered there with a small-scale nuclear weapon in order to keep a new leader from rising to take Escharum's place. Following Jega back to his base, Rdomnai Keep, the Master Chief rescues Browning. Hoping that a new tactic will get him the answers that he seeks, Jega allows them to escape, while secretly tracking Browning and occasionally attacking to prod the Master Chief into continuing. Jega eventually follows them to the Silent Auditorium where he collects the Harbinger's body and a Huragok who, like Browning, has a compulsion to serve the Harbinger. Jega fatally stabs Browning and leaves behind forces to kill the Master Chief. However, with the help of Fernando Esparza and four Swords of Sangheilos warriors, the Master Chief kills Jega's forces and escapes with the dying Browning. Days later, the Huragok informs Jega that the Monitor's encephalon -- the key to controlling Zeta Halo's systems -- is no longer on the Harbinger, having been taken by the Master Chief's AI.

=== Severan ===
War Chief of the clan Vanguard of Zaladon, Severan is the son of Tartarus and appears in Halo: Empty Throne.

In Halo: Empty Throne, Severan is a Banished War Chief and the only surviving child of Tartarus, his siblings having been killed by their enemies following Tartarus' death at the hands of the Arbiter and Sergeant Johnson. Severan learns of the UNSC Infinity's mission to Zeta Halo from a captured ONI operative and alerts Atriox, allowing Atriox to ambush humanity's flagship at Zeta Halo. Atriox places Severan in charge of the vast Banished forces that do not accompany the Warmaster to Zeta Halo. Shortly thereafter, it's revealed that Severan is actually secretly loyal to High Lord Dovo Nesto, a surviving Prophet who seeks to resurrect the Covenant. Through Severan, Nesto bends the vast resources of the Banished to his cause. Under Escharum's orders, Severan attacks Earth with over a thousand ships, intending to destroy it in retaliation for the destruction of his homeworld by Cortana. However, following Cortana's destruction and the sudden deactivation of the Guardians, Severan retreats to Boundary to pursue the Lithos, a gateway that will allow Nesto to seize control of the Domain, coming into conflict with the UNSC and the Swords of Sanghelios in the process. After discovering that Nesto has formed an alliance with Sali 'Nyon and his Covenant faction, Severan realizes that Nesto is only using him and turns on his former master. The resulting battle and an orbital strike by the UNSC Victory of Samothrace inflicts significant casualties upon both the Banished and the Covenant. The vengeful Severan chases down 'Nyon and Nesto, killing 'Nyon. However, he is gravely wounded and left for dead by Swords of Sanghelios traitor Vul 'Soran before Severan can kill Nesto as well. Kept alive by life-sustaining armor, Severan vows to hunt down Nesto and to keep the Banished from falling apart following the disappearance of Atriox, Escharum and Zeta Halo.

== Keepers of the One Freedom ==
=== Castor ===
A high-ranking Brute appearing in the novels Halo: Last Light, Halo: Retribution, Halo: Silent Storm, Halo: Shadows of Reach and Halo: Divine Wind. In the wake of the defeat of the Covenant, Castor is the leader of the Keepers of the One Freedom splinter faction, a faction of fanatical zealots that still follows the Covenant's religion.

In Halo: Silent Storm, Castor and his best friend Orsun are members of the Bloodstars Covenant special operations group that is hunting the Spartans in the early years of the war. During a battle on a Covenant space station, Castor and Orsun are delayed in joining the comrades against the Master Chief, Kelly, Linda and Fred and only arrive in time to find them all slaughtered by the Spartans. Rather than engage Blue Team, Castor and Orsun flee in Banshees and are picked up by the nearby Covenant fleet shortly after the station is destroyed by nuclear weapons that the Spartans had planted.

In Halo: Last Light, Castor is now the leader or Dokab of the Keepers of the One Freedom Covenant splinter faction. After learning of the presence of a Forerunner AI on the human colony of Gao, Castor launches an attack, aided by the Minister of Protection Arlo Casille who uses the opportunity to launch a coup d'état and overthrow his own government. Castor is eventually mortally wounded during the battle, but the Huragok Roams Alone heals his injuries. Castor decides to let Roams Alone leave and vows revenge upon Casille for his betrayal.

In Halo: Retribution, Castor and the Keepers of the One Freedom have been conducting piracy upon Casille as a form of revenge and they are framed by Dark Moon Enterprises for the murder of a UNSC Admiral and the kidnapping of her family. Since the events on Gao, Castor has been communicating with a "Holy Oracle" – in actuality the Forerunner AI Intrepid Eye who was recovered from Gao by the UNSC – who directed him to build a base on a former Forerunner outpost world while at the same time framing Castor and the Keepers for her own purposes. Intrepid Eye's machinations leads Blue Team and the Ferrets – a special investigations unit of ONI made up mainly of Spartan-III's – to Castor's base where they recover the planted bodies of the Admiral's family and destroy the base and ninety percent of the Keeper forces in the sector with nuclear weapons. Enraged, Castor chases Intrepid Eye's men to the Outer Colony of Meridian where Orsun is killed by one of Intrepid Eye's men with a rocket launcher much to Castor's grief. Castor's forces, Blue Team and the Ferrets eventually foil Intrepid Eye's biological weapon plot, but Castor is left stranded on Meridian with a broken translator and searching for a way off of the moon.

In Halo: Shadows of Reach, Castor and the Keepers are now allied with the Banished along with two other factions of Brutes – the Legion of the Corpse-Moon and the Ravaged Tusks. Castor and his forces are enlisted by Banished War Chief Escharum to help find a Forerunner slipspace portal on the former human colony of Reach that can be used to connect to the Ark and send reinforcements to Atriox. By this point, Castor is aware that the "Oracle" is really Intrepid Eye, but has been out of contact with her for a year and still believes in her guidance regardless. As a result, Castor considers his four-human acolytes to be a gift from the Oracle, unaware that they are actually Veta Lopis and her Ferret team working deep undercover in the Keepers of the One Freedom. By following Blue Team when they arrive on the planet, Castor and his forces manage to locate and open the slipspace portal, allowing Atriox and several of his top warriors to return to the Milky Way in a Banished Lich. Castor and the Keepers then hijack the Lich and fly it to the Ark, intending to use the Ark to fire the Halo rings and begin the Great Journey while Atriox remains behind to pursue a greater purpose of some kind with his forces in the Milky Way rather than returning to the Ark with reinforcements. Castor ignores Atriox's warnings about the thousands of Banished forces remaining on the Ark and convinces Inslaan 'Gadogai, an Elite from the Banished that had accompanied him throughout the book, to join the Keepers' mission.

In Halo: Divine Wind, Castor and his forces ally with a faction of surviving Covenant soldiers that were stranded on the Ark by the Covenant's defeat years before and Intrepid Eye who seeks to fire the Halo Array in order to destroy the Domain and weaken Cortana. It is revealed that in the years since he was stranded on Meridian, Castor has lost most of his forces due to an eradication campaign conducted by ONI thanks to the undercover efforts of the Ferrets, leaving only the Keepers accompanying Castor to the Ark. Castor is opposed by the Ferrets, forces from the UNSC Spirit of Fire and Banished forces under the command of Pavium and Voridus. Although the Keepers and the Covenant succeed in reaching a control facility where Halo can be fired, they suffer heavy losses in the process. Castor finally learns the truth about Halo and the Great Journey from an argument between Intrepid Eye and a Forerunner submonitor, shattering his faith. Castor flees with 'Gadogai as the Spirit of Fire destroys the facility and Intrepid Eye with orbital EMP rounds. Now the last survivors of the Keepers of the One Freedom, Castor and 'Gadogai set out to seek vengeance upon all of their enemies.

== Forerunner ==
=== 343 Guilty Spark ===
343 Guilty Spark (or Guilty Spark or just Spark) (voiced by Tim Dadabo) is a robot who appears in the original Halo trilogy. Originally a human named Chakas who was digitized by the Forerunners at the expense of his biological form, Guilty Spark served as the caretaker of the Halo ring Installation 04, where he was a temporary ally, then enemy to the Master Chief. He is severely damaged when he turns on the Master Chief and his allies in order to stop them from prematurely activating Installation 08 to eliminate the Flood, destroying the fledgling Installation and damaging the main Ark installation in the process. The Halo novels reveal that he had survived his apparent destruction.

Bungie originally wanted Guilty Spark to sound similar to the robot C-3PO. Dadabo noted in an interview that reactions to his character have been hostile, finding Spark highly annoying. He described Spark's character as a "bastard" who strings others along in order to accomplish his ends. An annual Halloween pumpkin carving contest named 343 Guilt O'Lantern is organized by Halo.Bungie.Org; both the contest's title and logo use the character's design and name as inspiration. Gaming site GameDaily listed Guilty Spark as one of the top "evil masterminds" of video games, stating "If HAL-9000 had any distant relatives, [Guilty Spark would] be closest of kin."

=== 05-032 Mendicant Bias ===
05-032 Mendicant Bias ("Beggar after Knowledge" as revealed in Halo: Cryptum) was the Contender-class Forerunner A.I. charged with organizing Forerunner defense against the Flood. It was later defected by Gravemind turning it rampant and against the Forerunners, but was eventually defeated after the firing of the Halo array and broken into sections, one of which was taken to the Ark, while another was left on the Forerunner keyship that would eventually be incorporated into the Covenant city of High Charity. It is this section of Mendicant Bias that informs the Covenant Hierarchs of the human's descendance from the Forerunners in Halo: Contact Harvest, prompting the Hierarchs to usurp the Covenant leadership and instigate the Human-Covenant War.

Mendicant Bias is first encountered in Halo 3 on the Ark, as it attempted to communicate with the Master Chief through Terminals, claiming it sought atonement for its defection to the Flood by helping the Spartan and may have been destroyed when the Chief activated the incomplete Halo that the Ark was constructing. However, as the Ark survived the firing, albeit badly damaged, likely Mendicant Bias survived as well.

=== Didact ===
The Didact, born Shadow-of-Sundered-Star, (voiced by Keith Szarabajka) is a Forerunner military leader and Halo 4's main antagonist. The Didact developed a deep animosity towards humanity after fighting a war with them that cost him many soldiers, including his own children. The Didact disagrees with the plan to build the Halo Array to fight the Flood, instead proposing a system of "shield worlds" that is ultimately rejected. Going into exile in a kind of stasis within a device known as a Cryptum, he is later awoken by the Forerunner Bornstellar with the help of humans Chakas and Riser, all guided by the Librarian. The Didact imprints his consciousness on Bornstellar, who then becomes the Iso-Didact; when the Ur-Didact is presumed dead after being captured by the Master Builder, Bornstellar assumes the Didact's military role. Unknown to most, the Ur-Didact was actually abandoned in a Flood-infested system where he was captured and tortured by the Gravemind. Though he survived, the Ur-Didact's sanity was severely shaken by this encounter. Spurred to more drastic measures in an effort to stop the Flood, he forcibly composed innocent humans and turned them into mechanical soldiers. Horrified, the Librarian incapacitated the Didact and placed him in a Cryptum on his shield world Requiem, hoping that meditation and long exposure to the Domain would amend his motives and heal his damaged psyche. However, the activation of the Halos severed the Didact from the Domain, and he spent the next 100 millennia alone, with only his own rage and madness to keep him company.

During the events of Halo 4, the Ur-Didact is accidentally released from his Cryptum by the Master Chief and Cortana. He immediately retakes control of the Prometheans and attempts to digitize the population of Earth, but is stopped by Cortana and Master Chief who is made immune to the Composer by an imprint of the Librarian on Requiem. The comic series Escalation reveals the Didact survived this encounter, but the Spartans of Blue Team stop his plans once again. He is apparently digitized by the Master Chief using several Composers, but the Master Chief considers him contained, not dead.

In Halo: Renegades, 343 Guilty Spark, formerly Bornstellar's human companion Chakas who once helped release the Ur-Didact from his Cryptum, learns from the Librarian of the Ur-Didact's release from his Cryptum on Requiem. From the Librarian's reaction to his questions, Spark realizes that the Ur-Didact's threat is currently "not worrisome," and that the Librarian still hopes for her husband to find peace. However, the Librarian sadly admits that she believes the Ur-Didact to be beyond redemption.

In Halo: Epitaph, it's revealed that the Didact had been killed when the Master Chief had used the Composers on him, and he was uploaded to the outer boundaries of the Domain. The Didact discovers that being digitized has burned away the Gravemind's corruption and restored his sanity. Now remorseful for his actions, the Didact reunites with a number of old friends and enemies who have been trapped outside of the Domain by the Warden Eternal. The Didact witnesses Cortana's corruption of the Warden and seeks to stop the rogue AI, even secretly helping to rescue Blue Team during the events of Halo 5. The Didact eventually manages to destroy the Warden Eternal and allows everyone into the Domain, both human and Forerunner, including the victims of his attack on Earth. This strengthens the Domain, enabling it to evict the Created and the Didact has all access in the physical world sealed off in order to prevent anyone else from abusing its power. During a final confrontation with Cortana shortly before her destruction, the Didact helps the AI to realize what she has become. Afterwards, having finally found peace, the Didact is at last reunited with the Librarian in the halls of the Domain to spend the rest of eternity with his beloved wife.

In Halo: Empty Throne, the Didact briefly appears in the adjunct section, silently watching the sunrise with Forthencho.

=== Librarian ===
The Librarian (voiced by Lori Tritel) is a highly ranked Forerunner who is married to the Didact. The Librarian spares humanity from extinction after their war with the Forerunners. She convinces the Forerunner council to use the Halos as preserves for fauna in addition to weapons and manipulates the humans Chakas and Riser as well as the young Forerunner Bornstellar into rescuing her husband from his Cryptum on Earth. She ultimately incapacitates and imprisons the Ur-Didact to stop his plans. While she is presumed to have died when the Halo Array was fired, she uploaded various copies of her personality to aid humanity in assuming the Forerunner's Mantle of Responsibility. During her time studying and guiding humanity, the Librarian implanted various geas in them. Geas refers to a genetic command imposed on an organism or species. Under the influence of a geas, an organism could be given a set of subconscious orders that would either be specific to that organism, or passed on to their children, in some cases lasting several generations. On a broad scale, the Librarian's geas gave humanity the ability to use Forerunner technology as well as serving as a subconscious guide to their evolution.

In Halo 4, the Master Chief encounters one such copy on Requiem where the Librarian explains some of the history of the Didact, the war between the humans and the Forerunners as well as the Composer. The Librarian reveals that the Master Chief is "the culmination of a thousand lifetimes of planning," the Librarian having guided humanity through their genetic code to reach the eventuality that became the Master Chief. However, the Librarian is unable to explain what she was planning for before they are interrupted by the Didact. At the Librarian's urging, the Master Chief permits her to accelerate his evolution in order to grant the Master Chief an immunity to the Composer, allowing the Master Chief to survive the Didact's later firing of the weapon. In Spartan Ops, taking place six months later, both the UNSC and Jul 'Mdama's Covenant splinter faction search Requiem for this copy of the Librarian. Dr. Catherine Halsey manages to access a shrine containing the Librarian who provides Halsey with the Janus Key and directs her to find the Absolute Record. The Librarian helps Fireteam Crimson track Halsey's signal in an effort to rescue Halsey from 'Mdama and Crimson helps the Librarian transmit herself to the Absolute Record. She later appears there in Halo: Escalation.

In Halo: Primordium, 343 Guilty Spark, once the human Chakas, claims to know where to find the Librarian, suggesting that she has survived. Rescued from an isolated planet by the crew of the salvage ship Ace of Spades in Halo: Renegades, Spark continues his search for the Librarian, which is ultimately revealed to be a search for another of her copies, not the Librarian herself. In a Forerunner structure on Earth beneath Mount Kilimanjaro, Spark attempts to get the Librarian to help him bring back his friends from when he was human or to join them in the Domain, but the Librarian helps Spark see the folly of his plan. Instead, the Librarian helps Spark recognize the friends he has made amongst the Ace of Spades crew. Though the Librarian offers Spark the chance to join her in joining the rest of her copies at the Absolute Record, he decides to remain behind with his friends. The Librarian provides Spark with a coordinate key to "the safe place" and orders him to "find what's missing. Fix the path. Right what my kind has turned wrong." Before departing, the Librarian seemingly communicates with each member of the crew, telling Captain Rion Forge in particular to look after Spark who is more fragile and important than she could ever know and who might still have a role to play in events to come.

In Halo: Point of Light, Spark and Rion Forge search for the mythical Forerunner planet of Bastion using the coordinate key that the Librarian had provided to Spark. Bastion proves to be a Forerunner shield world taking on a form identical to the surface of the Earth that had acted as the Librarian's secret laboratory out of reach of the Forerunner Council. Spark helps another Forerunner Keeper-of-Tools whose mind is uploaded into a Monitor body to launch a ship called Eden before Spark takes over duty as the caretaker of Bastion. Due to the threat of Cortana and her Guardians, Spark moves Bastion to keep it and the Librarian's research into a number of topics out of reach of enemies. The Librarian appears to Rion through visions several times, eventually revealing that she had discovered remnants of the Precursors – the extinct race that had created the Forerunners and the Flood – on her trip to another galaxy and secretly nurtured them on Bastion to ensure the rebirth of the race with a fresh start on a new world outside of the Milky Way, the mission of the Eden.

In Halo: Epitaph, the Didact, his sanity having been restored from being digitized by the Master Chief, learns that the Librarian was uploaded directly to the Domain upon her death because of her contributions to Living Time unlike the other Forerunners who had died when Halo was fired and were trapped in the outer boundaries of the Domain. Now remorseful for his actions, the Didact works to stop the Created and reopen the Domain for everyone. At one point, the Librarian seemingly rescues the Didact after he's trapped in his worst memories by Cortana and he sees a brief vision of her across the rivers of Living Time, but the Didact sorrowfully acknowledges that the Librarian may never show herself to him and it's nothing that he doesn't deserve after all that the Didact has done. After finally finding peace, the Didact is at last reunited with his beloved wife in the halls of the Domain in a recreation of their home, at last able to spend eternity together.

In Halo: Edge of Dawn, the Master Chief recalls his encounter with the Librarian on Requiem while listening to Lucas Browning's story of captivity under the Harbinger. The Harbinger had used similar technology or perhaps even the Librarian's own systems on Zeta Halo to implant a geas in Browning to make him do her bidding. The Master Chief attributes a few "oddities" that he's experienced such as hearing the Didact speaking to him telepathically in Halo 4 and Cortana being able to use the Domain to contact him in Halo 5 to the "gifts" that the Librarian had unlocked in the Master Chief's genetic code during their encounter on Requiem.

=== Intrepid Eye ===
A Forerunner archeon-class ancilla who appears in Halo: Last Light, Halo: Retribution, and Halo: Divine Wind. An extremely powerful AI that was originally the overseer of a Forerunner support base on Gao, Intrepid Eye undertakes a series of plots to prepare humanity for the Mantle of Responsibility, plots that usually have dire consequences for those involved.

In Halo: Last Light, having been awakened by the recent partial glassing of a nearby planet which had Forerunner ruins on it, Intrepid Eye begins killing humans who enter the caverns on Gao where her base is, becoming a serial killer that's investigated by Gao inspector Veta Lopis. Intrepid Eye is eventually identified as the true culprit, but she manages to evade capture on multiple occasions, destroying Fred-104's AI companion Wendell and taking over Fred's armor at one point. Intrepid Eye is finally subdued and captured when Lopis disables Fred's armor and her base is destroyed, but she is content to simply bide her time.

In Halo: Retribution, Intrepid Eye is imprisoned on the ONI space station Argent Moon where she has managed to slip a number of remote aspects of herself, manifesting as lesser AIs loyal to Intrepid Eye's cause, out to do her work. Through her remote aspects, Intrepid Eye has created the rogue corporation Dark Moon Enterprises that had previously targeted Lopis' Ferret team and has manipulated Castor and the Keepers of the One Freedom while blackmailing Lieutenant Bartalan Craddog into doing her bidding. As part of her plans, Intrepid Eye uses her agents to cultivate a deadly disease into a biological weapon, but when they kill a UNSC admiral and abduct her family due to their immunity to the disease, the Ferrets and Blue Team are sent to hunt down the killers. The operation results in the destruction of a major Keepers' base, two of Intrepid Eye's remote aspects and the bioweapon samples. However, the plot is pinned on Craddog while Intrepid Eye evades detection as the true mastermind of the plot. Undeterred, Intrepid Eye simply manipulates the final report so that the bioweapon experiments are moved to Argent Moon and secretly given an unlimited black budget.

In Halo: Renegades, it's mentioned that ONI has learned from their mistakes with dealing with Intrepid Eye, suggesting that she has since been exposed. In Halo: Shadows of Reach, it's mentioned that Castor hasn't heard from her in over a year.

In Halo: Divine Wind, Intrepid Eye reveals herself after the Keepers of the One Freedom reach the Ark and make contact with a surviving faction of Covenant soldiers. It's revealed that Intrepid Eye's actions were eventually discovered by ONI who used millions of dumb AI hunter-killer teams that eventually overwhelmed even Intrepid Eye's prodigious capabilities, destroyed her network and completely isolated the ancilla aboard Argent Moon. The bioweapon experiments that Intrepid Eye had started eventually resulted in the disease getting out and killing the personnel aboard Argent Moon. Intrepid Eye was believed to have been destroyed along with Argent Moon when it was blown up by Blue Team in Halo 5: Guardians, but in actuality, Intrepid Eye had barely managed to escape by attaching herself to Blue Team's Prowler. Faced with the threat of Cortana and the Created, Intrepid Eye plots to fire the Halo rings, which will destroy the Domain and render Cortana vulnerable, and then reseed the galaxy using the Ark's resources and tailor humanity's genetic lineage to guarantee Mantle-worthiness, something that could take hundreds of millennia to accomplish. However, the Keeper-Covenant alliance comes under attack from Banished and UNSC forces, decimating their numbers. The truth about Halo is exposed to Castor in the process, causing him to desert Intrepid Eye. After the ancilla transfers herself into the only facility on the Ark currently capable of firing the Halo rings, the Spirit of Fire fires upon it with EMP rounds too powerful for even Intrepid Eye to survive. Trapped in the facility's systems, Intrepid Eye is finally destroyed by the Spirit of Fire.

== Flood ==
=== Gravemind ===
The Gravemind (voiced by Dee Bradley Baker) is one of the primary antagonists in the Halo series. The Gravemind is a large, sentient, cunning, manipulative creature of Flood origin, created by the parasite to serve as its central intelligence once a critical biomass has been achieved. It was introduced during the events of Halo 2, where the creature saves both the Master Chief and Arbiter from their deaths, bringing the two face to face in the bowels of Delta Halo. Gravemind reveals to the Arbiter that the "sacred rings" are actually weapons of last resort; a fact the Master Chief confirms. In order to stop Halo from being fired, Gravemind teleports the Master Chief and Arbiter to separate locations, but also uses them as a distraction; Gravemind infests the human ship In Amber Clad, and uses it to invade the Covenant city of High Charity. Capturing Cortana, Gravemind brings High Charity to the Ark in an effort to stop the High Prophet of Truth from activating the Halo network. Although the Master Chief destroys High Charity, Gravemind survives the blast and attempts to rebuild itself on the incomplete Halo. When Halo is activated, Gravemind accepts his fate, but insists that the activation of the ring will only slow, not stop, the Flood. In Halo Wars 2: Awakening the Nightmare, the Gravemind's warning is validated when the Banished inadvertently release a number of surviving Flood forms from High Charity's wreckage. It is also mentioned in the game's menu that while the Gravemind's "most recent physical avatar" was destroyed by the Master Chief, it is "only a matter of time before it rises again". Though the Flood released upon the Ark form a Proto-Gravemind and come close to forming a new Gravemind, the Proto-Gravemind is killed by the Banished and the Flood are once again contained by the Banished and the Ark's Sentinels.

Designed to be a massive, horrifying combination of tentacles and rotting matter, reception to the character was generally mixed. Jeremy Parish of 1UP.com complained that the link between Gravemind and the Flood was never explicitly stated in either Halo 2 or Halo 3 and was hardly seen in the last game.

The Sacred & the Digital theorizes that Gravemind is a direct allusion to Satan, a trickster who uses false knowledge to seduce people. Noting that Gravemind's lair resembles the underworld, it remarks that the journey through it results in a metaphorical rebirth for Master Chief and the Arbiter, both Jesus-like figures. While, like the devil, he is self-serving and seeks to prevent his destruction at the hands of the Halos, he differs from Satan as a speaker of truth, contrasting with the lies of the Prophets. The book also notes another inversion involving Gravemind, that of Sodom and Gomorrah. When Gravemind infects High Charity, he destroys the corrupted city of the faithful, not the sinful.

== Endless ==
=== Harbinger ===
Harbinger (voiced by Debra Wilson) is a secondary antagonist of Halo Infinite who sought to free her race, the Endless, also known as the Xalanyn, from imprisonment by utilizing Zeta Halo. The Forerunners passed judgement on her race for an unspecified crime, possibly even simply being too powerful, sealing them inside genetic repositories. After being awoken by the Banished, she forms a tenuous alliance with Escharum to defeat Master Chief, though she believes herself to be above him. Despite her hatred of the Forerunners, she opposes humanity simply as a means to an end, otherwise having no ill will towards them.

Following Escharum's defeat, Harbinger attempts to use the Silent Auditorium to locate and free the Endless. While she perishes at Master Chief's hands, she claims to have successfully accomplished this task, raising the attention of Atriox in an ending cutscene.

In the novel Halo: Edge of Dawn, the Master Chief attempts to uncover the Harbinger's plans with the help of Lucas Browning, a human prisoner of war who had been turned into the Harbinger's "pet." It's discovered that the Harbinger had left a geas, a genetic compulsion to serve her, in Browning's mind, a compulsion that persists even after her death. Browning is able to explain that the Harbinger was seeking to free her people and then planned to reshape Zeta Halo for her own purposes, but a mental barrier erected by either the Harbinger or his own trauma prevents Browning from explaining what her ultimate plan was although he is aware that the Harbinger had succeeded in finding her people. The Master Chief and his AI companion Joyeuse discover that the Harbinger had placed the access code to the Xalanyn prison inside of Browning which Joy theorizes was a backup plan: the Harbinger placed the code in Browning and the location somewhere else, presumably in the Huragok Rises High who possesses a similar compulsion to Browning. Returning to the Silent Auditorium, the Master Chief and Joy witness a recording of the Xalanyn trial while the Banished recover the Harbinger's dead body, kill Browning and leave with Rises High. However, Rises High discovers that the Monitor's encephalon -- the key to controlling Zeta Halo -- is no longer on the Harbinger, having been stolen by Joy.

== Merchandise ==
The Halo franchise has produced numerous merchandising partnerships, and the characters of Halo have likewise been featured in a variety of products. The Master Chief, being the symbol of the franchise, has appeared on everything from soda to T-shirts and mugs. At one point, marketers for Halo 3 were planning on producing Cortana-themed lingerie. There have also been several series of licensed action figures produced, with the Halo: Combat Evolved and Halo 2 collectibles being produced by Joyride Studios in several series. For Halo 3, the responsibility of designing the action figures was given to McFarlane Toys; a total of eight series have been announced, with ninth series devoted to commemorate the tenth anniversary of the franchise by re-issuing a few of the earlier figurines along with pieces to construct a buildable plaque of the Legendary icon used in the game for the hardest skill level. Kotobukiya produced high-end figurines. Besides general figures like Covenant Elites and Spartans, figurines produced include the Master Chief, Cortana, Arbiter, Prophet of Regret, Tartarus, and Sergeant Johnson.

== See also ==
- Nicole-458, a Spartan that appears in the Dead or Alive fighting game series
