= Eric Nylund =

American writer

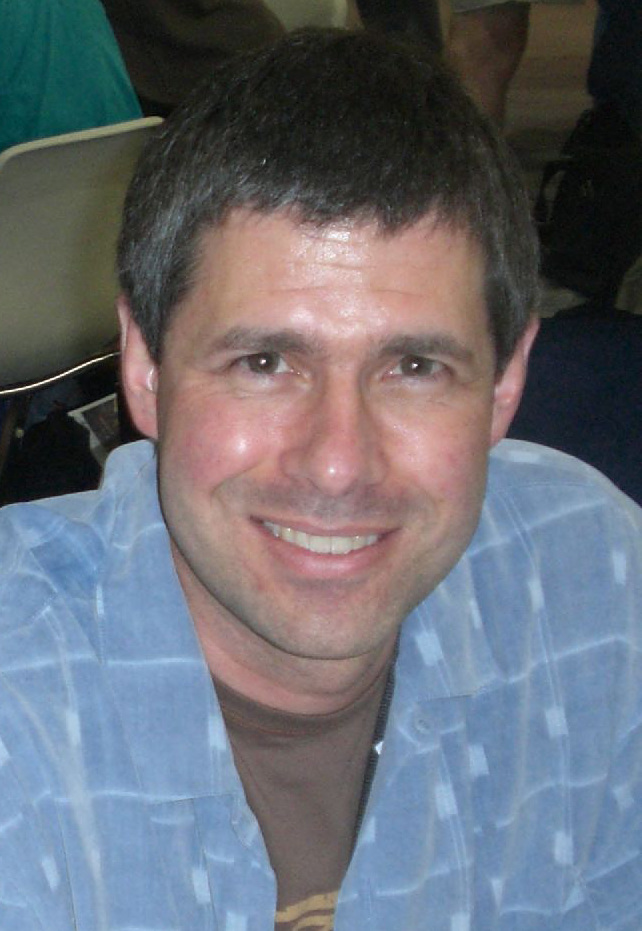
- Nylund in 2007
- Born: Eric S. Nylund; November 12, 1964 (age 61); Panorama City, California, U.S.
- Education: University of California, Santa Barbara (BS); University of California, San Diego
- Occupation: Novelist
- Spouse: Syne Mitchell
- Writing career
- Genre: Science fiction
- Website: ericnylund.com at the Wayback Machine (archived 2023-12-23)

Eric S. Nylund (born November 12, 1964) is an American novelist and professional technical writer. His wife, Syne Mitchell, is also a science fiction writer. He holds a Bachelor of Science in chemistry from the University of California, Santa Barbara and a Master's degree in chemical physics from the University of California, San Diego. He lives in North Bend, Washington with his wife, Syne, and son, Kai Nylund.

Nylund is the author of three novels set in the Halo universe: Halo: The Fall of Reach, Halo: First Strike, and Halo: Ghosts of Onyx, as well as a short story in Halo: Evolutions and the graphic novel Halo Wars: Genesis. He is employed as a writer for Microsoft Game Studios. His duties include the development of story bibles and other such fictional assets, the preparation of materials for marketing, and coordination with Microsoft localization, legal, and geopolitical departments.

In the 1990s he was hired by Microsoft to help rewrite and edit portions of Microsoft's multi-media encyclopedia. Since then, he has written several novels based on Microsoft-published games, including the aforementioned Halo novels, and Crimson Skies, which was written collaboratively with Eric S. Trautmann.

Nylund has written many original novels as well, including Signal to Noise, A Signal Shattered and Dry Water.

He has finished All That Lives Must Die, the sequel to Mortal Coils. Mortal Coils and All That Lives Must Die are books 1 and 2 in a proposed 5-book series. Publisher Tor Books has yet to officially purchase the next novel What Fools These Mortals, which was currently being written by Nylund. As of August 2015, Nylund revealed that Tor Books declined to purchase the rest of the series or to revert publishing rights for the first two books. As he has stated he would prefer to republish the initial books of the series before pursuing alternative publishing options such as crowdfunding, the series is functionally defunct.

== Bibliography ==
=== Novels ===
- Pawn's Dream (1995)
- A Game of Universe (1997)
- Dry Water (1997)
- What Fools These Mortals
- Crimson Skies (2002)

==== Signal ====
- Signal to Noise (1998)
- A Signal Shattered (1999)

==== Halo ====
- Halo: The Fall of Reach (2001)
- Halo: First Strike (2003)
- Halo: Ghosts of Onyx (2006)
- Halo: Evolutions (2009)

==== Mortal Coils ====
- Mortal Coils (2009)
- All That Lives Must Die (2010)

==== The Resisters ====
- The Resisters (2011)
- Sterling Squadron (2012)
- Titan Base (2013)
- Operation Inferno (2013)

==== Hero of Thera Series ====
- Hero of Thera (2017)
- A Thousand Drunken Monkeys (2019)

=== Graphic novels ===
- Halo Wars: Genesis (2009)
- Battlestar Galactica: Cylon War (2009)
