= Bonnie Ross =

American video game developer

- Born: 1966 or 1967 (age 59–60)
- Other name: Bonnie Ross Ziegler
- Education: Colorado State University
- Occupation: Game developer
- Years active: 1994–present
- Known for: Video game development
- Notable work: Halo 4; Halo: The Master Chief Collection

Bonnie Ross is an American video game developer. She served as Corporate Vice President at Xbox Game Studios, and was the head of 343 Industries, the subsidiary studio that manages the Halo video game franchise. Ross studied technical writing and computer science in college, and worked at IBM before getting a job at Microsoft. She worked on a number of PC and Xbox games, becoming a general manager at Xbox Game Studios.

In 2007, Ross helped found 343 Industries, building a studio that would work on a new Halo game after the departure of developer Bungie. 343 Industries' first game, Halo 4, released in 2012. Ross oversaw the Halo franchise, including merchandise and media adaptations. She has been honored for her work in game development and her efforts to push for more diversity in video games.

== Early life ==
Growing up, Ross enjoyed science fiction, imagining what it would be like to create similar worlds herself. She played basketball, softball, tennis, and volleyball. Her first video game was a 1970s Mattel handheld basketball game. Ross credited her athletic background with introducing her to gaming, as well as teaching her to learn from setbacks and failure. Encouraged by her parents to pursue a more practical career than sports, Ross studied technology.

Ross attended Colorado State University, initially majoring in engineering; she was one of the only women in her program. Desiring more creative freedom, Ross switched to a technical writing program in the journalism department during her 1987–88 school year. She interned at IBM for two years, and coached high school sports and wrote technical manuals in her spare time. Ross graduated in 1989, with a degree in Technical Communication and a concentration in Physics and Computer Science.

== Career ==
After graduation, Ross applied to NeXT, Apple, and Microsoft; NeXT and Apple did not respond to Ross' resume, while Microsoft did. At Microsoft, she tired of the dry, technical writing her job required. Initially looking at taking a break from Microsoft for a year to work on something creative, she secured a position as a producer on a basketball game on the basis of her sports and technology background. The game, Microsoft Full Court Press, released in 1996. Ross described her early career as working on co-development and publishing projects. She worked on games such as Zoo Tycoon, Fuzion Frenzy, Jade Empire, Mass Effect, Psychonauts, Gears of War, Alan Wake, and Crackdown in roles such as lead or executive producer, and studio head. She credited the variety of games as encouraging her to stay at Microsoft rather than moving to another company.

=== 343 Industries ===
By 2005, Ross was a general manager for Microsoft Game Studios (now Xbox Game Studios). When Halo developer Bungie split from Microsoft in 2007, Microsoft created a new internal team to oversee the franchise. Ross recalled that her colleagues felt Halo was a waning property and looked at contracting an outside company to produce new games, but she argued differently. Ross had first become acquainted with the franchise through the tie-in novel Halo: The Fall of Reach. The deep backstory and universe in the novel appealed to her. Ross' pitch won over Microsoft Game Studios general manager Shane Kim, and she was put in charge of the new studio, 343 Industries.

Beginning in late 2007, 343 Industries started with a staff of roughly a dozen people. Bungie staffer Frank O'Connor assisted in the transition, and expected Ross would be an executive with no knowledge of Halo or its appeal. Instead, Ross impressed O'Connor with her deep knowledge of the franchise, and O'Connor quit Bungie to join 343 Industries as franchise director. Ross' vision for Halo also impressed art director Kiki Wolfkill, who joined the team as a studio head. During the transition, Ross worked with the company Starlight Runner to interview Bungie staff and compile a centralized story bible for the universe. 343 Industries also worked with Bungie on their last Halo projects, Halo 3: ODST (2009) and Reach (2010). 343 Industries has also collaborated with other studios to produce Halo games, such as Halo: Combat Evolved Anniversary, Halo: Spartan Assault, and Halo Wars 2.

343 Industries would ultimately hire from more than 55 different companies to work on their first major game, Halo 4. Midway through development, 343 changed the vision of the project significantly, leading to the departure of the game's creative director and Josh Holmes as a replacement. The developers created a vertical slice of gameplay that was very similar to a Bungie-style Halo game, and then used that to inform a different direction for the game. Halo 4 released in 2012 and grossed $220 million in first-day sales.

In 2014, 343 Industries released Halo: The Master Chief Collection, a compilation of the four main Halo games for the Xbox One. On launch, the game suffered from severe issues, and Ross issued public apologies for the state of the product; she later called it the worst moment in her career. Ross later promised future 343 Industries games would have betas to avoid similar problems. Halo 5: Guardians released in 2015, and sales of the games and related merchandise topped $400 million in its first week. Lessons learned from the development of Halo 5 led to a longer development period for the next game, Halo Infinite, released in 2021.

Ross also envisioned the Halo franchise growing with transmedia content such as books and television. Halo 4's release coincided with a tie-in episodic series, Halo 4: Forward Unto Dawn. Ross would later announce a live-action Halo television series at the Xbox One reveal in 2013.

Ross announced her departure from 343 Industries on September 12, 2022. She became a board member at Duolingo in December 2024.

== Diversity efforts ==
Noticing how few women attended gaming events like E3, Ross helped found a networking group that evolved into the Microsoft Women in Gaming community and a yearly event. She believes gaming can serve as a way to get young people interested in STEM careers by relating it to something they enjoy. Ross has worked to hire more female game developers so more women can find role models within the industry, and worked with the Ad Council's #SheCanSTEM campaign. Head of Xbox Phil Spencer said Ross' profile helped attract female talent to the company. Ross told 60 Minutes she believes more diverse teams result in more innovation and creative output.

Ross argues that game developers have a "personal responsibility" to avoid gendered stereotyping in their games, as well as taking action against sexist abuse. She recalled that for every character in Halo 4, "we were very deliberate in thinking about who should be female and who should be male in the game, and if we came off stereotypical, we went back to question what we were doing and why." Ross has also focused on introducing more racial and gender diversity to the video games.

== Recognition ==
Ross appeared as a speaker at the Grace Hopper Celebration of Women in Computing, held in Phoenix, Arizona, presenting on "Technology and How It Is Evolving Storytelling in Our Entertainment Experiences". She has also made appearances as a speaker at GeekWire 2013 and Microsoft's ThinkNext 2015 in Israel. Ross was also the lead speaker for Microsoft's presentation at the 2015 Electronic Entertainment Expo, as part of an industry push for larger roles for women.

In 2014, Fortune listed Ross as one of "10 powerful women in video games", which noted that she was "responsible for defining the vision and leading the Halo franchise". The Academy of Interactive Arts and Sciences named Ross as their 2019 Inductee to their Hall of Fame at the 22nd Annual D.I.C.E. Awards held in February 2019. She was the second female inductee in this award since its establishment.
