= Halo: Spartan Strike =

2015 video game

- Developers: 343 Industries; Vanguard Games
- Publisher: Microsoft Studios
- Composer: Tom Salta
- Series: Halo
- Platforms: Microsoft Windows, Windows Phone, iOS
- Release: April 16, 2015
- Genre: Twin-stick shooter
- Mode: Single-player

Halo: Spartan Strike is a twin-stick shooter video game set in the military science fiction Halo universe. The successor to Halo: Spartan Assault, the game was developed by 343 Industries and Vanguard Games. It was released for iOS, Windows, and Windows Phone on April 16, 2015. During gameplay, players assume the role of human supersoldiers known as Spartans in a series of war games simulating historical events. Players use new weapons, armor abilities, and vehicles in a campaign mode of 30 missions.

The developers incorporated feedback from Spartan Assault to improve Spartan Strike, improving the controls and mission variety. Originally slated for a late 2014 release, the technical problems with Halo: The Master Chief Collection pushed the release into 2015. Spartan Strike received mixed reviews on release. The game was generally considered an improvement over its predecessor, although its lack of multiplayer features was criticized.

== Gameplay ==
The player driving a Warthog while fighting enemies

Halo: Spartan Strike is a twin-stick shooter game that utilizes a top-down perspective. Players control a human soldier and fight against enemy aliens with a variety of weapons, abilities, and vehicles. Gameplay is similar to Spartan Assault, Spartan Strike's antecedent. The controls received slight updates. New to the game are the Promethean enemies and their weapons, which join human and Covenant arsenals, as well as new pivotable vehicles. Players can customize their starting weapon loadouts before starting a mission, as well as choosing to add "skulls", difficulty modifiers that increase player scores. Weapons and powerups are purchased with XP; players gain more XP by completing mission challenges and increasing the difficulty. The campaign is made up of twenty short stages, with additional stages unlocked by obtaining high enough scores. Objectives revolve around clearing areas, surviving enemy waves, protecting objectives, or reaching end points of a level. Unlike Spartan Assault, the game features no microtransactions.

== Plot ==
Halo: Spartan Strike takes place during two eras: the first part during the events of Halo 2, and the second part after the events of Halo 4. The player character is a Spartan IV supersoldier that leads UNSC forces against the Covenant within a combat simulation. During the Covenant invasion of the Earth city of New Mombasa, they sought an artifact known as the Conduit. While a group of human soldiers were able to secure the Conduit, they were presumed lost after the city was devastated by a slipspace rupture. Five years later, the UNSC receives a signal from the Conduit on the Forerunner ringworld Gamma Halo, where they fight against a new Covenant faction also seeking the artifact. They learn that the Conduit can open Forerunner portals across the galaxy, and transported itself away from New Mombasa to avoid destruction. This new Covenant faction intends to use the Conduit to bring Promethean reinforcements to Gamma Halo and wrest control of the ring. Though the Conduit is recovered, the faction open portals to the human city of New Phoenix. The UNSC brings the Conduit to the base to shut down the portals, stemming the invasion, but the Conduit slips away again. The player is tasked with joining a team to hunt down the Conduit.

== Development ==
To produce the Halo franchise's first mobile game, 343 Industries partnered with Vanguard Games to develop Halo: Spartan Assault. Vanguard was chosen due to prior experience developing twin-stick shooters. Spartan Assault released in 2013 to mixed reviews. Vanguard Games and 343 Industries announced a sequel, Spartan Strike, in October 2014. In crafting the sequel, the developers focused on areas that had received negative feedback in Spartan Assault, such as improving the controls, especially on touchscreen devices. 343 Industries producer Fred LaPorte described their aim as making Spartan Strike "the premium mobile device experience". Tom Salta returned to score the music for Spartan Strike. He started by capturing the sound effects from Spartan Assault to write music against, making sure the orchestral sounds would mesh with the rest of the soundscape.

Technical problems with Halo: The Master Chief Collection resulted in Spartan Strike's release date being pushed back from December 12. The game was released as a digital download for Windows devices and Steam on April 16, 2015. Spartan Strike and Spartan Assault also arrived on iOS, available for purchase a la carte or in a bundle.

== Reception ==
Reception

Aggregate score
Aggregator	Score
Metacritic	iOS: 86/100; PC: 66/100

Review scores
Publication	Score
GameSpot	70/100
IGN	72/100
TouchArcade	4.5/5

Halo: Spartan Strike received mixed reviews from critics, with an aggregate score of 66/100 for the PC version on Metacritic. The game's iOS version received more positive reviews, garnering an aggregate score of 86/100. Critics praised the game's translation of the Halo experience into the top-down view. Critics such as PCMag's Jordan Minor and Pocket Gamer's Harry Slater wrote that the game improved on Spartan Assault in most ways, with IGN's Dave Rudden writing that at times Spartan Strike felt like a more optimized, patched version of Spartan Assault. Miguel Concepcion, writing for GameSpot, called Spartan Strike "the closest we have to a Halo game, had it existed in the late 1980s arcades."

Reviews cited improvements made to Spartan Assault's formula, such as improved mission variety. The controls were also considered tweaked and improved over the game's predecessor. The game's graphics and music were well-received. Minor singled out Tom Salta's score, writing that the music "adds an almost-unearned amount of poignancy to something as simple and silly as blasting hordes of monsters from the back of a space truck". The removal of Spartan Assault's microtransactions was positively noted, although GamesTM felt that the XP requirements in lieu of the micro transactions created an "equally depressing" grind.

The lack of multiplayer was criticized, with Slater calling the omission the game's biggest weakness. Rudden deemed Spartan Strike as lacking Spartan Assault's replay value due to the missing mode. Other complaints included bugs, with Vandal's Juan Rubio reporting getting stuck in vehicles with regularity, and inconsistent frame rate during heavy periods of on-screen action.
