= Halo: Spartan Assault =

2013 video game

- Spartan Assault cover art, featuring the main character Sarah Palmer
- Developers: 343 Industries; Vanguard Games
- Publisher: Microsoft Studios
- Composer: Tom Salta
- Series: Halo
- Platforms: Microsoft Windows; Windows Phone; Xbox One; Xbox 360; iOS
- Release: July 18, 2013: Microsoft Windows, Windows Phone; NA: July 18, 2013; EU: July 19, 2013 Xbox One; WW: December 24, 2013 Xbox 360; WW: January 31, 2014 Steam; WW: April 4, 2014 iOS; WW: April 16, 2015
- Genre: Twin-stick shooter
- Modes: Single-player; Multiplayer

Halo: Spartan Assault is a twin-stick shooter video game developed by 343 Industries and Vanguard Games. Part of the Halo franchise, the game was released on July 18, 2013, for Microsoft's Windows 8 and Windows Phone 8 platforms. The game was subsequently released on Xbox 360, Xbox One, Steam, and iOS. Halo: Spartan Assault is set between the events of Halo 3 and Halo 4. Players control the human soldiers Sarah Palmer and Edward Davis as they fight a new splinter faction of the alien Covenant. The game launched with 25 single-player missions; an additional campaign was released as downloadable content. The console versions also feature an exclusive cooperative horde mode.

After years of rumored or cancelled handheld Halo projects, Spartan Assault was the franchise's first mobile game. The developers spent time adapting Halo's distinctive elements to a touchscreen game meant to be played in short bursts. The game received mixed reviews on release. Reviewers praised the game for its success at replicating Halo's aesthetic; the mobile versions of the game received lower average scores. Spartan Assault was followed by a sequel, Spartan Strike, in 2015.

== Gameplay ==
The player character (center) firing on enemies. Spartan Assault's replication of the Halo franchise look-and-feel was praised by reviewers.

Halo: Spartan Assault is a shooter game where players experience gameplay from an overhead top-down perspective. Players assume the role of human supersoldiers fighting against a splinter faction of the former alien alliance known as the Covenant. The control method for the game depends on the host device. On touchscreen mobile devices, players control the character through virtual joysticks—the left stick controls movement and the right stick controls the direction of the character's fire—along with buttons along the edge of the screen. Xbox 360 and Xbox One players use a physical gamepad, while Windows players can use either a gamepad, or keyboard and mouse. To assist players, many weapons auto-target enemies in the direction the player is firing.

The game's campaign mode is divided into chapters, then further subdivided into individual missions. The game features classic weapons and vehicles from the franchise. Playing Halo: Spartan Assault earns the player experience points and content for use in Halo 4. Completing missions or rotating weekly challenges award credits that can be used to buy boosts or different weapons for each mission. In lieu of spending credits for upgrades, players can use real currency.

The Xbox 360 and the Xbox One versions of the game feature an additional cooperative game mode, designed to be different from that of the main campaign. Two players team up to survive against waves of enemy Flood on five different stages. The game mode features new Spartan abilities and weapons. The Windows Phone and Windows PC version support cross-play, allowing players to start missions on one device and resume on another.

== Plot ==
Halo: Spartan Assault takes place in the 26th century between the events of Halo 3 and Halo 4. Following the events of Halo 3, the human UNSC and alien Elites (Sangheili) signed a ceasefire to end a decades-long war. Gameplay follows through the perspective of the Spartan supersoldiers Sarah Palmer or Spartan Davis. Canonically, the events are played from the perspective of human military cadets, reliving the events inside a battle simulation.

Spartans Palmer and Davis are stationed on the planet Draetheus V when it comes under attack from a splinter group of the Covenant who have ignored the ceasefire. Palmer and Davis work to repel the invaders. This new Covenant faction led by Merg Vol discovers that Draetheus' moon is actually a weapon built by an ancient race known as the Forerunners. Merg Vol's Covenant activates the weapon, tearing apart Draetheus and triggering an evacuation. Spartan Davis gives his life to allow the remaining human forces enough time to escape. Spartan Palmer tracks down Merg Vol, kills him, sabotages the Forerunner weapon, and escapes the moon.

In the Operation Hydra campaign, Spartan Palmer returns to X50 in search of a mysterious signal. She discovers that the signal is actually a distress signal from Spartan Davis. Palmer reaches the core of X50, but finds Davis dead; the moon is using his remains to create an unknown device, which Palmer extracts for study.

== Development ==
Over the years, rumors swirled of a handheld or mobile version of Halo for the Game Boy Advance, Gizmondo, Ultra-Mobile PC, and Nintendo DS. Then-Halo developer Bungie quashed speculation they were developing an Xbox Live Arcade title in 2006. When Halo overseer 343 Industries was interested in developing a mobile game, Franchise Development Director Frank O'Connor recommended an arcade shooter, having wanted for years to see a Halo game in the vein of Moon Patrol. Having come up with the idea for the game, 343 Industries approached Vanguard Games, who had prior twin-stick shooter experience, to develop it. During development, the game was known by the codename Bootcamp.

343 Industries Executive Producer Dan Ayoub described the challenge of adapting Halo for a portable device as crafting the right experience for the device. "If we'd gone down the first-person shooter route, we might have built something compelling, but it couldn't on its own merit play as well as a traditional Halo game," O'Connor recalled. While focusing on optimizing the game for touch controls, the developers wanted to make sure the elements that made Halo distinctive—its weapon sandbox, abilities, and look—remained. The focus on a mobile game experience also meant that the developers broke up the game's missions into smaller chunks for short playthroughs. More than fifteen control variations were tested. The developers designed adaptive controls that move around the screen to match the drift of player's hands on the touchscreen and reduce frustration. For the console release of Spartan Assault, the developers took feedback from reviews to further tune the controls and adjust balance and scoring.

Tom Salta composed Spartan Assault's music. The game was the first time Salta had worked on a project where the sound had been established by another composer—Salta called the original music of Combat Evolved "sacred ground for me" and his inspiration to compose for video games. Previous to Spartan Assault Salta was part of the team that reorchestrated and recorded the music for Halo: Combat Evolved Anniversary. Because the game was designed to be played on mobile devices, Salta and the music team worked to make sure audio quality would be high on small mobile speakers as well as through headphones or higher-end hardware. Since there was a limited budget for the music, Salta chose which sounds and instruments he would record live. Salta starts composing on a keyboard and uses Logic.

== Release ==
Spartan Assault was announced in June 2013 at San Diego Comic-Con. The game was released in North America and Europe on July 18 and 19, respectively. In the United States, the game was initially restricted to Verizon phones before being released to all Windows 8 enabled devices in August. The game's release coincided with a tie-in comic series, Halo: Initiation, which detailed Palmer's path to becoming a Spartan.

An Xbox One version of the game—running at 1080p resolution and 60 frames per second—was released on December 24; the Xbox 360 version was delayed and was released January 31, 2014. Players who already purchased the mobile version received a discount on the console pricing. It was released on Steam on April 4, the first game in the series to be distributed on the platform. It was a free title for Xbox Live subscribers as part of the "Games with Gold" program in June 2014. On April 16, 2015, the game was released for iOS.

Operation Hydra, a free update to the game, was released August 29. The update added new missions and achievements, the ability to buy certain power weapons with XP rather than real currency, and support for the Xbox 360 controller. A demo version of the game, featuring a tutorial and single mission, was released on August 30. The update also added compatibility for Windows Phone hardware with 512MB of RAM, and enabled play using an Xbox gamepad on Windows computers.

== Reception ==
Reception

Aggregate score
Aggregator	Score
Metacritic	PC: 70/100; XONE: 53/100; X360: 51/100

Review scores
Publication	Score
Destructoid	7/10
Eurogamer	7/10
Game Informer	8.25/10
GameSpot	6/10
IGN	6.7/10
Maximum PC	8/10
PC Gamer (US)	58/100
Pocket Gamer	9/10

Spartan Assault received mixed reviews upon release. The PC version has a weighted aggregate rating of 70/100 on Metacritic, with the Xbox 360 and Xbox One versions having lower scores of 51 and 53, respectively. Critics including Harry Slater of Pocket Gamer and Chris Carter of Destructoid wrote that while Spartan Assault was not going to be a Windows 8 killer app, it was a worthwhile purchase for gamers on the Windows 8 platform. Geek.com's Russell Holly wrote that the game was a milestone in mobile gaming, with Microsoft producing a high-quality mobile experience of an established property. Digital Trends considered the mobile version satisfactory, but found the ports underwhelming. More critically, reviews such as those for PC Gamer and X-One considered the game a disappointment.

Reviewers praised the game for its authentic Halo look and feel. Game Informer's Kyle Hilliard called Spartan Assault "a true Halo game, even if the series' signature scope and size are scaled down", with the game featuring familiar Halo moments, enemies, and sounds. Destructoid's Christ Carter praised the game for successfully adapting Halo's gameplay formula of guns, grenades, and melee attacks to the new genre. In comparison, Polygon's Philip Kollar called the appeal "illusory", as Spartan Assault did not contain any of Halo's "subtlety or strategy." IGN's Dan Stapleton considered the Halo trappings the main appeal of the game, as without it, Spartan Assault would be just another competent but unremarkable twin-stick shooter. The console co-op missions were considered a highlight of the game; GameSpot and Polygon's critics noted that the cooperative mode demanded different tactics than the regular campaign.

Reviewers were divided on the controls. VideoGamer's Simon Miller found the on-foot sections excellent but controlling vehicles difficult on PC and even harder on mobile. The Verge's Tom Warren agreed the touch controls were awkward. Stapleton recommended playing the game with a keyboard and mouse if possible, a sentiment echoed by Hillard, who felt the touch controls became more of a liability as the game's difficulty increased. The lack of controller support at launch was criticized. TouchArcade's Eric Ford found the touch controls serviceable once players had acclimated to their sensitivity.

The microtransaction features of Spartan Assault were generally negatively received. While reviewers such as Carter felt that the microtransactions could be ignored and did not impact enjoyment of the game, Hillard wrote that "it's hard not to feel as though an important part of the game is being withheld after buying into the agreed-upon price of admission." Kollar considered the upgrades necessary to completing levels with a high score, and considered them "exploitative and unnecessary" in a game that cost money upfront. GameZone's Jake Valentine agreed, feeling XP was a scarce resource and the game heavily prodded players into shelling out real money instead.

Vanguard Games and 343 Industries announced a sequel to Halo: Spartan Assault, Halo: Spartan Strike in late 2014. This game was released as a digital download for Windows devices and Steam in 2015.
