= Halo (franchise) =

Video game series

- Logo used since Halo: Combat Evolved Anniversary
- Genres: First-person shooter (primary); Real-time strategy; Twin-stick shooter
- Developers: Bungie (2001–2010); Halo Studios (2011–2026); Activision (2026–present)
- Publishers: Xbox Game Studios (2001–2026); Activision (2026–present)
- Platforms: Xbox; Windows; Mac OS X; Xbox 360; Windows Phone; iOS; Xbox One; Arcade; Xbox Series X/S; PlayStation 5
- First release: Halo: Combat Evolved; November 15, 2001
- Latest release: Halo: Campaign Evolved; July 28, 2026

Halo is an American military science fiction video game series and media franchise, originally developed by Bungie and currently managed and developed by Activision and Halo Studios (previously 343 Industries), part of Microsoft's Xbox Game Studios. The series launched in November 2001 with the first-person shooter video game Halo: Combat Evolved and its tie-in novel, The Fall of Reach. The latest installment, Halo: Campaign Evolved, a remake of the original Combat Evolved campaign newly powered by Unreal Engine 5, was released in July 2026. Spinoffs include real-time strategy and twin-stick shooter games.

Bungie began as a developer of computer games for the Macintosh platform, making games including Marathon 2: Durandal (1995). After the company was acquired by Microsoft in 2000, their in-progress game, which started life as a real-time strategy game, became Halo: Combat Evolved, a first-person shooter and exclusive launch title for Microsoft's Xbox video game console. Following the success of Halo, Bungie developed additional Halo sequels before and after regaining its independence from Microsoft in 2007. Microsoft established 343 Industries to oversee Halo going forward, producing games itself and in partnership with other studios.

The developer was restructured and rebranded as Halo Studios in 2024, in conjunction with shifting the series away from being developed on proprietary game technology and multiplatform availability. Following the release of the remake Halo: Campaign Evolved in 2026, Xbox announced that Activision would produce Halo games, with Halo Studios supporting released titles.

Halo: Combat Evolved was the Xbox's flagship "killer app" and cemented Microsoft as a major competitor in the video game console space, and its sequels pioneered online matchmaking, social features, and video game marketing. The games have sold more than 81 million copies worldwide, with several titles being listed among the greatest video games of all time. With more than $6 billion in franchise sales, Halo is among the highest-grossing media franchises of all time, spanning novels, graphic novels, comic books, short films, animated films, feature films, fan-made short machinima animations and other licensed products.

== Story ==
Millions of years ago, the Precursors, a powerful intergalactic species, seeded the Milky Way with life. One of their created races, the Forerunners, attacked their former masters and drove the Precursors into near extinction. A few Precursors transformed themselves into dust, intending to regenerate themselves in the future. This dust became defective over time, and began infecting and contorting organisms throughout the galaxy. The resulting corruption created a new parasitic species, connected by a powerful hivemind: the Flood. Spacefaring ancient humanity, fighting the Flood, also came into conflict with the Forerunners. After defeating humanity, the Forerunners reduced humanity's technology and species to a primitive level, while they concentrated on the threat of the Flood. The Forerunners conceived the Halo Array—ring-shaped megastructures and neural eradication weapons of last resort that would destroy all sentient life in the galaxy to stop the Flood's spread by starving it of biomass. The array could be activated from the Ark, a repository of sentient life outside the range of the Halos. Exhausting all other options, the Array was activated, ending the Flood outbreak. The surviving Forerunners reseeded life and left the Milky Way galaxy.

A human ship approaches a Halo megastructure under construction. Portions of the Ark are visible at the bottom. From the video game Halo 3 (2007).

Nearly a hundred thousand years later, in the 26th century, humanity—under the auspices of the Unified Earth Government, or UEG, and their United Nations Space Command, or UNSC—colonizes many worlds thanks to the development of faster-than-light "slipspace" (similar to hyperspace but slower, with passengers requiring use of cryogenic pods for long-haul flights) travel. Tensions between the government and colonies desiring independence sparks violence and terrorism. The UNSC's Office of Naval Intelligence (ONI) creates the SPARTAN-II Project to create an elite group of enhanced supersoldiers to suppress the rebellions. In the year 2525, human worlds come under attack by a theocratic alliance of alien races known as the Covenant, whose leadership declares humanity an affront to their gods, the Forerunners. The Covenant thus begin a genocidal holy war, in which their superior technology and numbers prove to be decisive advantages. Although tactically effective, the Spartans are too few and spread too thin to turn the tide of the war in humanity's favor. In the aftermath of the Covenant's invasion of Reach in 2552, humanity's last stronghold defending Earth, John-117 is left as one of the few remaining SPARTAN-IIs.

The rediscovery of the Halo rings prompts a desperate battle against the Covenant, who believe they are instruments of transcendence, not destruction. Master Chief and his artificial intelligence Cortana are essential in the destruction of a Halo ring to stop the Covenant and the threat of the Flood. Turmoil within the Covenant and the revelation of the Halo Array's true purpose leads to the Covenant splintering into civil war. The disgraced former Covenant commander known as the Arbiter, along with many of his species, helps the humans stop the Covenant leadership from activating the Halo Array via the Ark. The Human-Covenant War ends.

In the post-war era, the UNSC trains a new generation of Spartans, and tensions between the UNSC and rebels resume. The Master Chief and Cortana accidentally free the Forerunner commander Didact and he briefly returns to assert supremacy over humanity. Master Chief and Cortana halt his plans, although Cortana is initially believed dead in the attempt. Cortana's survival through the Domain leads her to break with the UNSC and assert a new hegemony over the galaxy, with artificial intelligence (the "Created") in control. After two years of a scattered war between Cortana and the UNSC, Cortana attacks the Banished, a mercenary organization of former Covenant races. The Banished win the resultant conflict, terminating Cortana and battling the UNSC for control of Zeta Halo.

== Game series ==
Release timeline Mainline entries in bold
2001	**Halo: Combat Evolved**
2002
2003
2004	**Halo 2**
2005
2006
2007	**Halo 3**
2008
2009	Halo Wars
2009	**Halo 3: ODST**
2010	**Halo: Reach**
2011	Halo: Combat Evolved Anniversary
2012	**Halo 4**
2013	Halo: Spartan Assault
2014	Halo: The Master Chief Collection
2015	Halo: Spartan Strike
2015	**Halo 5: Guardians**
2016
2017	Halo Wars 2
2018	Halo: Fireteam Raven
2018	Halo Recruit
2019
2020
2021	**Halo Infinite**
2022
2023
2024
2025
2026	Halo: Campaign Evolved

=== 2001–2010: Bungie games ===
Bungie originated the Halo game series and developed games from 2001 to 2010.

Video game studio Bungie was founded in 1991 by Alex Seropian in Chicago, Illinois, who partnered with programmer Jason Jones the following year to market and release Jones' game Minotaur: The Labyrinths of Crete. Focusing on the Mac game market because it was smaller and easier to compete, Bungie became a preeminent game developer on the platform, releasing the successful Myth and Marathon. Bungie began development on a new game in 1997, referring to it by the temporary code names "Monkey Nuts" and later "Blam!" after Jones could not bring himself to say the previous codename to his mother. "Blam!" was conceived as a science fiction real-time strategy game and took place on a hollowed-out world called Solipsis. The planet eventually became a ringworld called "Halo", in turn giving the game its title.

As the development team began experimenting with incorporating vehicles with realistic physics simulations, they began moving the distant third-person camera closer to the action. Bungie decided it would be more fun to directly control units than direct them, and the game shifted to a third-person shooter. Halo was announced on July 21, 1999, during the Macworld Conference & Expo. The title of the game was finalized only days before it was announced at Macworld.

Bungie was undergoing financial difficulties, and Microsoft was looking for games for its upcoming Xbox video game console. In June 2000, Microsoft announced their acquisition of Bungie, and Halo—now having morphed into a first-person shooter—became a launch title for the Xbox video game console. Relocated from Chicago to Redmond, Washington, Bungie had roughly 14 months to finish the game before the Xbox launched. The story slowly began to take shape, with an internal debate at Bungie over how much personality to give the main character. Writer Joe Staten wanted to do more than have the player character be an "empty vessel" like Half-Life's Gordon Freeman, so they wrote him with a sense of humor. Deciding he should be referred to by his naval rank, Bungie decided on "Master Chief". Despite a difficult and hectic development schedule, Halo: Combat Evolved shipped as a launch title for the Xbox on November 15, 2001. The Xbox's marketing heavily featured Halo, whose green color palette meshed with the console's design scheme. Halo was a critical and commercial success, selling alongside half of every Xbox sold. By July 2006, the game had sold 4.2 million copies and earned $170 million in the United States.

Halo: Combat Evolved introduced many elements common to the franchise. Players battle enemies on foot and in vehicles to complete objectives across a mysterious alien landscape. Halo limited the number of weapons players could carry to two, forcing them to carefully select their preferred armament. Players fight with ranged and melee attacks, as well as grenades. Bungie referred to the "weapons-grenades-melee" format as the "Golden Triangle of Halo". The player's has health measured in hit points that must be replenished with health packs, but also has a perpetually recharging energy shield.

While Halo had not been intended as a franchise, the Bungie team wanted to make an ambitious sequel, looking to story and gameplay ideas that had been ultimately cut from Combat Evolved, and inspired by how fans had received the game. In particular, Bungie was surprised by how many fans used the System Link capability to network consoles together and play multiplayer in LAN parties. With the launch of the Xbox Live online multiplayer service, Bungie wanted to bring Halo multiplayer to the internet.

Halo 2, was announced on August 8, 2002, at Microsoft's X02 press event, and an impressive demo of the game was shown at Electronic Entertainment Expo the following year. The demo showed off new features like dual-wielding weapons and hijacking enemy vehicles, but behind the scenes the game was undergoing a troubled development; Bungie had to scrap the ambitious graphics engine as it would not run effectively on the Xbox hardware, leadership changes resulted in more infighting, and artists and designers wasted time developing assets that would ultimately not ship in the game. A planned massive multiplayer mode was entirely cut, leading to developer Max Hoberman's smaller-scale local mode becoming the only multiplayer offering. As the game's release date slipped, the studio entered a sustained period of crunch to finish the game, with other Bungie games being canceled and their staff absorbed into the Halo team. The final act of the game had to be cut entirely in the rush to complete the game. Halo 2 was released on the Xbox on November 9, 2004, and later for Windows Vista in 2007. Part of the marketing took the form of an alternative reality game, I Love Bees, centered around a website apparently hacked by a mysterious intelligence. Over the course of the game, audio clips were released that formed a narrative set on Earth between Halo and Halo 2. Halo 2 was a critical and commercial success, grossing $125 million in the first day and becoming the highest-grossing release in entertainment history up to that point; it would ultimately sell 8 million copies, becoming the best-selling Xbox game. Halo 2 was also a significant motivator for subscriptions to the Xbox Live multiplayer service.

Frustrated by the development of Halo 2 and wanting to move on to new non-Halo projects, Bungie wanted to wrap things up in a satisfying manner with Halo 3. Burned out by Halo 2, Jason Jones went on an extended sabbatical, and the Halo 3 effort started without direction as no one was definitively in charge. Designer Paul Bertone recalled that the large development staff (70–80 people) meant more meetings and less efficiency. Multiple staff members temporarily or permanently departed the development team, including Hoberman, who started his own studio, Certain Affinity after developing Halo 3's online systems. Despite the difficult development, overall Halo 3's development went more smoothly than Halo 2. Halo 3 was announced at the 2006 Electronic Entertainment Expo, and released on the Xbox 360 on September 25, 2007. It added new gameplay elements, including deployable equipment and heavy weapons. The game also added a limited map-editing tool, known as Forge, which allows players to insert game objects, such as weapons and vehicles, into existing multiplayer map geometry. A saved films feature allowed players to record gameplay and review it from any angle. Backed by an extensive marketing campaign, Halo 3 was a critical and commercial success, grossing $170 million in the U.S. in the first 24 hours. The game was the best-selling title of the year in the U.S., and the fourteenth best-selling game of the 2000s.

Lingering dissatisfaction with Bungie's acquisition by Microsoft in 2000 and a desire for more favorable profit-sharing on Halo 3 led to an agreement where Bungie would become an independent studio after shipping a set number of new Halo games. Bungie announced their independence in October 2007. They were contractually obligated to produce two more Halo games as part of the deal. One project turned into the game Halo: Reach, while the other was initially going to be a production with Peter Jackson's Wingnut Interactive. When that project was scrapped, Bungie took elements prototyped for it and added them to a smaller Halo 3 expansion, originally titled Halo 3: Recon.

Produced using the Halo 3 engine and assets and with a smaller staff of only around 20 full-time employees, Recon—later renamed Halo 3: ODST—was conceived as a noir detective story, with the player character uncovering clues in a hub world that triggered playable flashbacks. Halo 3: ODST takes place between the events of Halo 2, and Halo 3. The player had flexibility to explore and play missions in any order. Bungie staffers recalled that getting resources for the game was tough, as most of the studio's attention was on Halo: Reach. In the game, players assume the role of weaker Orbital Drop Shock Troopers (ODSTs) rather than Spartan supersoldiers. Gameplay harkens back to Combat Evolved, with the use of health packs and scoped pistols. A night-vision mode illuminates dark environments and highlights friends and foes. In addition to shipping with the complete Halo 3 multiplayer, ODST also added a cooperative survival mode called Firefight, where players fight against waves of enemies with limited lives. Halo 3: ODST released September 22, 2009, and was positively received, though its price as a full game (rather than a cheaper expansion) was sometimes criticized. It was the top-selling title of the month in the U.S. and ultimately sold more than three million copies worldwide. Eurogamer pointed to the work Bungie put into the more experimental Halo title as influencing the direction of its first post-Halo game, Destiny.

Tired of focusing on the character of Master Chief, Bungie cast Halo: Reach as a prequel to Combat Evolved, taking place on the doomed human world of Reach as it falls under attack from the Covenant. The step backwards in the timeline was mirrored by the gameplay, which Bungie wanted to harken to Combat Evolved with more open environments and exploration, and the return of health packs. Among the new additions were the replacement of single-use equipment with persistent armor abilities that enables sprinting, jetpacks, or temporary invincibility. The game's release was preceded by a beta to help balance the game and squash bugs. Reach released September 14, 2010, and was a success, making $200 million its first day and selling more than 4.7 million units by September 2011.

=== 2011–2021: 343 Industries games ===
343 Industries was established by Microsoft Game Studios in 2007 to oversee the Halo games and associated media.

While Bungie finished their association with Halo, the rights to the franchise remained with Microsoft. Bonnie Ross, Xbox general manager at the time, recalled that her colleagues felt Halo was a waning property and wanted to outsource new game development, while Ross argued for an internal studio. Ross' vision won out, and she was put in charge of a new internal Halo studio, 343 Industries, named after the character 343 Guilty Spark. The studio started with a small staff in late 2007.

While 343 Industries worked with Bungie on ODST and Reach, the new company's first game project was Halo: Combat Evolved Anniversary, a remaster of the franchise's debut title. The game was developed in partnership with Saber Interactive, with 343 Industries handling creative and Saber the engineering. Saber had just one year to develop the game in anticipation of Combat Evolved's tenth anniversary. Players can switch between the original graphics and updated visuals with a button press. Both classic and new graphics are presented in high-definition, 16:9 widescreen compared to the original game's 480i resolution and 4:3 aspect ratio. Certain Affinity helped develop multiplayer maps for the game, beginning a long collaboration between the two studios. Reviews were generally positive, though critics disagreed if the original, unaltered gameplay held up to modern standards.

343 Industries began staffing up their studio while beginning development on the next major Halo title, eventually growing to nearly 200, and decided where they wanted to take Master Chief's story over the course of future games. Ryan Payton was initially offered the role of creative director, but his ideas for the game did not mesh with the expected first-person shooter focus, and before prototyping was done Payon was replaced and ultimately left in 2011. Josh Holmes took over as creative designer, and the studio shifted focus from ideating to producing the game in earnest. The result was a more safe, straightforward sequel to Halo 3. Holmes wanted the game's story mode to explore Master Chief's relationship with Cortana, who would break down into a dementia-like state. Struggling with making the plot accessible for new players, the team considered dropping the storyline. Holmes, drawing inspiration from his own mother's battle with dementia, insisted it stayed in.

Halo 4 was announced at E3 2011 and released November 6, 2012. The game picks up years after the events of Halo 3, as Master Chief and Cortana arrive at a Forerunner world called Requiem, fighting against first the Covenant and then a new threat. The game achieved record first-day sales for the franchise. While reviews were generally positive, the story was criticized for being incomprehensible to casual players and relying on knowledge of the wider franchise media.

Intending to create a 10th anniversary edition of Halo 2, like they had with Combat Evolved, 343 Industries, Saber Interactive, Certain Affinity and other studios collaborated on Halo: The Master Chief Collection, repacking Combat Evolved Anniversary, Halo 2 Anniversary, Halo 3 and Halo 4 in a single collection for the Xbox One console. The launch was marred with glitches and matchmaking issues, which required numerous patches to fix. Ross apologized to fans for the state of the game, and promised future Halo games would have public betas. Reach and ODST were subsequently added to the collection, which was ported to PC and received enhancements for the Xbox Series X.

343 Industries' next installment, Halo 5: Guardians, was announced in 2014. The game takes place across many worlds, mainly the Sangheili homeworld, and revolves around Spartan Locke's hunt for the rogue Master Chief, who is trying to find a still-living Cortana.

The third part of the Reclaimer Saga, Halo Infinite, was announced during E3 2018. It brings the focus back to Master Chief, and Halo's roots by taking place on the new Zeta Halo. The story mainly focuses on exploring the deeper lore of the Halo series, finding what happened to Cortana, and battles with the Banished. It released December 2021.

=== 2024–2026: Halo Studios rebranding and Campaign Evolved ===
343 Industries rebranded as Halo Studios to mark shifts with the development of the Halo franchise, including the availability of the series on platforms beyond Xbox and Windows for the first time.

On October 6, 2024, 343 Industries unveiled a seven-minute video where they confirmed multiple new games were currently in development using Unreal Engine 5 as opposed to the proprietary Slipspace Engine. They also rebranded as Halo Studios. Studio head Pierre Hintze explained that the decision to rebrand the studio came from an internal shift in development philosophy behind the franchise, giving the team a "clean break" as was the case with transitioning between Bungie and 343. Following Microsoft Gaming CEO Phil Spencer teasing the franchise's return for the following year at the Xbox Games Showcase in June 2025, a Halo Waypoint blogpost later that month disclosed that Halo Studios would unveil one of their new Halo projects in Unreal Engine 5 at the Halo World Championships in October.

The project was revealed to be Halo: Campaign Evolved, a full remake of the original Combat Evolved's campaign set to release in 2026 for Windows, Xbox Series X/S and PlayStation 5, marking the franchise's debut on Sony consoles. Halo Studios community manager Brian Jarrard viewed Campaign Evolved as marking a new era for the franchise that encouraged the existing Halo community to welcome in new players joining from PlayStation, asserting that future entries going forward would also be released on Sony's consoles.

=== Future ===
Following Asha Sharma's succession from Phil Spencer as CEO of Xbox in early 2026, the division underwent significant restructuring to consolidate fewer studios around core IP. The Information reported in June that Xbox planned to accelerate the release cadence of tentpole franchises, particularly citing the Halo series among other properties that would see increased investment as the publisher oriented its business around AAA titles.

In September 2026, Xbox announced that as part of their ongoing structural 'reset', responsibilities for the Halo IP, including the next mainline entry, had been transferred to subsidiary Activision, which was assembling a purpose-built team for the project separate from their ongoing work for the Call of Duty franchise. Activision president Rob Kostich said in a statement that their goal with the property was to make "the greatest Halo game ever" and to stay true to the universe, legacy and community. This development coincided with an elimination of 268 positions across their first-party development teams including Halo Studios, which was downsized to maintain support over current and legacy games such as Campaign Evolved and The Master Chief Collection.

=== Spin-offs ===
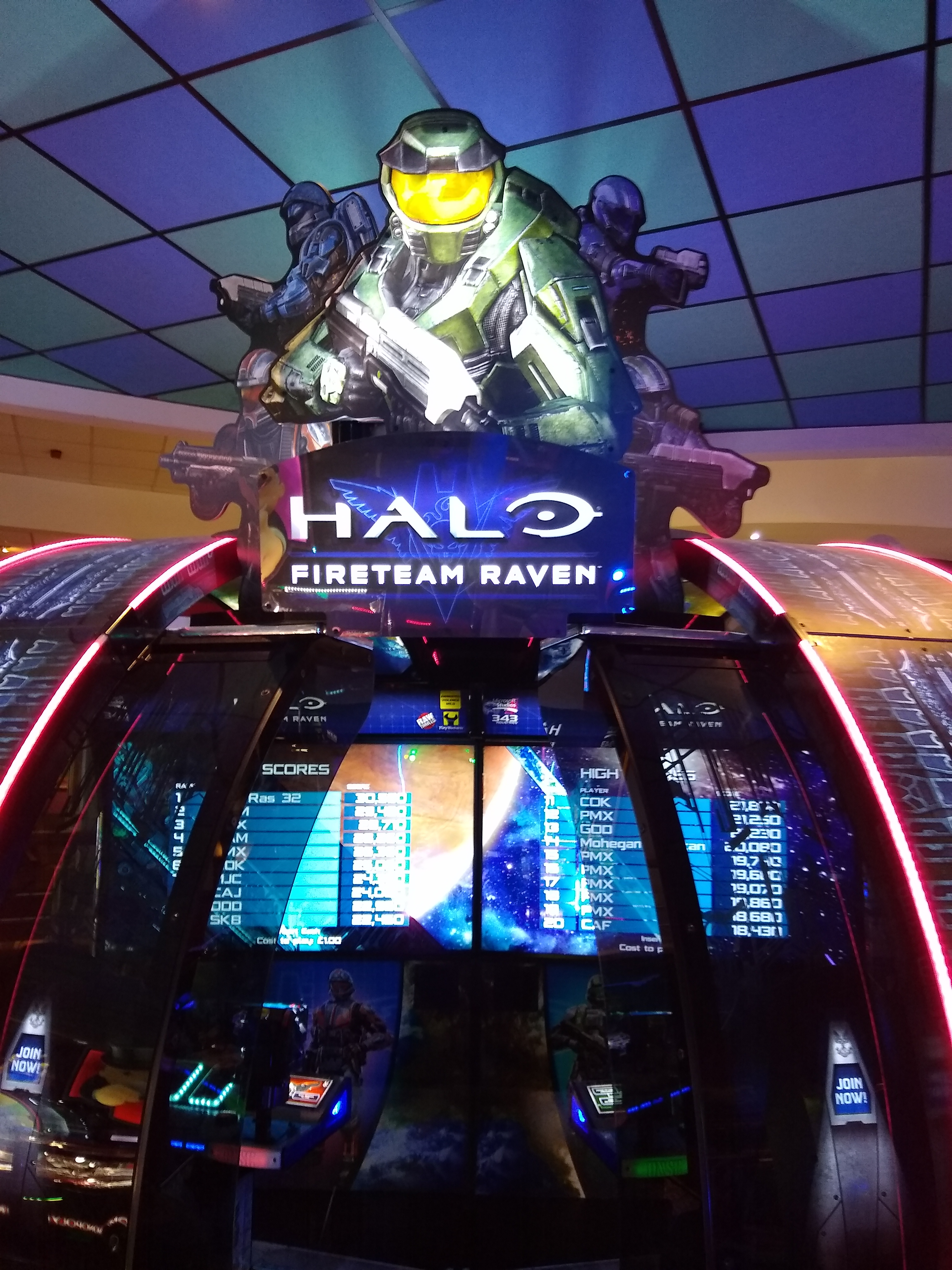
A Fireteam Raven arcade booth in Edinburgh, UK

Halo returned to its real-time strategy roots with Halo Wars, developed by Ensemble Studios for the Xbox 360 and released in 2009. The game takes place years prior to the events of Halo: Combat Evolved. Ensemble spent six months developing a control scheme that was simple and intuitive for console strategy games, traditionally considered inferior to their keyboard-and-mouse-driven computer game siblings. The game received generally positive reviews from critics, and sold an estimated 2.6 million units, a massive success for the genre on consoles. Halo Wars was Ensemble's last project as a studio before shuttering; post-release updates and content were developed by Robot Entertainment. A sequel, Halo Wars 2, was developed by Creative Assembly and released on Xbox One and PC platforms simultaneously in February 2017.

Interested in bringing Halo to mobile devices, 343 Industries partnered with Vanguard Games to produce Halo: Spartan Assault, a twin-stick shooter initially released on Windows 8 tablets and phones in 2013; the game later came to the Xbox and iOS platforms, and was the first Halo game released on Steam. Spartan Assault was followed by a sequel, Halo: Spartan Strike, in 2015.

Another game, Halo 2600, has the players control Master Chief and fight through 64 screens with varied enemies. It was written by Ed Fries, former vice president of game publishing at Microsoft, in 2010 for the Atari 2600.

Other Halo spinoffs include a virtual reality experience, Halo Recruit, and Halo: Fireteam Raven, a coin-operated arcade game developed by Raw Thrills and PlayMechanix released in 2018, starting with Round1 USA and Dave & Buster's arcades. Fireteam Raven takes place during the events of Halo: Combat Evolved and puts the players in control of up to four ODST members fighting against the Covenant.

=== Defunct projects ===
Unreleased or cancelled Halo projects include an episodic video game, Halo: Chronicles, announced in 2006. To be developed by film director Peter Jackson's Wingnut Interactive, it was canceled as part of budget cuts tied to job layoffs in January 2009. Ensemble Studios developed a Halo-themed massively multiplayer online game, Titan. The project was canceled internally in 2007–2008, as Microsoft lost interest in a PC-based game. Certain Affinity was slated to develop their own Halo title, but it was never greenlit because the team was needed to develop the Halo Waypoint online portal instead. A Mega Bloks-branded spinoff game, similar to the style of Lego video games, was prototyped for the Xbox 360 but not pursued; footage of the game leaked several years later in 2017.

343 Industries announced a free-to-play Halo multiplayer game for Windows PC, Halo Online, in 2015. The game launched with a closed beta test limited to Russia that year. The title was developed with Saber Interactive using a modified version of the Halo 3 engine, and published by Innova Systems. The project was canceled in August 2016. Players modified the game to circumvent the region limitations and add new content after the project's official cancellation. This "ElDewrito" project saw legal takedowns from Microsoft for violating its game usage rules. The modders claimed its ElDewrito's popularity hastened Microsoft's plans to release a Windows version of Halo: The Master Chief Collection, which would later include content from Halo Online.

== Cultural influences and themes ==
Bungie acknowledged that the Halo series' use of ring-shaped megastructures followed on from concepts featured in Larry Niven's Ringworld and Iain M. Banks' Culture series (of which Consider Phlebas and Excession were said to be particularly influential.) Jaime Griesemer commented that the influence of Ringworld was less in the appearance of the Halo rings, but instead "in that feeling of being somewhere else. That sense of scale and an epic story going on out there." Griesemer also explained, "One of the main sources of inspiration was Armor [by John Steakley], in which a soldier has to constantly re-live the same war over and over again. That sense of hopelessness, a relentless battle, was influential." The Flood were influenced by the assimilating alien species in Christopher Rowley's The Vang; it has also been speculated that the Master Chief's name "John 117" may have been a reference to a character named Jon 6725416 in Rowley's Starhammer, or to the John Spartan character of Demolition Man, or even the Bible verse | John 1:17. An IGN article exploring the literary influences present in the Halo franchise commented on similarities between Halo and Orson Scott Card's Ender's Game: aspects of the SPARTAN Project and the design of the Covenant Drones are perceived as reminiscent of the super soldier program and Buggers found in the novel. Bungie has also acknowledged James Cameron's film Aliens as a strong cinematic influence.

A report written by Roger Travis and published by The Escapist compares Halo with the Latin epic Aeneid, written by classical Roman poet Virgil. Travis posits similarities between the plots of both works and compares the characters present in them, with the Flood and Covenant taking the role performed by the Carthaginians and Master Chief taking the role of Aeneas.

The Halo franchise draws heavily from religious iconography and nomenclature. The Flood and especially the Gravemind serve as demonic or satanic figures, and the Master Chief's first encounter with the Flood can be likened to a journey to hell. Academic P.C. Paulissen notes that the name 'Flood' suggests a reference to the biblical deluge, with the Forerunner Ark being shelter from the Flood's destructive and cleansing power akin to the Bible.

== Esports ==
Players began creating impromptu Halo tournaments and local parties after the release of the first game. Bungie looked at the success of these matches as inspiration for crafting the online multiplayer components of Halo 2. Larger organizations soon began operating Halo competitive games. In August 2002, G4 hosted the Halo National Championship Finals, a free-for-all tournament involving sixteen players from across the country (hosted by Wil Wheaton of Star Trek fame.) The Associates of Gaming Professionals (AGP), which focused solely on Halo, held its first event in November 2002. Inspired by friends placing bets on their Halo matches, Mike Sepso and Sundance DiGiovanni formed Major League Gaming the same year.

Microsoft and 343 Industries sponsored their own professional Halo league, called the Halo Championship Series (HCS), in 2014. It was started in partnership with the Electronic Sports League (ESL). Seasons 1 and 2 ran on The Master Chief Collection. In August 2015 Microsoft announced it would be increasing the total prize pool of the HCS to US$1 million, for the debut event for Halo 5, the Halo World Championship. Crowd-funding contributed to a US$2.5 million prize pool, the largest console esports prize pool ever.

== Music ==
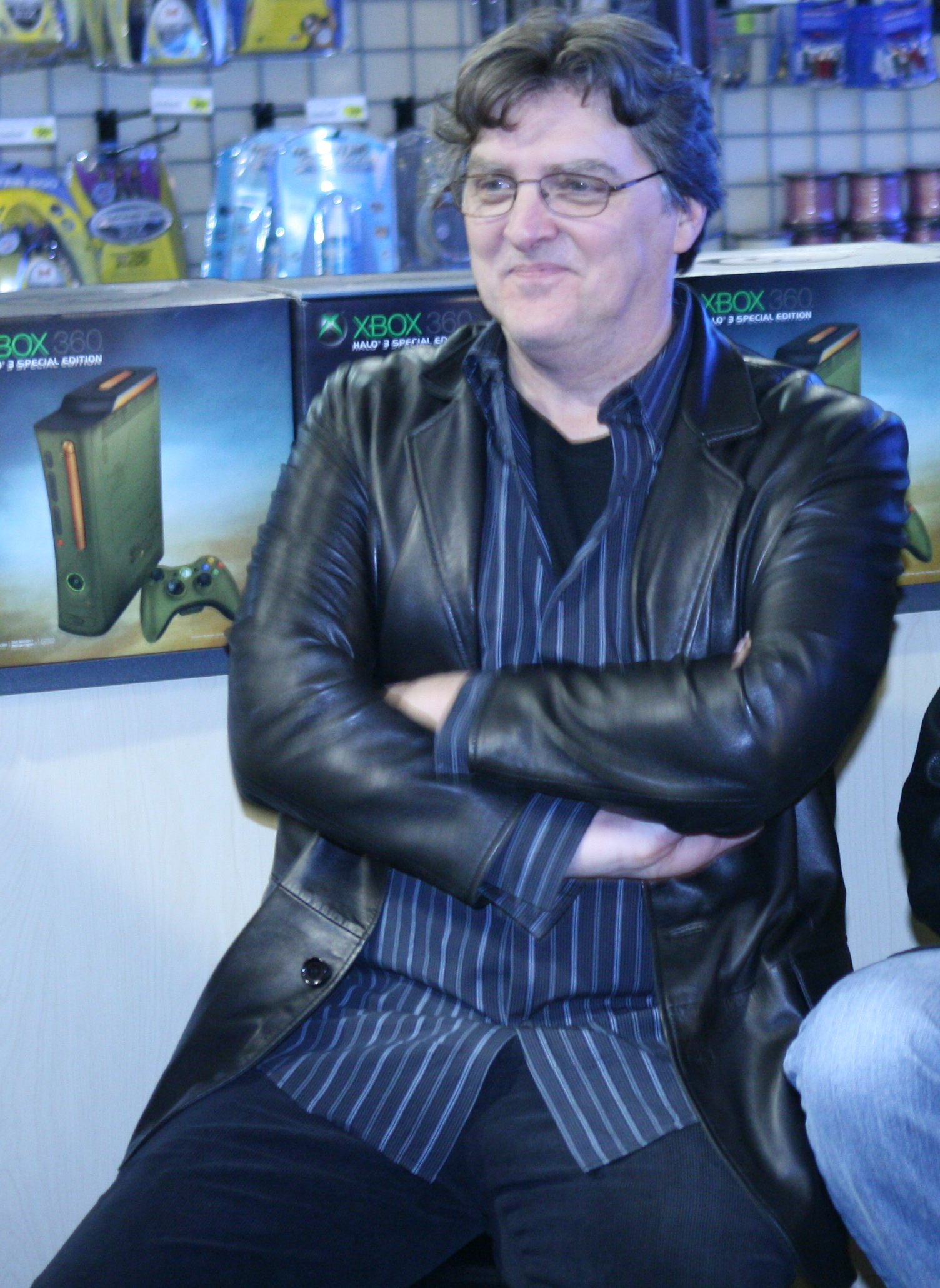
Martin O'Donnell, lead composer for the Bungie Halo games

Martin O'Donnell and Michael Salvatori collaborated to produce the soundtracks for Bungie's Halo games. Approached by Bungie to produce something ancient and mysterious for Halo's debut, O'Donnell decided to use Gregorian chant, joining in with others to sing the vocal parts. The music was designed to change dynamically based on what was occurring in-game; for a more enjoyable listening experience on the soundtrack releases, O'Donnell arranged the music into standalone suites. For Halo 2, the soundtrack included licensed music from Incubus and Breaking Benjamin alongside the orchestral score; Steve Vai contributed guitar solos. Halo 3's music brought back themes from the original game to help tie together the end of the trilogy. Unlike previous soundtracks, where much of the music had been synthesized on computer, the soundtrack for Halo 3 was recorded using a 60-piece orchestra, along with a 24-voice chorus. ODST incorporated more jazz and noir elements, like saxophones, while O'Donnell wrote more somber music to reflect the darker campaign for Reach.

Halo 4 audio director Sotaro Tojima began looking for a composer for the game in 2010, deciding on Neil Davidge after a year's search. The music of Halo 4 was composed by Neil Davidge and Kazuma Jinnouchi. Davidge thought that scoring the video game would be similar to the process for a film, but discovered the dynamic nature of video games demanded a different approach. Much of Halo 4's music was written on guitar or piano; at home, Davidge would sometimes sing melodies into a dictaphone for later transcription. While composing, he used the game's unfinished spaces and concept art as inspiration. Additional music was composed by Kazuma Jinnouchi, who served as the sole composer for Halo 5. Being in-house at 343 Industries afforded Jinnouchi an early insight into the project, and he found it a less challenging task than his work on Halo 4.

The music for Halo Infinite was a collaboration between Gareth Coker, Curtis Schweitzer, Joel Corelitz, Alex Bhore, and Eternal Time & Space, overseen by 343 Industries Music Supervisor Joel Yarger. Infinite's soundtrack was released digitally on December 8, 2021.

Other composers who have worked on Halo titles includes Stephen Rippy, who listened to O'Donnell's soundtracks for inspiration and incorporated the Halo theme into parts of his arrangements for Halo Wars; Gordy Haab, Brian Lee White, and Brian Trifon, who composed music for the sequel, Halo Wars 2; and Tom Salta who has worked on projects including Halo 2 Anniversary and Spartan Assault.

The music of Halo helped spur a renewed interest in chant music. The Halo theme is a gaming anthem, and in the late 2010s led to videos of teenagers congregating to sing the tune.

== Other media ==
The Halo franchise includes various types of merchandise and adaptations outside of the video games. This includes bestselling novels, graphic novels, and other licensed products. Numerous action figures and vehicles based on Halo have been produced. Joyride Studios created Halo and Halo 2 action figures, while Halo 3 poseable and collectible action figures, aimed at collectors, were produced by McFarlane Toys and became some of the top-selling action figures of 2007 and 2008. MEGA Bloks has partnered with Microsoft to produce Halo-themed toys.

=== Books ===
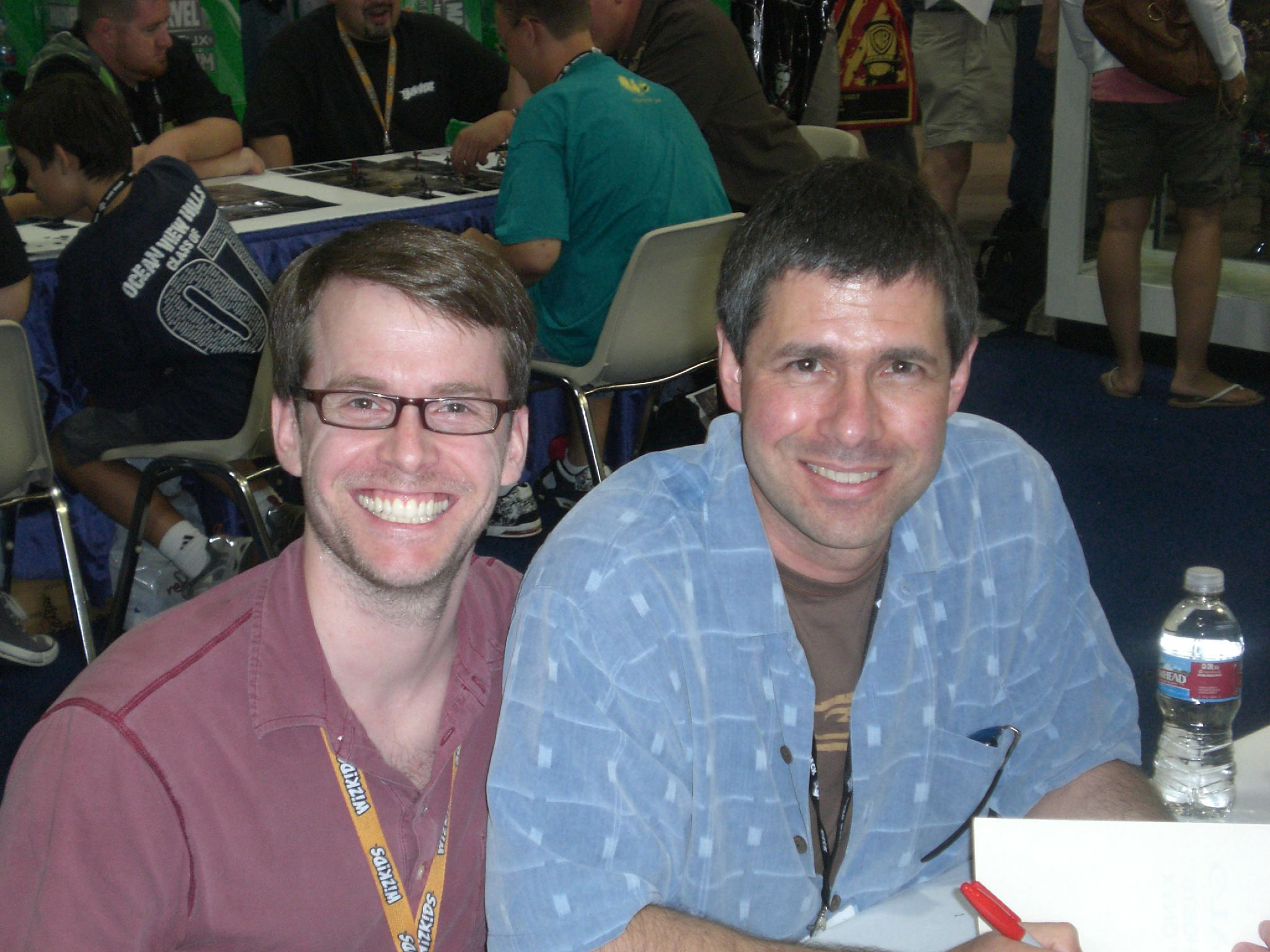
Halo authors Joseph Staten and Eric Nylund

As part of Microsoft's multimedia efforts, Microsoft Studios decided to create a tie-in novel for Combat Evolved. Eric Nylund wrote Halo: The Fall of Reach in seven weeks, and it was published in October 2001. Nylund would write additional Halo works including the novels First Strike (2003) and Ghosts of Onyx (2006). The game itself was turned into a novelization by William C. Dietz in 2003, called Halo: The Flood. Other novels have been written by Joseph Staten (Contact Harvest), Tobias S. Buckell, Karen Traviss, Greg Bear (The Forerunner Saga), Matt Forbeck, John Shirley, Troy Denning, Cassandra Rose Clarke, and Kelly Gay. Two short story collections, Halo: Evolutions (2009) and Halo: Fractures (2015), have also been released.

=== Comics ===
The Halo universe was adapted into comics in 2006 with the release of The Halo Graphic Novel, a collection of four short stories published by Marvel Comics. Marvel produced a number of other Halo comic series. Halo: Uprising, by Brian Michael Bendis and Alex Maleev, bridges the gap between the events of Halo 2 and Halo 3; initially planned to conclude shortly before the release of Halo 3 in 2007, delays led to the final issue being published in 2009. Two additional comic runs were announced in 2009. Peter David's series, Halo: Helljumper, is set prior to Halo: Combat Evolved and focuses on the elite Orbital Drop Shock Troopers. The five-part series was published between July and November 2009. Fred Van Lente's series, Halo: Blood Line, revolves around a black ops team of Spartan supersoldiers assigned to the UNSC Office of Naval Intelligence, and debuted in December 2009. Marvel also released a three-part comic adaptation of the novel Halo: The Fall of Reach in 2011.

Dark Horse Comics has produced a number of Halo series, beginning with the three-part series Halo: Initiation, released in August 2013. Also announced was Halo: Escalation, an ongoing comic series covering the period directly after Halo 4; it ran for 24 issues from 2013 to 2015.

=== Live-action ===
==== Unproduced feature ====
In 2005, Columbia Pictures president Peter Schlessel began working outside the studio system to produce a Halo film adaptation. Alex Garland wrote a script, which was then pitched to studios by couriers dressed as Master Chief. Microsoft's terms required $10 million against 15 percent of gross; most studios passed, citing the lack of risk for Microsoft compared to their large share of potential profits. 20th Century Fox and Universal Pictures decided to partner to produce the film, paying Microsoft $5 million to option the film and 10 percent of grosses. Peter Jackson was slated to be the executive producer, with Neill Blomkamp as director. Before Blomkamp signed on, Guillermo del Toro was in negotiations to direct.

D. B. Weiss and Josh Olson rewrote Garland's script during 2006. Pre-production of the film was halted and restarted several times. Later that year, 20th Century Fox threatened to pull out of the project, leading Universal to issue an ultimatum to Jackson and Schlessel: either reduce their large "first-dollar" revenue deals, or the project was ended. Both refused, and the project stalled. Blomkamp would produce a series of live-action shorts as promotion for Halo 3, collectively titled Halo: Landfall. The rights for the film reverted to Microsoft.

==== Halo 4: Forward Unto Dawn ====
Halo 4: Forward Unto Dawn is a live-action film and miniseries set in the Halo universe. Although shot as a feature-length film, Forward Unto Dawn was originally released as a webseries consisting of five episodes released between October 5, 2012, and November 2, 2012. The series' plot, occurring in the early days of the Human-Covenant War, revolves around Thomas Lasky, a young cadet at Corbulo Academy of Military Science, and his relationship with the Master Chief. Lasky serves as a prominent character in Halo 4. The film cut was released on Blu-ray and DVD on December 4, 2012.

==== Halo: Nightfall ====
On April 3, 2014, it was announced that Ridley Scott and his production company, Scott Free Productions, were working on a Halo digital movie alongside 343 Industries and Xbox Entertainment Studios; Scott would be the executive producer, with David W. Zucker and Sergio Mimica-Gezzan as the directors. The feature was expected to follow the same format as Machinima's Halo 4: Forward Unto Dawn. On June 9, 2014, it was announced at E3 2014 that the feature, titled Halo: Nightfall, would be included with Halo: The Master Chief Collection at its November 2014 launch. The feature introduces a new character to the franchise, Agent Jameson Locke, played by actor Mike Colter; Nightfall is considered to be his origin story. Locke is one of the Spartans portrayed on the cover art and plays a large role in the series. On July 24, 2014, 343 Industries released the first trailer for the feature. Halo: Nightfall is available to watch through Halo Channel, an application for the Xbox One, Windows 8.1 and Windows Phone. On March 16, 2015, the series became available to stream, download, and buy on physical disc.

==== Paramount+ television series ====
On May 21, 2013, Xbox Entertainment Studios and 343 announced that a live-action television show of Halo would be produced with Steven Spielberg serving as executive producer through what is now Amblin Television, with the series set to premiere on the American premium cable network Showtime. The series subsequently sat in development hell for many years; the series began casting in 2019 and filming in 2021. The series premiered on Paramount+ on March 24, 2022.

=== Animation ===
Microsoft announced at Comic-Con 2009 that it was overseeing production of a series of seven short anime films, together called Halo Legends. Financed by 343 Industries, the animation was created by six Japanese production houses: Bee Train Production, Bones, Casio Entertainment, Production I.G., Studio 4 °C, and Toei Animation. Shinji Aramaki, creator and director of Appleseed and Appleseed Ex Machina, served as the project's creative director. Warner Bros. distributed Legends on DVD and Blu-ray in February 2010. Six of the stories are officially part of the Halo canon, with the seventh, made by Toei, intended to be a parody of the universe.

An animated version of The Fall of Reach is included in the Halo 5: Guardians Limited Edition and Collector's Edition.

== Legacy ==
Date	Total units sold	Ref.
August 30, 2007	14.5+ million	
January 8, 2009	25+ million	
May 24, 2010	34+ million	
October 31, 2012	46+ million	
October 19, 2014	60+ million	
July 13, 2015	65+ million	
February 24, 2021	81+ million	

Sales of games in the Halo series were more than 81 million by 2021. Total franchise sales were reported at $6 billion the same year. Non-game merchandise grosses counted for $1.8 billion of that figure. Many of the Halo novels have appeared on Publishers Weekly, USA Today and The New York Times bestsellers lists, and multiple Halo soundtracks have charted on the Billboard 200.

Variety called Halo "the equivalent of Star Wars". The musical theme and Master Chief are considered gaming icons, and the Chief and Halo are considered important mascots and aspects of the Xbox brand. Characters and elements from the series have made their way to other games such as Dead or Alive, Guitar Hero, Killer Instinct, Forza, and Fortnite.

Halo redefined first-person shooters on consoles and was a major component in the Xbox's early success, serving as the console's killer app. In a retrospective of Halo 2, journalist Anthony John Agnello described the game's impact as akin to the asteroid hit that killed the dinosaurs, remaking the gaming landscape and creating the modern conception of games as shared social experiences. GamesTM stated Halo: Combat Evolved "changed video game combat forever", and Halo 2 showcased Xbox Live as a tool for communities. Game Daily noted Halo 2's launch was "easily comparable to the biggest in other sectors of the entertainment industry", marking the first time a video game launch has become a major cultural event in the United States.

The original Halo trilogy has been frequently listed among the greatest video games of all time. In 2007 IGN listed Combat Evolved as the top Xbox game of all time, while readers ranked it the fourteenth best game ever on "IGN Readers' Choice 2006 – The Top 100 Games Ever". IGN listed Halo 2 as the number two top Xbox game of all time in March 2007. Halo 3 was nominated for and won multiple awards; it won Time magazine's "Game of the Year" and IGN chose it as the Best Xbox 360 Online Multiplayer Game and Innovative Design of 2007. Most publications called the multiplayer aspect one of the best features; IGN said the multiplayer map lineup was the strongest of the series, and GameSpy added that the multiplayer offering will greatly please "Halo veterans". Complaints focused on the game's plot. The New York Times said the game had a "throwaway" plot and Total Video Games judged the single-player aspect ultimately disappointing. The series' music and audio has received enthusiastic responses from game reviewers, with notably the Halo 2 Original Soundtrack becoming the first video game soundtrack to break the Billboard 200.

The Halo franchise spurred an array of productions in the machinima genre—the use of games for filmmaking. Most productions are set outside Halo canon, while others are based on fan fiction closely relating to the story. Microsoft updated its user license agreement to allow noncommercial distribution of such films. Among the notable machinima productions made with Halo is the comedy series Red vs. Blue created by Rooster Teeth Productions. It achieved an unparalleled level of success for Halo machinima specifically, and machinima in general. Other machinima series include Arby ‘n the Chief, The Codex, and the in-game interview show This Spartan Life.
