= Halo: Combat Evolved Anniversary =

2011 video game remaster

- Developers: 343 Industries (Note: Original game developed by Bungie. Ported to Windows as part of Halo: The Master Chief Collection by Splash Damage and Ruffian Games.); Saber Interactive
- Publisher: Microsoft Studios
- Composers: Martin O'Donnell; Michael Salvatori
- Series: Halo
- Engine: Saber3D Engine
- Platforms: Xbox 360; Xbox One; Windows
- Release: November 15, 2011: Xbox 360; WW: November 15, 2011; JP: November 17, 2011 The Master Chief Collection Xbox One; WW: November 11, 2014 Windows; WW: March 3, 2020
- Genre: First-person shooter
- Modes: Single-player; Multiplayer

Halo: Combat Evolved Anniversary is a 2011 first-person shooter game developed by 343 Industries, Saber Interactive, and Certain Affinity, and published by Microsoft Game Studios for the Xbox 360 console. It is a remaster of Halo: Combat Evolved (2001), originally developed by Bungie. Announced at the Electronic Entertainment Expo in 2011, it was released on November 15, 2011, the tenth anniversary of Combat Evolved and the original Xbox's release. Anniversary was later included as part of Halo: The Master Chief Collection for Xbox One in 2014, and for Windows and Xbox Series X/S in 2020.

343 Industries, an internal studio established by Microsoft in 2007, was given control over the Halo franchise after the release of Bungie's final entry, Halo: Reach, in 2010. 343 Industries approached Saber Interactive to develop a remaster of Combat Evolved for the game's tenth anniversary. Saber used its proprietary game engine to reproduce the graphics and the original Halo engine for gameplay. A development tool for toggling between the old and new visuals for comparison became a feature in the shipping game. Anniversary's enhancements include a complete high-definition visual overhaul, support for cooperative and multiplayer gameplay via the Xbox Live online service, new and remastered sound effects and music, and extras such as achievements, in-game collectibles, and Kinect support.

Critical reception to Anniversary was generally positive. The updated graphics, sounds, and ability to toggle between the remastered and original visuals were praised. Complaints included technical glitches, faults with the original game's level design, and the multiplayer implementation.

== Gameplay ==
By using the Back button, players can switch between the original game's graphics (top) and new graphics (bottom).

Halo: Combat Evolved Anniversary and the original, Halo: Combat Evolved, are identical in gameplay and plot. The game is a first-person shooter with portions of vehicular combat taking place from a third-person perspective. The story follows player character and protagonist Master Chief as he fights the alien Covenant on the mysterious ancient ringworld Halo. Players are equipped with a recharging energy shield that absorbs damage; players also have health that can only be replenished by health packs scattered across the game's levels. A variety of human and alien weapons and vehicles can be used.

Players can switch between the "classic" graphics of the original game and the new graphics developed for the remaster by pressing the Back button on the controller. Both classic and new graphics are presented in high-definition, 16:9 widescreen compared to the original game's 480i resolution and 4:3 aspect ratio. The remastered graphics are also available in stereoscopic 3D for compatible televisions.

Additions to the gameplay include Xbox Live achievements, online cooperative gameplay, hidden video terminals that provide additional story, and collectible skulls that modify gameplay when activated. Support for Xbox Kinect includes voice commands for video navigation, in-combat directives, and environment-scanning, which adds on-screen items to an in-game encyclopedia called the Library.

The original Combat Evolved did not support online multiplayer, but players could play multiplayer locally via split-screen or System Link LAN. Anniversary adds revamped multiplayer and two-player co-op campaign support available online via Xbox Live and offline locally. The game's multiplayer mode uses Halo: Reach's engine and features seven remakes of Combat Evolved and Halo 2 maps. Anniversary also includes a new map based on a campaign level for Firefight, a wave-based survival multiplayer game type in which players and their allies fight enemy groups of scaling difficulty. Anniversary introduced artificially intelligent Firefight allies to the series.

== Plot ==
After fleeing the Covenant's destruction of the human world Reach, the human ship Pillar of Autumn makes a random slipspace jump to avoid leading the Covenant to Earth. Arriving in uncharted space, the Autumn crew discover a massive ringworld orbiting a gas giant. When the Covenant attack, Autumn's captain, Jacob Keyes, entrusts the ship's artificial intelligence, Cortana—and her knowledge of defense deployments and the location of Earth—to the supersoldier known as the Master Chief for safekeeping. Master Chief fights off Covenant boarding parties and leaves the Autumn via a lifeboat for the surface of the ringworld, while Keyes directs the Autumn to "land" on the ring.

On the ringworld, Master Chief rallies human survivors and leads a boarding party to rescue Keyes from the Covenant's clutches. Keyes reveals that the Covenant call the ring "Halo", and believe it is some sort of weapon. Chief and Cortana reach Halo's control room, but Cortana becomes alarmed upon entering the ring's systems and sends Master Chief to find Keyes. Searching for the captain, Master Chief encounters the Flood, a parasitic organism that infects sentient life. The Flood's release prompts Halo's AI caretaker, 343 Guilty Spark, to enlist Master Chief's help in activating Halo's defenses. Master Chief's activation of the ring from the Control Room is stopped by Cortana, who reveals that Halo's defenses do not kill Flood, but rather their food—meaning that activating the ring would wipe out all sentient life in the galaxy. To stop the Flood from spreading and Spark from activating the ring, Cortana devises a plan to detonate the crashed Autumn's engines and destroy Halo, but require Keyes's command codes. Master Chief and Cortana attempt a rescue only to find that Keyes has been absorbed by the Flood. Fighting through Flood, Covenant, and Guilty Spark's robotic Sentinels, Master Chief and Cortana manually destabilize Autumn's reactors and narrowly escape the destruction of the ring on a fighter.

== Development ==
=== Overview ===
After Microsoft acquired Bungie in 2000, Bungie developed the original Halo: Combat Evolved as a 2001 launch game for the Xbox, Microsoft's first video game console. Following the release of Halo 3 in 2007, Bungie separated from Microsoft to become an independent company once again, but the rights to Halo remained with the latter, which formed an internal division to oversee Halo franchise development, although Bungie themselves would produce two more games, Halo 3: ODST (2009) and Halo: Reach (2010) as part of their obligations to the publisher. 343 Industries, the internal division, approached Saber Interactive with a proposal to remaster Combat Evolved for the game's tenth anniversary as the former were developing Halo 4 (2012), the series' next main entry. Saber's Chief Operating Officer Andrey Iones recalled that the offer was "an opportunity we [could not] miss", as Saber had never before worked on a major game franchise and many team members were fans of Halo. Saber developed concept art to form visual ideas for the remaster and then flew to Seattle, Washington, to meet with 343 Industries.

343 Industries wanted a complete remaster of the original game by the tenth anniversary of Halo's release, giving Saber just over a year to complete the project. The gameplay was to remain unchanged; while the original game had imbalanced elements, 343 Industries decided to preserve the game experience players remembered while introducing young fans to the game for perhaps the first time. The visuals, meanwhile, would be updated along with added features like campaign skulls. Iones recalled that experimentation with the game was limited—redoing keyframed character animations were off-limits because redoing them could introduce gameplay bugs, and design choices like game balance had already been determined. Likewise, porting the PC version of the game back to the Xbox to add features would have constrained the amount of visual improvements Saber could make, as well as requiring significant time training artists to use the same production pipelines that were used for Combat Evolved. Saber decided to use the original engine for the gameplay and its own for the visuals, despite the compatibility problems this solution presented. Development began under the codename Spark. The game was completed and released to manufacturing ("going gold") on October 15, 2011.

=== Design ===
To solve the issues of transferring information from the original game's engine to the Saber engine, the developers looked at how they used the third-party Havok physics engine to handle object positioning, velocities, and collisions. Saber created a proxy of every object in the Halo engine to transfer into the Saber engine, meaning that the game's original programming remained unchanged. The game's ability to alternate between the legacy and remastered graphics engines in the campaign was made possible by the rendering engine developed by Saber Interactive. The technology allowed the developers to update Halo: Combat Evolved's visuals and preserve the original gameplay. Originally, players would have chosen which graphical presentation to play from the main menu. The in-game toggle feature quickly became a talking point among the developers, who pushed for it to be available to other players. Since the ability to switch between classic version and remastered version was provided to players, both engines work simultaneously to retain the spontaneity of game. This approach caused several problems, including collision issues—because objects and environments in the original game were of a lower resolution with fewer polygons, higher-resolution visuals in the Saber engine could deviate from the original significantly. As the original game's geometry was used as the basis for collisions, in some cases characters could appear to walk through or above terrain, weapons could drop through the ground, and bullets would appear to be deflected by nothing. The sheer number of these issues, combined with the desire to keep the original gameplay intact, forced Saber to use a variety of approaches to fix the problems, including making tools for artists to visualize height differences and creating intermediate geometry. In some cases, the artists developed other ways of keeping to the same collision data while updating the visuals by changing the actual object—turning a blocky, low-polygon rock into an angular Forerunner structure avoided the collision issues.

Where possible, the developers drew on or adapted assets from Halo 3 and Reach. For elements that had no analogues, Microsoft sent art director Ben Cammarano to Saber's offices in St. Petersburg, Russia, to oversee the redesign of the game's visuals. Cammarano established four tenets of Halo—what Iones termed "heroic vistas, iconic imagery and characters, clean and vibrant aesthetics, and visceral action"—to guide Saber's artists. Since the original assets already existed, concept artists took screenshots from the original game and painted new imagery over them to show how environmental effects, improved lighting, and new textures could change the look of the levels. Some of Saber's visual designs were considered too much of a departure from the original game—while the artists had changed the position of the Halo ringworld and nearby planets to make a more pleasing skybox, Microsoft insisted maintaining continuity with the universe was more important and vetoed the changes. Vocal fans pointed out other inconsistencies with the game's visuals in pre-release trailers and pictures that Saber ultimately changed. Iones pointed to the floor designs of the Forerunner structures, the assault rifle, and the look of the Chief as places fans had an impact. The Chief's armor was redesigned from scratch instead of porting existing assets.

Saber doubted that it would be able to convert Combat Evolved's split-screen cooperative play to facilitate online play. Greg Hermann, a 343 Industries technical lead who had experience with Bungie technology, assisted Saber in development of a networking solution that would allow online co-op. Since the original game would behave identically when given the same scenario and inputs, only the player inputs needed to be synchronized between players' Xbox consoles.

Because of its previous contributions to the series—Halo 2's Blastacular and Halo: Reach's Defiant map pack—Certain Affinity was approached by 343 Industries to streamline the multiplayer maps to take Halo: Reach's gameplay options into account. The multiplayer is powered by the Halo: Reach engine. 343 Industries director Frank O'Connor said that the decision to use Reach for the multiplayer was controversial, even within the studio. "In Halo's day, there was never a proper networking mode," O'Connor explained. "We couldn't roll back the technology; [recreating Halo's local area network multiplayer] just wouldn't have worked with things like latency and all other modern Xbox Live-related problems. So we would have had to build it from scratch, and it still wouldn't have been the experience [players] remember." An additional consideration O'Connor mentioned was that producing a full replication of Combat Evolved's multiplayer would have divided the Halo player base and interrupted Reach's lifespan. In choosing which seven Halo maps to remake, 343 Industries set a number of rules—the map could not have been previously remade for a 360-era Halo title, it had to work with Reach's gameplay sandbox, and it had to be a fan favorite. The company retained the same art director between the campaign and multiplayer elements of Anniversary to make sure the two halves of the game looked visually cohesive.

Since 343 Industries developed Halo 4 concurrently with the anniversary edition, it decided to use Halo: Combat Evolved Anniversary to link the original trilogy with the upcoming Reclaimer trilogy by means of in-game collectibles similar to Halo 3's terminals, Halo 3: ODST's audio logs, and Halo: Reach's data pads. While the other games' collectibles were aimed at and enjoyed by serious Halo fiction fans, 343 Industries wanted to make Anniversary's terminals higher-budget, more impressive, and accessible to all players.

Though Iones described Anniversary's one-year development cycle as a "very smooth ride", some production issues that were not discovered until late in development contributed to bugs and other problems. Saber relied on a partially automated tool to render the game's cinematics, but did not do a thorough vetting of the results until after the game had reached the alpha stage of its release cycle. As a result, the developers realized that their addition of motion capture animation and lip-syncing had caused serious audio syncing issues and animation bugs.

=== Audio ===
The developers refreshed Combat Evolved's music and sound effects along with its visuals. While players can toggle the original music from Halo: Combat Evolved, the soundtrack was also re-recorded in partnership with Pyramind Studios, using the 75-piece Skywalker Symphony Orchestra and the Chanticleer vocal ensemble. Because there were no MIDI recordings of the original game's music, Paul Lipson, Lennie Moore, Tom Salta, and Brian Trifon transcribed each piece of music.

The soundtrack was released digitally and in two physical formats: a two-disc CD edition and a vinyl record edition, the latter of which was limited to 2000 units. The vinyl edition contains 16 tracks on two sides and comes with a code to download the rest of the Anniversary soundtrack digitally. The compact disc edition contains thirty-nine tracks and was released on November 15, 2011.

== Release ==
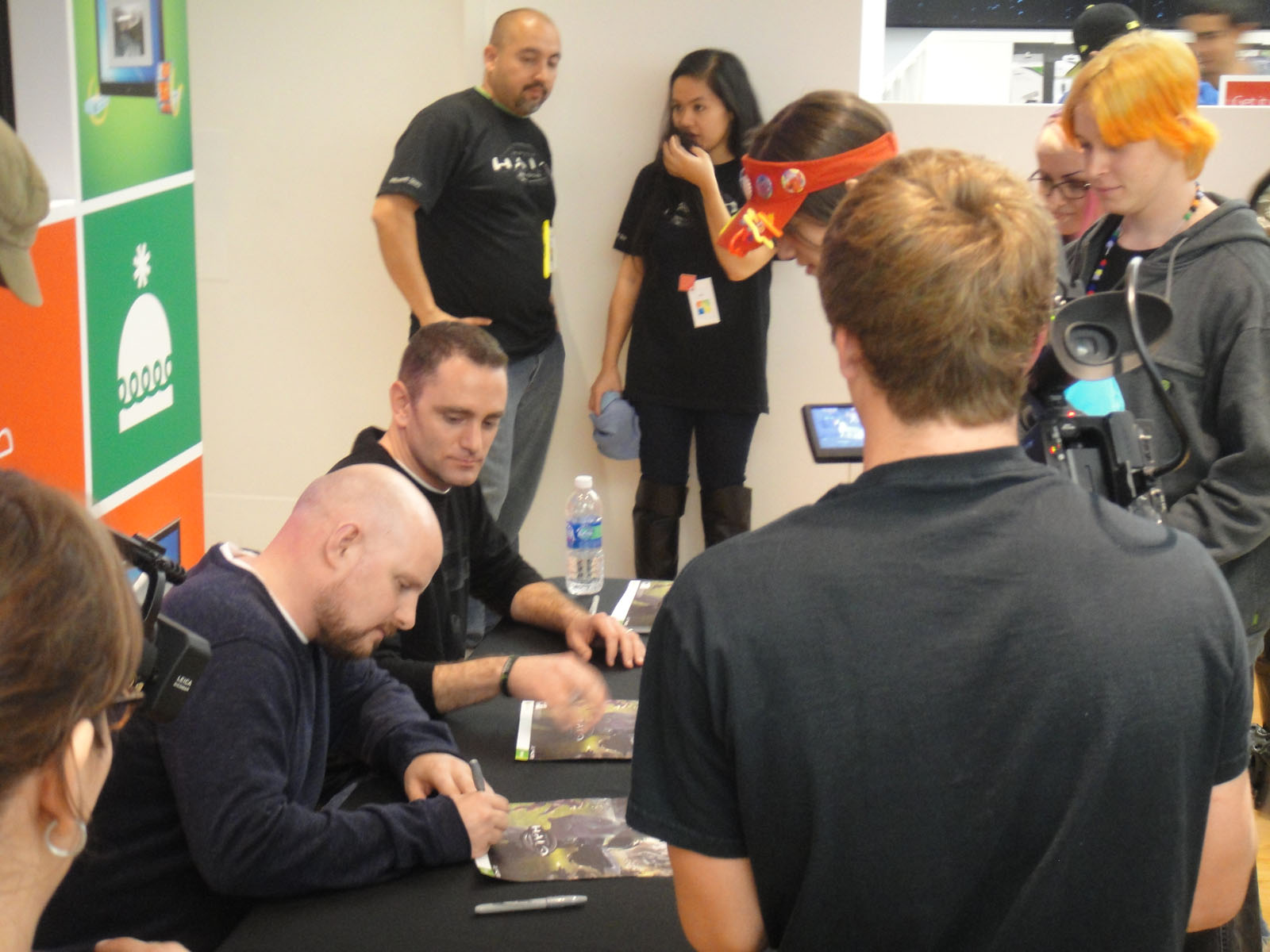
Frank O'Connor, Halo franchise director, signing posters at a Combat Evolved Anniversary launch event

Halo: Combat Evolved Anniversary was announced to the public with a trailer on June 6, 2011, at Microsoft's annual E3 global media briefing, which closed with the teaser trailer for Halo 4. Bonuses for preordering the game included a Master Chief Xbox 360 avatar costume and an exclusive Grunt Funeral skull, which toggles whether enemy Grunts (Unggoy) explode upon death. During the Halo Universe panel at the 2011 San Diego Comic-Con, a short trailer showcasing the animation used in the terminals with a narration by 343 Guilty Spark was shown to the fans. Microsoft launched the Halo Living Monument, consisting of a live-action short and a website, to celebrate the launch of Combat Evolved Anniversary.

Thirteen retail Microsoft Stores hosted launch events for Anniversary's November 15, 2011, midnight release; festivities included sixteen-player multiplayer matches, limited-edition giveaways, and appearances by the game developers. In the United Kingdom, Microsoft and the British video game retailer GAME held two pre-release events with the full version of the game and prizes. In another British promotion, those who purchased a special Halo-themed Pizza Hut pizza during a two-week promotional period surrounding the release date received two days of Xbox Live premium membership. VideoGamer.com's staff found the pizza to be delicious, but its connection to the Halo franchise tenuous. Microsoft and Pizza Hut would run a similar promotion the next year for Halo 4's release.

As stated by tracking firm Chart-Track, Anniversary was the sixth best-selling game of the week across all platforms in the UK; it attained the fifteenth spot in Japan according to Media Create, while according to Amazon orders, it was the second best-selling game for the 360 platform in the same period. It was the third best-selling Xbox 360 game in North America during its first week.

Halo: Combat Evolved Anniversary was released on the Xbox One as part of Halo: The Master Chief Collection on November 11, 2014, with support for 1080p60 rendering. A PC version of the game for Master Chief Collection was released on March 3, 2020.

== Reception ==
Reception

Aggregate scores
Aggregator	Score
GameRankings	82%
Metacritic	82/100

Review scores
Publication	Score
Destructoid	9/10
Electronic Gaming Monthly	8.5/10
Game Informer	8.5/10
GameSpot	8.0/10
Giant Bomb	4/5
IGN	8/10
Official Xbox Magazine (US)	8.5/10
PALGN	8/10
Digital Spy	4/5
The Escapist	4.5/5
The Guardian	4/5

Halo: Combat Evolved Anniversary received generally positive reviews. On aggregate review website Metacritic, the game has a weighted score of 82 out of 100, based on 73 reviews from critics. On GameRankings, the game has an overall score of 81.92% based on reviews from 53 critics. The staff of Official Xbox Magazine praised the developers for preserving the original gameplay, avoiding "revisionist horrors" and Star Wars re-release moments. Brandon Justice of Electronic Gaming Monthly wrote for fans of the series, "[Anniversary] is one of the best pieces of fan service our industry has ever produced, and you need to go buy it."

The remastered visuals were positively received; reviewers such as The Inquirer's Chris Martin and The Escapist's Russ Pitts singled out the graphics-switch button for praise. The Guardian's Steve Boxer called the feature "utterly fascinating—a bit like ... archaeology on your console", and said that the visual overhaul improved areas where the original game engine was weak, such as rendering outdoor environments. While praising most of the game's refinements, Watters singled out the Flood as enemies he thought the original game envisioned better, saying "the simplicity of the classic look feels more sinister and alien". Hamza Aziz of Destructoid appreciated the visual updates, but not some of the resulting audio–animation syncing issues.

Reviewers disagreed on how the core gameplay of Combat Evolved, unaltered in Anniversary, had aged over ten years. Writing for GameSpot, editor Chris Watters opined that "the fundamental mechanics of the game have ... endured well", with responsive controls and challenging enemies. PALGN writer Adam Guetti agreed, praising "rock solid" controls and tight gameplay, while Mike Wilcox of The Sydney Morning Herald argued the anniversary edition "[proves] a game with a winning formula doesn't wither with age". IGN's Steven Hopper, on the other hand, felt that the level design was dated, the repetitious environments making it easy for players to lose their bearings, and that vehicles handled poorly. Giant Bomb's Brad Shoemaker wrote that while the best aspects of the game remained, other aspects—such as the level design and fighting the Flood—were no less frustrating after ten years; Digital Spy's Matthew Reynolds echoed the sentiment, praising the game for presenting situations unsurpassed in later games while faulting irregular checkpoints.

Critics had split opinions on Anniversary's additional features. The stereoscopic 3D effect was alternately praised and dismissed: Matt Miller of Game Informer wrote that the feature "doesn't add anything to the experience", while Aziz described the feature as "fantastic", considering its use in Anniversary to be more subtle and pleasing than in other games. Aziz also applauded the narrative terminals, although he criticized the Kinect voice command support for being slower in combat than pressing buttons. Ben Kuchera of Ars Technica enjoyed the improvements of the Halo maps in Anniversary's multiplayer mode, but criticized the inability to play said mode via four-person local split screen as in the original game. Reynolds agreed with 343 Industries's choice to use Reach for Anniversary's multiplayer mode, writing that the map pack offered "a smart way of reintroducing players back into the game", as well as commending Halo's combat for offering an alternative to contemporary military shooters.
