= Halo: The Master Chief Collection =

Video game compilation

- Developer: 343 Industries (Note: Additional work by Saber Interactive, Certain Affinity, United Front Games and Blur Studio. Halo: Combat Evolved, Halo 2, Halo 3, Halo 3: ODST, and Halo: Reach were originally developed by Bungie. Ruffian Games and Splash Damage assisted with the development of the Windows release.)
- Publisher: Xbox Game Studios
- Series: Halo
- Engine: Saber3D Engine (Note: Single-player component of Halo: Combat Evolved Anniversary and Halo 2: Anniversary); Unreal Engine 4 (Note: Menu UI and player customization)
- Platforms: Xbox One (Note: Enhanced on Xbox Series X/S through backward-compatibility); Windows
- Release: Xbox One; November 11, 2014; Windows; December 3, 2019; Xbox Series X/S; November 17, 2020
- Genre: First-person shooter
- Modes: Single-player, multiplayer

Halo: The Master Chief Collection is a compilation of first-person shooter games developed by 343 Industries, Certain Affinity, Saber Interactive and Bungie and published by Xbox Game Studios. It includes the first six main games in the Halo franchise released between 2001 and 2012, originally developed by Bungie and 343 Industries. It was released for Xbox One on November 11, 2014.

At launch, the collection comprised Halo: Combat Evolved Anniversary (2011), Halo 2 (2004), Halo 3 (2007), and Halo 4 (2012) with their respective multiplayer suites, and boasting graphical and performance enhancements, including resolution and framerate improvements. Halo 2 was remastered as Halo 2 Anniversary, with new art, audio, a set of remade multiplayer maps, and new cinematic cutscenes produced by Blur Studio to commemorate the game's tenth anniversary. The single-player campaign of Halo 3: ODST (2009) was added in May 2015.

The Master Chief Collection was released for Windows between December 2019 and November 2020, coinciding with the additions of Halo: Reach (2010) and the Firefight multiplayer for Halo 3: ODST. The Xbox One version includes access to the live-action series Halo: Nightfall, and hosted the Halo 5: Guardians multiplayer beta on Xbox One that ran in 2014–15.

== Gameplay ==
The Master Chief Collection packages together the first-person shooters Halo: Combat Evolved Anniversary, Halo 2 Anniversary, Halo 3, Halo 3: ODST, Halo: Reach, and Halo 4. Each game features their campaign modes, multiplayer maps and game modes, in addition to including additional content that was added in further updates that is based from Halo Online, content based from earlier builds of the games such as from pre-release multiplayer betas, and cut content from the original games. There have been no story or gameplay changes to the original releases. The games are first-person shooters with vehicular combat that takes place from a third-person perspective. Each campaign has four difficulty levels and access to gameplay modifiers known as "Skulls".

All four campaign modes can be played alone or cooperatively via split screen or Xbox Live on Xbox One and Series consoles. The Microsoft Windows release does not have split screen capability, but it can be played cooperatively online with Steam friends and Xbox friends.

As in Combat Evolved Anniversary, Halo 2 players can swap between the original and remastered graphics on the fly. Additions to Halo 2's campaign mode include "Terminals", and new prologue and epilogue cutscenes to link the series for Halo 5's debut. Since only six of the game's multiplayer maps were remastered, there are two Halo 2 multiplayer modes. The Halo 2 anniversary multiplayer mode uses the six remastered maps, while the standard Halo 2 multiplayer mode includes all of the original game's released maps with a full graphical update but no remastering. The Collection multiplayer includes Mission Setlists, curated lists of levels selected from throughout the series.

The Extras menu includes access to live-action video series Halo: Nightfall via the Halo Channel and the Halo 5: Guardians multiplayer beta, until it was removed prior to the game's release (with the Xbox versions instead allowing players to launch directly into Halo 5 from the Master Chief Collection). The compilation features new Achievements, and all difficulty and game modes are unlocked from the start. The game launched with a total of 4,000 Gamerscore spread across 400 Achievements—the largest amount of Gamerscore given to a game on the Xbox platform since its introduction. The subsequent additions of Halo 3: ODST and Halo: Reach introduced 300 additional Achievements for both Xbox One and Windows, bringing the total Gamerscore up to 7,000. The Master Chief Collection held the record for the highest amount of Gamerscore on Xbox and PC until it was surpassed by The Elder Scrolls Online in 2025; Though it still holds the record for the most Achievements on Xbox at 700.

== Development ==
343 Industries studio head Bonnie Ross pushed for Halo 4 to be a launch title for the Xbox One, but it instead released in 2012 for the Xbox 360. The timing left a gap in the release schedule between Halo 4 and Halo 5. Having previously developed Halo: Combat Evolved Anniversary for Combat Evolved's tenth anniversary, the initial plan was to release a similar standalone Halo 2 Anniversary within the first few years of the new console's lifecycle. 343 Industries decided that it would be a great opportunity to release the other main Halo titles for the Xbox One in preparation for the 2015 release of Halo 5: Guardians.The collection was developed by 343 Industries, Certain Affinity, and Saber Interactive, with development assistance by United Front Games and new cutscenes by Blur Studio.

Combat Evolved Anniversary is based on the high-definition remaster of the original game released in 2011 for Xbox 360. Kinect and Stereoscopic 3D features from the Xbox 360 version are not supported in the Xbox One collection. Ruffian Games was responsible for developing the Halo 3 and Halo 4 ports which received only a simple lighting upgrade, and an increase in both frame rate and rendering resolution. 343 Industries designed the interfaces and online networking. United Front Games worked on the unified interface that works across all games. All of the games run at 60 frames per second and have received lighting upgrades; all but the Halo 2 remaster have a native resolution of 1080p. The game was gold, indicating it was being prepared for duplication and release.

Coinciding with the release of The Master Chief Collection, 343 Industries developed the Halo Channel, an application for the Xbox One and Windows. It is a successor to the Halo Waypoint app that was released on the Xbox 360. The Xbox One app is integrated with the collection, allowing players to access Halo: Nightfall and "Terminal" animations, unlock rewards for the game, and launch the games directly from the app.

=== Halo 2: Anniversary ===
A comparison of the original game's character models (top) and new character models (bottom)

Saber Interactive, which co-developed Combat Evolved Anniversary, assisted in the remaster of Halo 2's campaign. It received a complete visual overhaul. The game's soundtrack and sound effects, such as weapon audio, were updated as well. The refined Halo 2 cutscenes, as well as two new cutscenes created to complement the Halo 5: Guardians storyline, were produced by Blur Studio. They feature the same structure and timing of the originals, and motion capture was utilized for the animation.

"Terminals", a feature first introduced in Halo 3, were added to the Halo 2: Anniversary campaign. Their purpose was to create a "connective tissue" for stories within the Halo universe that explores the relationship between the different races within the Covenant and extensively covers the events portrayed in Halo 2. Terminals also gave 343 Industries the opportunity to introduce Spartan Locke, a main character in Halo 5: Guardians. Visual effect studio The Sequence Group collaborated with 343 Industries to provide the animation; the group had previously performed similar work in Combat Evolved Anniversary and Halo 4. Several voice actors reprised their roles including Keith David as the Arbiter, John DiMaggio as the Heretic Leader, and Tim Dadabo as 343 Guilty Spark. Mike Colter provided the voice-over for Spartan Locke.

Once the Halo 2: Anniversary project was green-lit, executive producer Dan Ayoub at 343 Industries reached out to Max Hoberman of Certain Affinity for assistance on the multiplayer component. Hoberman originally designed Halo 2's multiplayer and founded Certain Affinity after leaving Bungie in 2006. Certain Affinity was asked to remake several of the multiplayer maps from Halo 2. The team found it difficult to decide how many of the original 24 maps to redesign and eventually settled on six – two small, two medium, and two large – to provide some variation.

Along with the visual upgrade, Halo 2's original score was re-recorded with the San Francisco Symphony at Skywalker Sound studio. Guitarist Steve Vai returned to the franchise to play on additional tracks with Periphery guitarist Misha Mansoor. The Halo 2: Anniversary soundtrack was released on November 11, 2014.

== Release ==
On June 9, 2014, Halo: The Master Chief Collection was announced at the Electronic Entertainment Expo with a trailer titled "Hunter and the Hunted". The trailer was created by animation company Digital Domain, which had previously collaborated on other Halo commercials. The trailer recreates a moment from Halo 2, in which the Master Chief rides a bomb into a Covenant ship. It is narrated by Keith David, who voices the Arbiter. Several other trailers were released prior to launch, showcasing the updated cinematics and Terminals featured in Halo 2: Anniversary, and gameplay from all titles across the collection. On October 31, 2014, 343 Industries released a documentary, Remaking the Legend – Halo 2: Anniversary, chronicling the history of Halo 2 and the development of Halo 2: Anniversary; it also features interviews with developers at Bungie and 343 Industries. The documentary was initially broadcast on Twitch, and was later available on the Halo Channel, Xbox Video, and YouTube.

In August 2014, UK retailer Game revealed two special editions of The Master Chief Collection. The "Limited" edition includes a steel book case, a map book, and an in-game modifier, while the "Mjolnir" edition includes all the content from the Limited edition, along with a 1-foot (0.30 m) statue of the Master Chief. In October 2014, Microsoft announced a white Master Chief Collection Xbox One bundle for Brazil and other "select markets". A second Xbox One bundle containing the collection was announced for release in the United States during March 2015.

The collection was released worldwide in November 2014. 343 Industries confirmed that the collection would be available to download from the Xbox Games Store on the day of release. A 15-gigabyte patch went live to those who had digitally preordered it through the Xbox Games Store on November 6, 2014. Players who preordered through the Xbox Games Store also received early access to the "Boom" Skull, which provides double the explosion physics in the Halo: Combat Evolved and Halo 2 campaign mode; it became available to all other users on December 12, 2014.

== Post-release ==
At launch, many players experienced problems with online matchmaking modes. 343 Industries released numerous updates to address these issues. On November 24, 2014, Bonnie Ross, head of 343 Industries, issued a public apology noting issues "that have resulted in a frustrating experience, including long matchmaking times and low session success rates". On December 19, 2014, Microsoft announced that as an apology for the issues, it would give a free month of Xbox Live Gold, a special avatar and nameplate, and a free downloadable copy of the Halo 3: ODST campaign to those who played the game between its launch and December 19, 2014. The campaign mode of ODST was released to the public on May 30, 2015, and with it, 100 additional Achievements. It is available to purchase separately to those who are not eligible for a free code for the add-on.

Spartan Ops, the episodic content originating in Halo 4, was released as free downloadable content for The Master Chief Collection on December 22, 2014. Additional Achievements for Spartan Ops and the multiplayer mode were released on January 8, 2015.

Halo: Nightfall—a series of weekly, episodic digital videos directed by Sergio Mimica-Gezzan and produced by Ridley Scott—launched soon after the collection was released. The series was designed to connect the stories of previous Halo games to the upcoming Halo 5. The Halo 5 beta launched on December 29, 2014, and ran until January 18, 2015.

With the release of The Master Chief Collection, Microsoft and 343 Industries announced an official esports league, the Halo Championship Series (HCS). 343 Industries partnered with the Electronic Sports League, live-streaming platform Twitch, and other tournament organisers to foster the competitive multiplayer community in Halo. The first season of HCS, featuring Halo 2: Anniversary's multiplayer, launched in November 2014 and ran until March 2015. It served as a test bed for ideas and future plans that 343 Industries had for esports in Halo 5.

In April 2018, the MCC Insider Program was launched to playtest upcoming changes to The Master Chief Collection, notably the various improvements to its interface and to its multiplayer modes. As a part of the various changes, 343 Industries introduced patches to bring back well-known Halo 2 glitches from the original Xbox version, such as sword flying in the campaign. This led to an increased interest in speedrunning the game on the MCC version. On August 27, 2018, the changes were published for all players.

In August 2020, 343 Industries announced that Xbox-PC crossplay will be made available by the end of 2020, based upon input-based matchmaking. The crossplay option was made available with the release of final game in the collection on November 17, 2020.

=== Windows release ===
On March 12, 2019, following a series of teases, Xbox Game Studios announced on the Inside Xbox live stream that The Master Chief Collection would be coming to Windows via the Steam digital distribution platform in addition to the Microsoft Store. Splash Damage and Ruffian Games aided 343 Industries in the development of the port. Xbox Game Studios rolled out the individual games in the collection as separate add-ons, starting with Halo: Reach and then proceeding chronologically from Combat Evolved Anniversary. Upon this announcement, 343 Industries' offices in Redmond, Washington, were overwhelmed by pizza delivery orders from anonymous users, particularly from Reddit.

Halo: Reach was launched on Steam and Microsoft Store on December 3, 2019 alongside the Xbox One version, as the first game distributed to PC players as part of The Master Chief Collection, but subsequent titles became available over the following year. 343 Industries had set out to have the collection playable on PC before the launch of Halo Infinite in 2021. The final game to release on PC was Halo 4, launching on November 17, 2020. The PC version of the collection was simultaneously made available on PC Game Pass with the option to install the whole release, or individual titles through the subscription.

Windows releases
Title	Release date
Halo: Reach	December 3, 2019
Halo: Combat Evolved Anniversary	March 3, 2020
Halo 2: Anniversary	May 12, 2020
Halo 3	July 14, 2020
Halo 3: ODST	September 22, 2020
Halo 4	November 17, 2020 (Note: Was released in some time zones on November 16, 2020, a few hours before the official date.)

=== Xbox Series X|S enhancements ===
The Xbox One version of the collection received an update enhancing the game for Xbox Series X|S consoles on November 17, 2020. It features various graphical and gameplay improvements, including some features introduced with the PC release, such as the variable field of view and running at 120 FPS in both single player and multiplayer modes, with support for 4K resolution on Xbox Series X.

== Reception ==
Reception

Aggregate score
Aggregator	Score
Metacritic	85/100

Review scores
Publication	Score
Destructoid	9/10
Eurogamer	9/10
Game Informer	9.25/10
GameRevolution	8/10
GameSpot	6/10
IGN	9/10 (Xbox One); 9.5/10 (PC)
Polygon	8/10
Shacknews	8/10
USgamer	4.5/5
VideoGamer.com	8/10
Trusted Reviews	9/10

Halo: The Master Chief Collection received generally positive reviews. Aggregating review website Metacritic gave it a score 85 out of 100 based on reviews from 69 critics. Reviews praised the graphics, frame rate, and content included in the bundle, but criticized the matchmaking problems that prevented players from playing online multiplayer modes on release day.

The technical problems affected the online experience. Forbes' Paul Tassi wrote the game on release "was just flat out broken", and though improvements have been made, it "may very well be the worst major game release in a decade". Stuart Andrews of Trusted Reviews commented that "Halo 3 looks and feels surprisingly dated" when compared to the rest of the collection, particularly Halo 2 and Halo 4.

Following a series of cryptic pizza-themed teasers and the announcement of Halo: Reach being added to Halo: The Master Chief Collection and the announcement of the game coming to PC, 343 Industries was sent pizzas from fans as a token of appreciation. Brian "Ske7ch" Jarrard, community director at 343 Industries, eventually pleaded fans to stop sending pizzas, as the number of pizzas being delivered was becoming overwhelming.
