= Halo Studios =

American video game developer

- Formerly: 343 Industries (2007–2024)
- Type: Division
- Industry: Video games
- Founded: 2007; 19 years ago
- Founder: Bonnie Ross
- Headquarters: Redmond, Washington, US
- Key people: Pierre Hintze (studio head)
- Products: Halo series
- Parent: Xbox Game Studios
- Website: Official website

Halo Studios is an American video game developer based in Redmond, Washington, part of Xbox Game Studios. Headed by Pierre Hintze, the studio is responsible for the Halo science fiction franchise, and developed main Halo titles internally between 2011 and 2026, while also overseeing collaborative games with external developers and all related ancillary media. The studio was formed in 2007 as 343 Industries, named for the character 343 Guilty Spark, to oversee the franchise after original Halo developer Bungie regained its independence from Microsoft.

After co-developing downloadable content for Halo: Reach, Bungie's final Halo game, 343 Industries released a remaster of Halo: Combat Evolved, Halo: Combat Evolved Anniversary in 2011. Their first new game, Halo 4 released in 2012, and was followed by Halo 5: Guardians in 2015 and Halo Infinite in 2021; 343 Industries also collaborated with other studios to release spin-offs and compilations. The studio rebranded in October 2024 to Halo Studios, releasing Halo: Campaign Evolved in 2026. Shortly afterwards, much of the studio's staff was laid off as both the Halo IP and development of the next main entry was transferred to Activision.

== History ==
=== Formation and early projects ===
Bungie was a video game developer working on their next project when they were acquired by Microsoft in 2000. Their in-development game, Halo: Combat Evolved, turned into a launch title for Microsoft's Xbox console. Bungie and Microsoft's cultures never meshed, and after the release of Halo 2 Bungie began renegotiating for better profit sharing for their next game, Halo 3. These discussions led to Bungie announcing its independence from Microsoft in 2007. While Bungie was still contracted to deliver new Halo games, the rights to the franchise remained with Microsoft. Xbox general manager Bonnie Ross recalled that her colleagues felt Halo was a waning property and looked at contracting an outside company to produce new games; the series's deep backstory and universe appealed to Ross, and she argued for a different approach. Ross' pitch won over Microsoft Game Studios general manager Shane Kim, and she was put in charge of a new internal Halo studio, 343 Industries, named after the Halo character 343 Guilty Spark.

343 Industries started with a staff of roughly a dozen people in late 2007. Bungie staffer Frank O'Connor assisted in the transition, and left Bungie to serve as 343 Industries' franchise director. Ross' vision for Halo also impressed Microsoft art director Kiki Wolfkill, who joined the team as a studio head. During the transition, 343 Industries worked with the company Starlight Runner to compile a centralized story bible for the universe.

Logo for 343 Industries

In July 2009, 343 Industries announced it was working on a seven-part Halo anime series called Halo Legends. Later that year the studio created Halo Waypoint, a downloadable application that tracks a user's Halo accomplishments. 343 Industries also increased staff for Halo development, recruiting staff from the defunct Pandemic Studios. 343 Industries also collaborated with Certain Affinity on Halo: Reach's map packs. Wanting to mark the occasion of Halo: Combat Evolved's tenth anniversary, 343 Industries contracted Saber Interactive to develop Halo: Combat Evolved Anniversary, which released on November 15, 2011.

=== Reclaimer saga ===
Following Bungie's completion of their last Halo title, Halo: Reach, 343 Industries was eventually given complete control of the Halo franchise including servers and data on March 31, 2012. The studio's development of Halo 4, which began in 2009, was completed in September. It was released on November 6, 2012, as the first title of a new Halo Reclaimer Trilogy which would include at least two more installments over the years. At E3 2013, Microsoft and 343 Industries announced the next "Halo" installment set for release on the Xbox One. Shortly after the announcement, the Reclaimer Trilogy was confirmed by Microsoft Studios corporate vice-president Phil Spencer to be expanded into a Reclaimer Saga. The following year at E3 2014, the official title was revealed as "Halo 5: Guardians" along with plans for its release on October 27, 2015. Microsoft, in a contract with Mega Bloks, is in conjunction with 343 Industries to manufacture a new line of toys and other memorabilia for the upcoming Halo saga. Halo 5: Guardians was released on October 27, 2015, with semi-exclusive content to those who purchased select Mega Bloks sets. 343 Industries released free monthly content updates since Halo 5's launch.

At E3 2018, Microsoft Studios and 343 Industries announced the next Halo game, titled Halo Infinite, which was originally scheduled to launch in holiday 2020 for Xbox One and Windows PCs, in addition to being a launch title for the next Xbox console, the Xbox Series X. However, the game was delayed to release in 2021, in part due to the COVID-19 pandemic forcing the 343 staff to switch to remote work. Infinite was developed using 343's in-house Slipspace Engine.

=== Rebranding and last projects ===
After Infinite's release, 343 Industries supported the game via updates. On September 12, 2022, Bonnie Ross announced she would step down as studio head. Following her departure, her responsibilities were split into three positions. Pierre Hintze took over as studio head, Bryan Koski became GM of the franchise and Elizabeth Van Wyck took over business and operations. Amid wider layoffs in the tech industry and Microsoft, 343 Industries was heavily affected, and Bloomberg News reported the studio would be making large changes to its development structure going forward.

In October 2024, 343 Industries announced a rebrand as Halo Studios, amid a shift to Unreal Engine 5 for future project development, moving away from Slipspace Engine. A Halo Waypoint blog post in early July 2025 confirmed that Halo Studios would reveal details on their first project in Unreal Engine 5 during that October's Halo World Championships. The studio was subject to internal layoffs coinciding with Microsoft's business reorganizations later that month, with an anonymous former employee interviewed by Engadget citing "tension" that had been arising within the developer regarding unspecified projects that were "recently in crisis." The individual also spoke of Microsoft pivoting Halo development towards collaborating with contracted studios across the United States and Europe, as opposed to individual contractors as 343 Industries relied on, mirroring the development pipelines for other first-person-shooter titles like Call of Duty and Battlefield. Additional personnel were laid off of the studio in 2025 amid wider Microsoft layoffs, with sources reporting to Engadget dissatisfaction and tension at the studio.

Following the release of Halo: Campaign Evolved and continuing Microsoft reorganization of its gaming studios, Xbox chief content officer Matt Booty announced in September 2026 that the next Halo title would be developed by Activision, which was reported to be a mainline installment by The Hollywood Reporter. Halo Studios had the majority of its staff laid off, with the remaining team being restructured to support existing titles. The Verge writer Tom Warren reported that the decision to transfer Halo development to Activision was made as Halo Studios' next mainline game was still expected to be years away from launch. The following month, franchise writer Alan Wakeford confirmed that Halo Studios had intended to oversee the completion and releases of Halo media projects that were in development prior to the franchise's transition to Activision, including the novel Halo: Fireteam Noble by Troy Denning, and the novella Halo: Burn The Road Home by Kenneth Peters.

== Games overseen ==
=== As 343 Industries ===
| Year | Game | Platform(s) | Notes |
|---|---|---|---|
| 2011 | Halo: Combat Evolved Anniversary | Xbox 360 | Collaboration with Saber Interactive and Certain Affinity |
| 2012 | Halo 4 | Xbox 360 | Collaboration with Certain Affinity |
| 2013 | Halo: Spartan Assault | iOS, Microsoft Windows, Windows Phone, Xbox 360, Xbox One | Collaboration with Vanguard Games |
| 2014 | Halo: The Master Chief Collection | Xbox One, Microsoft Windows, Xbox Series X/S | Halo 2 Anniversary developed in collaboration with Saber Interactive, Certain Affinity and Blur Studio; Windows port in collaboration with Splash Damage and Ruffian Games |
| 2015 | Halo: Spartan Strike | iOS, Microsoft Windows, Windows Phone | Collaboration with Vanguard Games |
| 2015 | Halo 5: Guardians | Xbox One | Part of the game's features were released on Windows as Halo 5: Forge |
| 2016 | Halo Wars: Definitive Edition | Microsoft Windows, Xbox One | Collaboration with Behaviour Interactive |
| 2017 | Halo Wars 2 | Microsoft Windows, Xbox One | Collaboration with Creative Assembly |
| 2017 | Halo Recruit | Microsoft Windows | Collaboration with Endeavor One |
| 2018 | Halo: Fireteam Raven | Arcade | Collaboration with Play Mechanix and Raw Thrills |
| 2021 | Halo Infinite | Microsoft Windows, Xbox One, Xbox Series X/S | Collaboration with SkyBox Labs, Sperasoft, The Coalition and Certain Affinity |

=== As Halo Studios ===
| Year | Game | Platform(s) | Notes |
|---|---|---|---|
| 2026 | Halo: Campaign Evolved | Microsoft Windows, Xbox Series X/S, PlayStation 5 | Remake of Halo: Combat Evolved's single-player campaign |
