= Halo Legends =

2010 adult animated anthology film by Frank O'Connor and Joseph Chou

- Special edition DVD/Blu-ray Disc cover
- Directed by: Frank O'Connor; Joseph Chou
- Produced by: Bonnie Ross; John Ledford; Joseph Chou
- Production companies: Studio 4°C; Production I.G; Casio Entertainment; Toei Animation; Bones; Bee Train; Warner Bros.; 343 Industries
- Distributed by: Warner Home Video
- Release date: February 16, 2010
- Running time: 111 minutes
- Countries: Japan; Germany; United States
- Languages: English; Japanese
- Box office: $11 million (US DVD sales)

Halo Legends is a 2010 adult animated military science fiction anthology film produced by 343 Industries. The anime compiles seven animated short films, detailing the backstory of the Halo universe, in addition to providing side stories that expand the universe and tie into the film series. The animations were created by six Japanese anime production houses: Bee Train, Bones, Casio Entertainment, Production I.G., Studio 4°C, and Toei Animation. Shinji Aramaki, creator and director of Appleseed and Appleseed Ex Machina, serves as the project's creative advisor.

The idea for an anime compilation existed for years before there was momentum for the project. 343 creative director Frank O'Connor produced story outlines or finished scripts that the production houses animated in a variety of styles. Warner Bros. released Legends on DVD and Blu-ray Disc on February 16, 2010. Critical reception was generally positive, and the anthology grossed more than $11 million in home video sales.

== Development ==
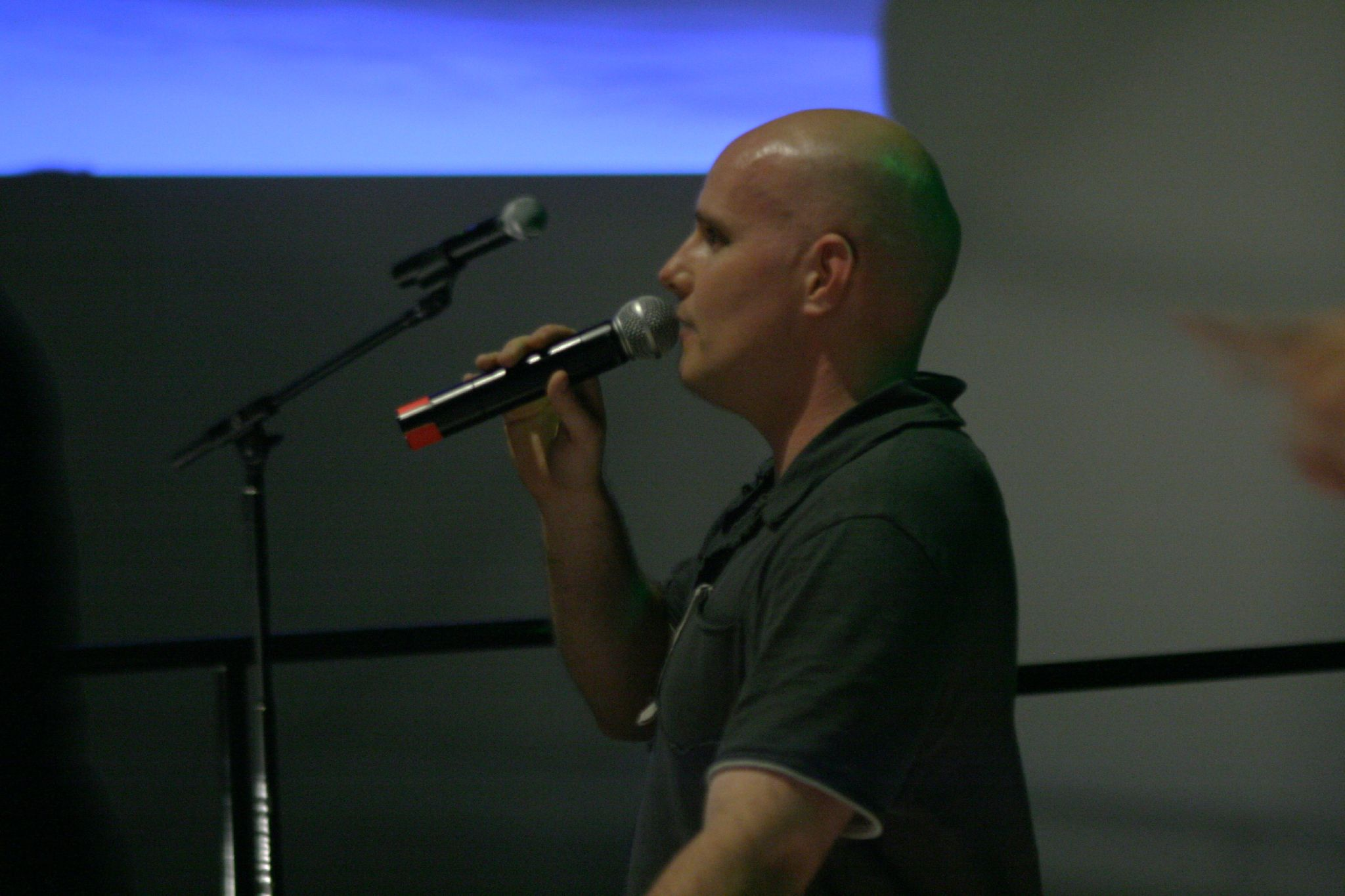
Frank O'Connor, Franchise Development Director at 343i, was heavily involved in developing the stories that appear in Legends.

To oversee development of the entire Halo franchise, Microsoft created an internal division, 343 Industries, to manage the Halo brand. Frank O'Connor, 343's creative director, said that such a move was vital: "If you look at how George Lucas held on to Star Wars, not just to make money from action figures but to control the direction the universe went in, you can see why we think it's pretty vital."

Halo Legends had origins in the 2006 Marvel Comics tie-in, The Halo Graphic Novel; O'Connor said that the idea of an anime compilation existed for years before there was momentum for the project. Wanting to tell smaller stories in a different format than video games and novels and in different art styles, O'Connor said that anime was a natural fit. An additional consideration was that 343 Industries felt that the Japanese style of narrative fit the stories well. Most of the animation studios Microsoft approached were available for the project. Most studios were "afraid" of creating their own stories, even if they were familiar with the series, so O'Connor sent them possible story treatments. Microsoft was deeply involved in making sure story details were correct and writing the scripts for the stories—O'Connor estimated that 50% of the dialogue in the final products were verbatim from the original scripts. While all the stories save one are considered canon, O'Connor noted that some discrepancies were the cause of artistic interpretation.

The animation studios were given wide latitude in their presentation. "We realized very early on [that Halo] could take interpretation," said O'Connor, saying that the look-and-feel of the universe persisted even through differing artistic styles. In developing their stories and styles, the anime studios were supplied with access to Halo's story bible and art assets.

One of the artistic styles that is the most radical departure from traditional animation styles is in "The Duel", which employs a filter that makes every cell look as though it was hand painted by watercolors. Director Hiroshi Yamazaki's goal that he was aiming for in this project was, "to make audiences understand there should be other styles of animation beyond the existing two primary kinds of animation presented—precisely cel-drawing 2D style and CG 3D style. I wanted to show that creators are not limited, that they have many options for different (animation) styles to create stories."

Voice recording for the English dub was done by Seraphim Digital in Houston, Texas.

== Episodes ==
Several episodes were originally broadcast on Halo Waypoint on the specified date. The episodes range in length from ten to twenty minutes.

Title	Studio	Waypoint airdate
"The Babysitter"	Studio 4°C	November 7, 2009
"The Babysitter" follows a team of four Orbital Drop Shock Troopers, or Helljumpers. The team is composed of Private O'Brien, Master Sergeant Cortez, Corporal Taylor Miles (Dutch) and Corporal Checkman. O'Brien is being replaced as the team's sniper by Cal-141, a SPARTAN-II, and is now the backup. The team is sent into a Covenant zone under the cover of a meteor shower to eliminate a Prophet. Checkman's pod burns up during entry, and O'Brien's lands in a swamp. Cal rescues the pod, but O'Brien isn't grateful. During the trek to the perch, the group encounter a village and Cal records the findings. O'Brien then tries to assassinate a grunt, but is attacked by a brute. Cal fights the brute and throws it over a waterfall, then rescues O'Brien who is nearly killed again. However O'Brien is still angry at being seconded. At the perch on the mountain, Cal lines up to take the shot, but the group is attacked when the brute returns. The ODSTs kill the brute, but find Cal severely injured. Cortez takes off the helmet to find Cal is female, and O'Brien is forced to take the shot, killing the prophet. Cal dies from her injuries, but gives Cortez the data on the village. Later, O'Brien laments on how he let his ego and pride rule him, and how he never thanked Cal for saving his life. Produced by Eiko Tanaka and directed by Toshiyuki Kanno.
"The Duel"	Production I.G	November 21, 2009
"The Duel" was produced by Mitsuhisa Ishikawa and directed by Hiroshi Yamazaki, with creative supervision by Mamoru Oshii. The story follows an Arbiter who does not want to follow the Covenant religion. One of the Prophets accuses Fal of heresy. Fal will not yield and the Prophet sends another Elite to kill his wife in order to drag him to a trap.
"The Package"	Casio Entertainment	December 5, 2009
"The Package"	Casio Entertainment	December 12, 2009
On board a cloaked human ship, a group of elite supersoldiers called Spartans (John-117/Master Chief, Frederic-104, Kelly-087, Arthur-079 and Solomon-069) are briefed by an intelligence officer about their mission. A Covenant fleet is momentarily trapped in the system, and is carrying an important "package" the Spartans must retrieve. The ship decloaks and deploys the Spartans in small ships called Booster Frames. Solomon detects the package on one of the ships, but discovers too late that it is a ruse; Solomon is killed when the ship is destroyed. Master Chief deduces that their target is actually in the Covenant flagship. Arthur is killed trying to cover Kelly during the battle, and the rest of the Spartans board the Covenant ship. Making their way through thick Covenant defenses, Master Chief manages to recover the package—human scientist Catherine Halsey in cryonic hibernation—and the two escape via a Covenant escape pod. The remaining Spartans are recovered by the stealth ship and leave the system.
"Origins"	Studio 4°C	January 1, 2010
On board the ship Forward Unto Dawn, the artificial intelligence Cortana and Master Chief are stranded after the events of Halo 3. Cortana muses on her existence and what she has learned about the noble and ancient race known as the Forerunners. Cortana narrates past events: thousands of years ago, the Forerunners were a great civilization, but they came under attack by the parasitic Flood. The Forerunners underestimated the Flood, by which time it had spread, gaining the knowledge of the life it consumed. Though the Forerunners fought bravely, they eventually realized it was a futile fight. After trying other methods, they developed a weapon of last resort; an array of ringed megastructures called Halos that would destroy the Flood and their food supply—every sentient creature in the galaxy. While the Flood and Forerunner were wiped out by the Halo Array's activation, the Forerunners reseeded catalogued life throughout the galaxy. The second part of "Origins" follows the rise of human civilization. Humanity's exploration and colonization of other worlds coincides with the rise of the Covenant, a theocratic alliance of alien races that worship the Forerunners and reverse-engineer their technology. The Covenant launches a massive war of extermination against the human race. The events of Halo: Combat Evolved, Halo 2 and Halo 3 are summarized; a band of Covenant Elites ally with humanity to stop the Flood from spreading into the galaxy again, and the long war ends between human and Covenant. In the present, Cortana cryptically warns that the Halos are only one of the galaxy's many secrets. "Origins" was a chance to tell the story of the entire Halo universe in a clear fashion; many parts of the franchise had only been explored in what O'Connor called a "piecemeal" fashion.
"Homecoming"	Bee Train	Unaired on Waypoint
Produced by Bee Train, executive produced by Koichi Mashimo, written by Hiroyuki Kawasaki and directed Koji Sawai. On Harvest, UNSC forces are pinned down by Covenant. A Spartan codenamed Daisy-023 arrives and helps evacuate the UNSC forces. While in battle, Daisy has flashbacks to her past in the SPARTAN-II supersoldier project. When she decides to escape the project and return home, she finds a replacement clone of herself. Daisy draws her firearm, but cannot kill the clone and decides to return to the military. The clone gives Daisy a small teddy bear, similar to what Daisy had before she was inducted into the SPARTAN-II Project. In the present, Daisy is shot and killed; her body is found by the Master Chief, who picks up the teddy bear beside her and places it in her hands.
"Prototype"	Bones	Unaired on Waypoint
A marine sergeant nicknamed Ghost and his demolition team are sent to destroy a prototype weapons facility to prevent it from falling into Covenant hands. Not wanting a repeat of his last mission, in which his entire platoon was killed, Ghost commandeers the heavy armor suit and uses it to provide cover for his squad as they evacuate. While Ghost deals massive damage to the Covenant forces, he is heavily outmatched and seriously wounded. As the last evacuation ships fly away, he uses the suit's self-destruct to destroy the nearby Covenant and complete his mission. Animated by Studio Bones, Directed by Tomoki Kyoda and Yasushi Muraki, featuring production designs by Shinji Aramaki.
"Odd One Out"	Toei Animation	N/A
Animated by Toei Animation Company written and directed by Daisuke Nishio, Odd One Out is a parody of the Halo universe and is not canon. It follows the adventures of Spartan 1337, a member of Master Chief's unit who suffers both from a severe ego and horrendous bad luck, although still a fairly competent fighter in his own right. He finds himself accidentally stranded on a planet after falling out of his transport. The planet is inhabited by dinosaurs and a group of stranded kids, the two oldest having superhuman strength. The Covenant test their latest weapon, a bestial warrior called Pluton. 1337 and the kids fight back, but are overpowered. However, the kids' ship (whose AI they refer to as "Mama") launches the beast into slipspace. When Cortana senses it, she tells Master Chief to leave it, as it is happy. 1337 makes for the rendezvous point, before being carried off by a pterodactyl.

The DVD released in 2010 has another episode sequence.

1. Origins I
2. Origins II
3. The Duel
4. Homecoming
5. Odd One Out
6. Prototype
7. The Babysitter
8. The Package

== Release and reception ==
Halo Legends was originally to be released on February 9, but launch was pushed back a week to February 16. The compilation comes in three different retail packages: a standard DVD release with all the episodes, a two-disc special-edition which contains additional commentary, and the Blu-ray Disc edition, featuring the special-edition features and a summary of the Halo storyline. The film's United States premiere was held at the AMC Metreon in San Francisco on February 10, with the companion soundtrack released by Sumthing Distribution the day previous.

Reception to Legends was mostly positive. Orlando Parfit of IGN UK wrote that while the decision to merge Halo and Japanese anime seemed an odd choice, "Halo Legends proves a successful—if uneven—attempt to fuse these two universes, and will certainly prove essential viewing for those with more than a passing interest in Bungie's seminal shooters." IGN US reviewers Cindy White and Christopher Monfette said that the short films "prove surprisingly accessible to sci-fi fans in general," and that the collection was "well worth" the time. Matt Miller of Game Informer said that Halo Legends would appeal to story-interested fans of the franchise, not those who cared about multiplayer gameplay.

Based on Rentrak and Home Media Magazine numbers, Legends ranked second and fourth in Blu-ray Disc and DVD sales, respectively, during its first week of sales in the United States. It also ranked seventh in Blu-ray Disc rankings in Japan. In its second week it dropped off the US Blu-ray Disc Top 20 charts, and slipped to tenth for DVD sales. According to The-Numbers.com, Legends sold $2.56 million worth of merchandise or 168,000 DVDs its first week. Sales later reached $8.32 million, selling almost 600,000 units. As of 2018, DVD sales have grossed $11 million in the United States.

== Soundtrack ==
The soundtrack was composed by various artists, such as Tetsuya Takahashi and Yasuharu Takanashi. Although the soundtrack contains mostly remixes of original work by Martin O'Donnell and Michael Salvatori, it also has some original material of its own.

No.	Title	Length
1.	"Ghosts of Reach"	1:22
2.	"Brothers in Arms"	1:41
3.	"Truth and Reconciliation"	5:57
4.	"Opening Suite 1"	0:58
5.	"Opening Suite 2"	2:26
6.	"Halo"	2:21
7.	"Desperate Measures"	1:56
8.	"Cairo Suite 1"	2:09
9.	"Delta Halo Suite"	5:19
10.	"Machines and Might"	1:01
11.	"Remembrance"	1:12
12.	"Blade and Burden"	1:06
13.	"Steel and Light"	1:15
14.	"Impend"	0:50
15.	"True Arbiter"	2:42
16.	"The Maw"	1:08
17.	"Unforgotten"	2:38
18.	"Shattered Legacy"	0:59
19.	"Out of Darkness"	1:10
20.	"High Charity Suite 2"	2:33
21.	"Into Light"	0:35
22.	"Sacred Icon Suite 2"	1:42
23.	"Rescue Mission"	1:16
24.	"The Last Spartan"	2:26
25.	"High Charity Quartet"	0:59
26.	"Here in Peril"	1:09
27.	"Earth City"	3:25
28.	"Risk and Reward"	0:49
29.	"Exit Window"	2:29
30.	"Finale 2"	1:20
