= Halo 4: Forward Unto Dawn =

2012 film by Stewart Hendler

- Visual ID poster with characters from left: Sullivan, Orenski, Master Chief, Lasky, Silva
- Genre: Action; Military sci-fi
- Written by: Aaron Helbing; Todd Helbing
- Directed by: Stewart Hendler
- Starring: Thom Green; Anna Popplewell; Enisha Brewster; Osric Chau; Kat de Lieva; Daniel Cudmore; Mike Dopud; Masam Holden; Ayelet Zurer; Iain Belcher
- Composers: Neil Davidge; Nathan Lanier
- Country of origin: United States
- Original language: English
- No. of episodes: 5

Production
- Executive producers: Josh Feldman; Lydia Antonini
- Cinematography: Brett Pawlak
- Editor: Michael Louis Hill
- Running time: 15 minutes
- Production companies: Microsoft Studios; 343 Industries; Herzog and Company; Legacy Effects; Arc Productions; Blacklist

Original release
- Network: YouTube
- Release: October 5 – November 2, 2012

Halo 4: Forward Unto Dawn is a military science fiction web series set in the universe of the Halo franchise. Forward Unto Dawn consists of five 15-minute episodes released weekly starting on October 5, 2012, and was later released as a single film on DVD and Blu-ray and was later put on Netflix in 2013. A coming-of-age story in the twenty-sixth century set 31 years before the events of Halo 4, Forward Unto Dawn follows Thomas Lasky, a cadet at a military training academy who is unsure of his future within the military but feels pressured to follow in the footsteps of his mother and brother. The academy is attacked by the Covenant, a religious alliance of aliens. Lasky and his surviving squad mates are rescued by the Master Chief and must escape the planet.

The series was produced as a marketing effort for the video game Halo 4 intended to widen the audience of the Halo series and as a stepping stone to a potential Halo film. It was written by Aaron Helbing and Todd Helbing, and directed by Stewart Hendler. Forward Unto Dawn was shot in Vancouver over 25 days in May 2012 on a budget just under US$10 million. It has just under 500 shots with computer-generated imagery, approximately a quarter of what a feature film would have, but the visual effects received praise from reviewers.

Forward Unto Dawn received a Streamy Award, and several of the crew received awards for their work editing, producing, and filming it. The series also won a Motion Picture Sound Editors Golden Reel Award for sound editing. Reviewers were impressed by the special effects and action-packed second act, but found that the plot was too slow in the first half and most of the characters were under-developed. The series was also nominated for a Primetime Emmy Award for main title design.

== Development ==
After the success of previous live-action promotional shorts, Landfall and The Life, 343 Industries, the studio in charge of development for the Halo franchise, wanted to use a live action series to appeal to an audience of people unfamiliar with the Halo games. The director of franchise business management at 343 Industries, Matt McClosky, explained the intended audience by saying that, "You see something that looks like a video game, you're going to get the same crowd you always get." The live-action format was also chosen for its ability to better develop characters; the series is used to introduce the character Thomas Lasky to the Halo universe before his role in the video game Halo 4. The developers wanted a protagonist with more emotion than Master Chief (whose face is never seen), to not only convey an understanding of the universe, but to better engage unfamiliar viewers.

Microsoft considers the series "the next step" between advertising material and a full-length film after the failure of a previous effort and aimed to produce a stand-alone series that could be enjoyed without necessarily playing the games. The budget for the series was almost USD $10 million, Microsoft's largest investment in a live-action promotion. Director Stewart Hendler said, "We're either the best-funded web series of all time, a sort of mid-road healthy TV pilot, or a super-low-budget movie." When the idea of directing a video game based web series was pitched to Hendler he declined, saying he was not interested in video game adaptions unless the subject was Halo. Hendler was already a fan of the series, having read the novels and played the games.

Potential writers were interviewed by 343 Industries, and some were selected to write a draft of a script. Aaron and Todd Helbing wrote a pitch set on Harvest, the first planet to be attacked by the Covenant (see Halo: Contact Harvest). Although 343 Industries decided not to use it, the Helbing brothers' script was the most complete and demonstrated the best understanding of the Halo universe so they were chosen to write Forward Unto Dawn. The final plot was developed by 343 Industries, Frank O'Connor, and the Helbings with the intention of introducing a new character to tie into Halo 4, which their Harvest script did not, and to explore "the least-well-known part of the Halo universe". In addition to providing input on the script, 343 Industries had a representative on set at all times to ensure that the series did not break canon.

=== Shooting and special effects ===
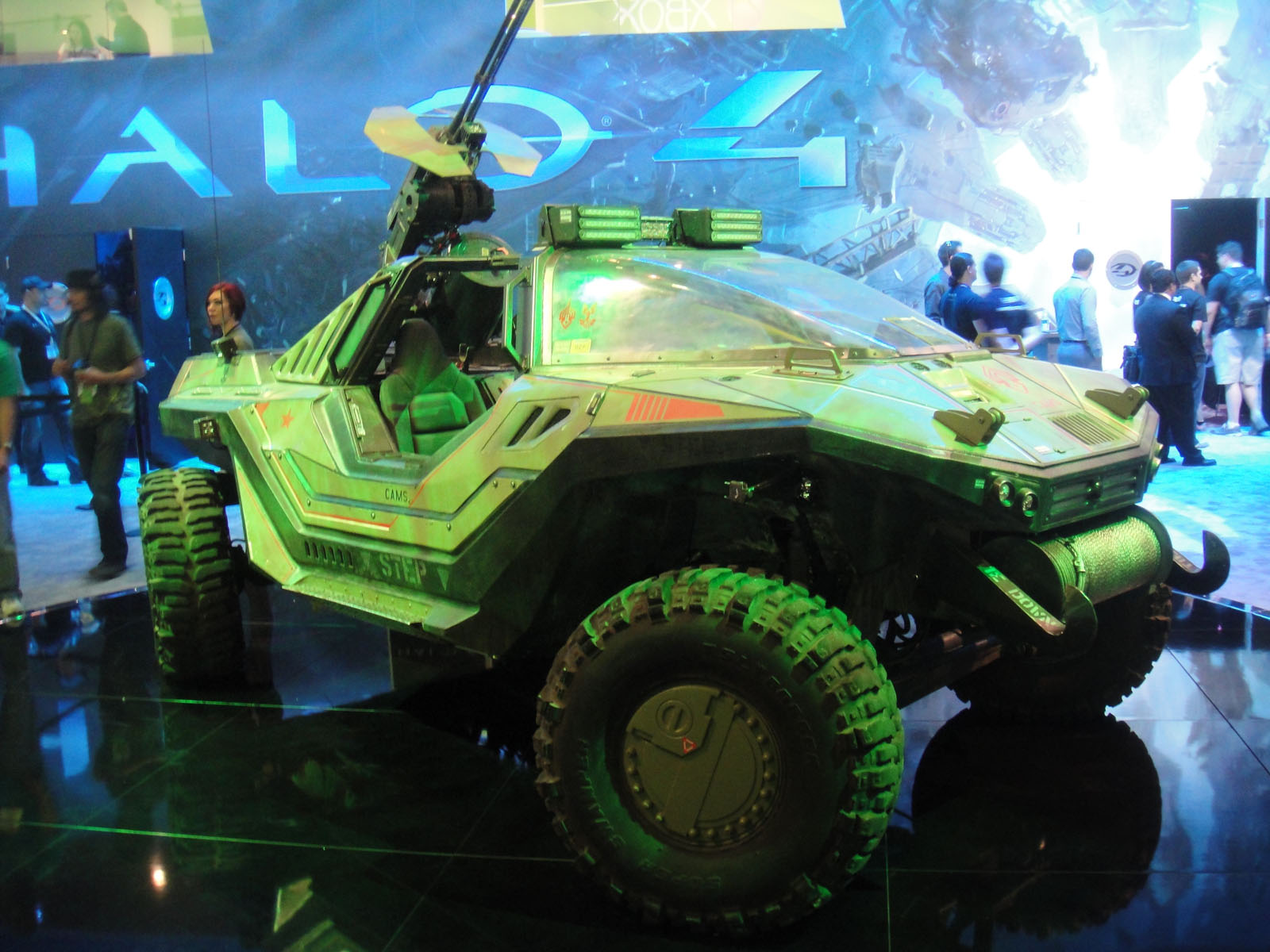
The Warthog prop built by Weta Workshop

The series was shot over twenty-five days in May 2012 in the forests around Vancouver, at Simon Fraser University and at additional stages in Burnaby. The Herzog and Company production team was in Vancouver for three months with set design by Legacy Effects, the same company that worked on the previous shorts.

The Warthog (a 4WD off-road vehicle with a mounted minigun) that appears in Forward Unto Dawn is the same one that was produced by Weta Workshop and used in Landfall. Stunt driver Johnathon Kralt found that the prop "handles the roads extremely well for something that size and that height", and the four-wheel steering was an advantage for drifting. Many chase shots were made using a Mercedes-Benz ML 55 pursuit vehicle with a camera boom mounted to the roof. Another rig involved towing the Warthog on a low trailer so that cameras could focus on an actor while the vehicle was being "driven".

The visual effects supervisor, John Sullivan, hired Arc Productions to create just under 500 shots with computer-generated imagery, between a quarter and a third of what a blockbuster film would feature. The Covenant that appear are all completely computer generated, as is the academy's space elevator, weapons' muzzle flashes and a few shots of Master Chief. Hendler felt that the visual effects were the area that needed particular focus and spent a much larger percentage of the budget on the Master Chief costume and computer generated imagery than is normal for a production.

One scene involves a Covenant Elite stalking the cadets in the armoury. The geometry of the Elite already exists for the Halo video games but it couldn't be directly transferable to the Mental Ray renderer so it had to be re-topologized in ZBrush and Maya. The outdoor attack on the academy was filmed at Simon Fraser University and required photogrammetric reconstruction and laser measurement to add the aliens and weapons lighting effects in a convincing manner. A later scene in the forest was too complex to use the same techniques, lacking the geometric shapes of the university campus. Instead, Arc visual effects supervisor Terry Bradley scattered LEDs on the set. By measuring the distance between LEDs the studio could model the area with software, and then used SketchUp and Maya to add the weapons fire. The shattering of the pink "needles" fired by the Covenant was rendered in Houdini as the shots hit concrete and Master Chief's armour.

The opening sequences of each episode show Cortana, an artificial intelligence, aboard the spaceship Forward Unto Dawn as she malfunctions. The five sequences were entirely computer generated by Polynoid, the animation team of Blacklist, a production company.

== Setting ==
Forward Unto Dawn takes place on a fictional planet, Circinius-IV, one of many that humans have colonized outside of the Solar System. The protagonist, Thomas Lasky, is aboard a spaceship named the UNSC Infinity in 2557. Forward Unto Dawn portrays his memory of the events on Circinius-IV in 2526, when he is a cadet at the Corbulo Academy, a training facility for the children of high-ranking UNSC officers. The UNSC is training the cadets for war with insurrectionists on various colony planets.

A Covenant army attacks the academy causing confusion and panic. Although not made clear in Forward Unto Dawn, the Covenant are a theocratic collection of alien species that are religiously offended by Humanity and seek to eradicate it. The events portrayed in Forward Unto Dawn are some of the earliest encounters with the Covenant, and the characters other than Master Chief were unaware of their existence.

== Casting and characters ==
The production team was responsible for casting, but Microsoft maintained a final say. The decision to use Alex Puccinelli instead of Steve Downes, the previous voice artist of Master Chief, was approved by Microsoft. The actors playing the cadets attended a boot camp before shooting to raise their fitness and accustom them to assault courses and rifle drills in their armour costumes. Cast members drove themselves to overexertion in the training, causing some to vomit, which they saw as a bonding experience.

Thom Green plays the protagonist Thomas Lasky, a cadet at Corbulo Academy and Ty Olsson plays the adult rendition. Lasky is "ambivalent about his role in the military", considering diplomacy a better option to warfare. Lasky is from a military family; his mother is a colonel and his brother Cadmon (played by Max Carver) was an ODST (Orbital Drop Shock Troopers - a special forces unit in the Halo universe), but Thomas is uninterested in becoming an officer. Green portrayed Lasky as a "regular teenager", unsure of his future. As research for the role, Green was required to watch the previous shorts and read the "Halo encyclopedia" that 343 Industries uses to preserve the Halo canon. Executive producer Josh Feldman considers Lasky an important character in the Halo universe beyond just Forward Unto Dawn and Halo 4.

Daniel Cudmore was cast to play the role of Master Chief largely due to his height and physique. The director, Stewart Hendler, wanted to contrast the size of Master Chief to that of the teenage cadets; Cudmore is 203 centimetres (6 ft 8 in) tall whereas the actors playing the cadets were deliberately chosen to be "short, scrawny freshmen". In order to accurately portray Master Chief, Cudmore watched the Landfall shorts by Neill Blomkamp and read the Halo novels for the history of the character, having already played the games. Cudmore expressed interest in the history of Master Chief, the character's view on war and his role as a soldier, as he was only required to portray a utilitarian character in the series. Cudmore thinks the character is torn between aiding the cadets and completing his mission, but Master Chief's confidence and actions inspire the cadets.

Legacy Effects took a body scan of Cudmore, then overlaid a 3D model provided by Microsoft and edited it to get proportions correct. A prototype was 3D printed and then used to make moulds for the final suit. The majority of the suit is rubber over a foam bodysuit, similar to a wetsuit, with a fibreglass helmet. Cudmore compared wearing it to walking through water, although he had to perform stunts in the suit as it was made only for his body. Cudmore repeatedly watched the video of his movements immediately after they were shot to ensure that they were deliberate but without appearing robotic, "trying to make his movements a little larger than life, but still with a sense of humanity to them." Both Hendler and Frank O'Connor praised Cudmore, not just for his physique but for moving in a fluid manner in the cumbersome suit.

Anna Popplewell plays Chyler Silva, a cadet who, contrary to Lasky's beliefs, is a full supporter of the war against the insurrectionists. Popplewell portrays Silva as a competent cadet who has been hardened by her childhood surrounded by insurrectionist violence. She had a romantic connection with Lasky that was interrupted by the Covenant attack. Popplewell was new to the Halo series when cast for the role but thinks that the characters and aesthetic of the series have the potential to draw in a new audience.

Other characters include cadets April Orenski, a senior cadet and squad leader, played by Enisha Brewster, Junjie Chen, played by Osric Chau, who is the only cadet without a military family and has gained entry to the academy through his own achievements, Dimah Tchakova played by Kat de Lieva, Walter Vickers played by Iain Belcher and Michael Sullivan, played by Masam Holden.

== Episodes ==
No.	Title	Directed by	Written by	Original release date
1	"Part 1"	Stewart Hendler	Aaron Helbing & Todd Helbing	October 5, 2012
Thomas Lasky is a freshman officer cadet struggling to fit in at the prestigious Corbulo Academy of Military Science. He clashes with other members of Hastati squad, his training squad, and ignores orders, leading to low marks in training exercises. With only the encouragement of fellow freshman Chyler Silva, Lasky struggles to live up to the expectations of his military family. In his spare time, he is seen frequently watching video correspondence from his brother, Cadmon, who is an Orbital Drop Shock Trooper deployed to a combat zone.
2	"Part 2"	Stewart Hendler	Aaron Helbing & Todd Helbing	October 12, 2012
Hastati Squad remains under scrutiny by commanders because of its poor performance, which the other cadets blame on Lasky. Lasky and fellow squadmate Vickers fight over this in the academy mess hall. After reflecting on his situation, Lasky has a change of heart and decides to take initiative, volunteering to take point in the final training exercise of the term, a game of capture the flag against another squad. Lasky orchestrates a successful ambush on the other squad, but collapses as he approaches the flag.
3	"Part 3"	Stewart Hendler	Aaron Helbing & Todd Helbing	October 19, 2012
Lasky discovers that he has a severe allergy which would allow him to be medically discharged from service, which leaves him contemplating his future. It is revealed that his brother Cadmon was killed in combat against insurrectionists. Lasky and Silva meet outside the academy grounds and, while discussing his future, share a kiss. In the meantime, cadet Sullivan has decoded classified combat footage which shows UNSC troops, insurrectionists, and Spartans fighting together against a new, unseen foe. An alarm is sounded at the academy, and as the cadets attempt to evacuate via a space elevator, several Covenant vessels appear in the sky, destroying the elevator. An Elite appears out of the smoke as UNSC forces begin to defend the academy.
4	"Part 4"	Stewart Hendler	Aaron Helbing & Todd Helbing	October 26, 2012
The Covenant attack overwhelms the UNSC defences, killing most of the cadets and humans on the planet. As the remainder of Hastati Squad attempts to flee from an Elite, they send a distress signal but are trapped in an armoury. Just as the Elite prepares to strike, it is killed by Spartan John 117, AKA Master Chief, who escorts Lasky, Orenski, Silva, and Sullivan out of the grounds. Outside they are ambushed by several Jackals and Sullivan is wounded, but the group manages to escape the academy via a Warthog, heading for the forest and evacuation from the planet.
5	"Part 5"	Stewart Hendler	Aaron Helbing & Todd Helbing	November 2, 2012
Driving through the dark forest, Chief and the remaining cadets fight off Jackals in the trees. Lasky crashes into one of the aliens on the road, causing the Warthog to stall. While Chief patches up Sullivan, Silva realises she's been wounded. Chief covers the cadets as they abandon the vehicle in the face of larger aliens called Hunters. Silva hands Lasky her dogtags before dying. The Chief catches up to the cadets and they run from another Hunter. Lasky volunteers to act as a diversion, allowing Chief to kill the last Hunter. The group rendezvous with the Pelican and escape the planet. 32 years later, Lasky, now a Commander on the vessel UNSC Infinity, is seen ordering a jump after listening to a distress beacon sent by Cortana from UNSC Forward Unto Dawn.

== Release ==
On April 30, 2012, Microsoft Studios announced that Forward Unto Dawn would play on Machinima Prime and Halo Waypoint (a marketing website for the Halo series) during the weeks leading up to the release of Halo 4. The series' first episode attracted five million views on YouTube within two weeks and, as of March 2013, has eleven million views. The second episode attracted three million views within two weeks and six million views by March 2013; however, these statistics do not include views on Halo Waypoint.

The series consists of five 15-minute shorts, the first released on October 5, 2012, with subsequent episodes released weekly. A 90-minute extended version is included with the Limited Edition version of Halo 4, and became available on Blu-ray, DVD, Xbox Video, iTunes and video on demand services on December 4, 2012. The Blu-ray and DVD versions contain bonus features including audio commentary from Stewart Hendler and 343 Industries, a live-action Red vs. Blue PSA entitled Sleeper, as well as vignettes and making-of documentaries. On January 18, 2013, Content Media Corporation announced that they had international distribution rights for Forward Unto Dawn for television.

McFarlane Toys produced 500 units of a collectible statue to tie-in with Forward Unto Dawn in December 2012. The statue is a thirty-six centimetre (14") tall model of Master Chief fighting a Hunter, as depicted in Forward Unto Dawn. On November 6, 2012, to coincide with the release of Halo 4, Mega Bloks released a model of the UNSC spaceship, Forward Unto Dawn. The model is approximately one metre (3') long and has scenes from both the video game and the web series.

== Critical reception ==
Reviewers were divided on what standard to expect of the series and what to compare it to; the budget was beyond that of other web series but not on par with a film.

IGN reviewer Jesse Schedeen considered the cadets other than Lasky and Silva to be "ready-made cannon fodder," having received minimal development. This detracted from the quality of the third episode, as a betrayal by cadet Tchakova had little impact due to her shallow development. However, Schedeen did appreciate Green's acting in the last episode, noting that "[Silva's] death scene was handled very well, particularly as it forced Tom Green to shed his calm exterior and react much more emotionally." In his later review of the Blu-ray, Schedeen complimented the audio and video quality, as well as the inclusion of many vignettes, documentary featurettes and commentaries.

James Plath of Movie Metropolis also found the characters lacking in the first half, but noted that in the second half, the characters of Lasky and Silva "actually move beyond the clichés and pick up a personality along the way". Plath was impressed by the soundtrack, thinking it "worthy of any big-screen action flick" and also complimented the special effects saying "the CGI work is enhanced by high definition, not exposed by it." Overall however, he thought that despite the action being exciting, the "pedestrian" first half and "only adequate acting" would prevent Forward Unto Dawn appealing to an audience beyond existing gamers.

Official Xbox Magazine's reviewer, Edwin Evans, appreciated the direction of the series; "Stewart Hendler's well-judged editing keeps the script from sinking under the weight of its own melodrama, and his close-ups never overstay their welcome, hiding the weaknesses of the inexperienced (but talented) cast." He also echoed Plath's thoughts on the slow first half and exciting second half.

== Awards and nominations ==
Awards and nominations for Halo 4: Forward Unto Dawn
Year	Award Show	Category	Winner/Nominee	Result	Ref.
2013	3rd Streamy Awards	Best Writing: Drama	Todd & Aaron Helbing	Nominated	
2013	3rd Streamy Awards	Best Male Performance: Drama	Tom Green	Nominated	
2013	3rd Streamy Awards	Best Female Performance: Drama	Anna Popplewell	Nominated	
2013	3rd Streamy Awards	Best Drama Series	Halo 4: Forward Unto Dawn	Won	
2013	3rd Streamy Awards	Best Action or Sci-Fi Series	Halo 4: Forward Unto Dawn	Nominated	
2013	3rd Streamy Awards	Best Production Design	Kasra Farahani	Won	
2013	3rd Streamy Awards	Best Cinematography	Brett Pawlak	Won	
2013	3rd Streamy Awards	Best Editing	Michael Louis Hill	Won	
2013	3rd Streamy Awards	Audience Choice for Series of the Year	Halo 4: Forward Unto Dawn	Nominated	
2013	MPSE Golden Reel Awards	Best Sound Editing: Computer Episodic Entertainment	Halo 4: Forward Unto Dawn	Won	
2013	Visual Effects Society Awards	Outstanding Virtual Cinematography in a Commercial or Broadcast Program	Halo 4: Forward Unto Dawn	Nominated	
2013	65th Primetime Emmy Awards	Outstanding Main Title Design	Halo 4: Forward Unto Dawn	Nominated	

== See also ==
- Halo 4 Original Soundtrack
- Halo: The Fall of Reach
