= The Life (advertisement) =

2009 American video game commercial

- Tarkov as he appears in the final scene of The Life
- Agency: T.A.G.
- Client: Microsoft
- Language: English (text); Hungarian (speech); Welsh (lyrics)
- Running time: 150 seconds
- Product: Halo 3: ODST
- Release date: September 7, 2009
- Directed by: Rupert Sanders
- Music by: Human
- Production company: Morton/Jankel/Zander
- Produced by: Eric Stern
- Country: United States

The Life, also known as We Are ODST, is a television and cinema advertisement launched in 2009 by Microsoft to promote the first-person shooter Halo 3: ODST in the United States. The 150-second piece follows a young soldier through enlistment, training, and battle as an Orbital Drop Shock Trooper (ODST), analogous to a paratrooper that drops from space to a battlefield. The Life was created by advertising agency T.A.G., an offshoot of McCann Erickson. Production of the commercial itself was handled by production company Morton/Jankel/Zander (MJZ). It was directed by Rupert Sanders, and post-production was conducted by Asylum. It was filmed in Hungary, just outside Budapest in a coal mine and abandoned factories to give the sequence an "Eastern Bloc" aesthetic.

The commercial and its associated campaign proved hugely successful; in the week of its launch, Halo 3: ODST became the top-selling game for the Xbox 360 worldwide, and over 2.5 million copies were sold within the first few weeks of release. The Life went on to win a number of honours from the advertising and entertainment industries, including two Clio Awards, a London International Advertising Award and several honours from the Cannes Lions International Advertising Festival, the most prestigious awards ceremony in the advertising industry.

== Sequence ==
The Life opens to a military funeral of an ODST. Rows of candles arranged along the floor burn as a bagpiper plays a dirge. The assembled mourners, a mix of military personnel and civilians, attend as the casket's red ODST flag is removed, revealing the name of the deceased. A young man looks on as the cloth is ceremonially folded and passed to a woman among the mourners. A song in Welsh begins to play as the attending officer orders a gun salute in Hungarian. The camera cuts to another scene; the young man, Tarkov, is having his head shaved in the first of a montage of scenes depicting Tarkov undergoing recruit training. Again, the camera cuts ahead. Tarkov is in a one-man "drop pod", known in universe as the Single Occupant Exoatmospheric Insertion Vehicle (SOEIV), entering the atmosphere of an alien planet, onto a battlefield. He emerges under fire alongside several other soldiers, moving over corpses and through plasma fire until a Covenant Brute knocks him aside, sending his helmet flying and scarring Tarkov's face. Tarkov unholsters and fires his M6S (silenced M-6 magnum) sidearm at the Brute to no avail. However, he is saved when a falling alien aircraft crashes into the Brute, killing it. The film jumps ahead again; Tarkov is now a veteran soldier, and oversees a memorial service for one of his fallen comrades amidst burning ruins with a recruit that bears a resemblance to a younger Tarkov. Soon, sounds of gunfire draws him and his team back to the fight, closing with the lines "We are ODST" which transitions again into "Halo 3: ODST".

== Production ==
=== Background ===
In 1999, Microsoft made the decision to consolidate its marketing efforts with a single advertising agency, after several years of partnership with different agencies for each of its product line. They entertained pitches from each of the agencies on their roster, and ultimately assigned the global account to McCann Erickson. McCann was assigned the task of promoting what would become the killer app of the Xbox, the video game Halo: Combat Evolved. The launch campaign was hugely successful, selling over five million copies of the game worldwide. The success of Halo: Combat Evolved led to a series of sequels and tie-in merchandise including books and action figures.

In 2007, McCann launched a multi-platform global advertising campaign titled Believe, that included six minutes of live-action sequences called Landfall, to promote the latest game in the Halo series, Halo 3. Landfall was directed by Neill Blomkamp who also agreed to direct a full length Halo film, but it was cancelled due to funding disagreements. Believe proved a critical and financial hit. Over £84 million of sales were made on the first day of release alone, the highest-grossing opening sale of an entertainment product at the time. Believe received dozens of awards from the advertising community, including eight Clio Awards, Best in Show at the ANDY Awards, and two Grand Prix (for Film and Integrated campaigns) at the Cannes Lions International Advertising Festival, the most prestigious awards ceremony in the advertising industry. According to the Gunn Report, Believe was the second-most-awarded integrated advertising campaign of 2008, behind Earth Hour for the World Wide Fund for Nature.

In 2012, due to the success of Landfall and The Life, Halo 4: Forward Unto Dawn was created to broaden the audience of Halo 4. Released initially as five 15-minute episodes online, it was later released as a ninety-minute extended cut on DVD and Blu-ray. Microsoft considers it the "next step" between advertising material and a full-length film, and Frank O'Connor, development director for the Halo franchise, has said that a film will be made "when the time is right". Live action shorts were also used in the advertisement of Halo: Reach focusing on the Spartan supersoldiers of the Halo universe. Two shorts, The Birth of a Spartan and Deliver Hope were made, again to appeal to customers who were unfamiliar with the series.

=== Filming ===
In early 2009, McCann received a brief to create a new campaign for the latest entrant into the Halo series, a first-person shooter called Halo 3: ODST. It would be the first game in the franchise not to feature the series' protagonist, the Master Chief. McCann returned with a pitch for a campaign in the same vein as Believe, aiming to humanize the soldiers featured in the Halo universe. The project was greenlit, and McCann brought back several collaborators from Believe to handle this new campaign, now given the working title of The Life.

Director Rupert Sanders, known for his work with production company MJZ on campaigns such as Lava for Guinness and Great Return for Nike, Inc., was given five weeks to produce the commercial, with three days set aside for filming. Several locations were scouted for shooting, with an eye towards an "Eastern Bloc" aesthetic. These included several areas around Chernobyl, Ukraine. However, the tight schedule precluded using locations too distant from one another for different scenes and, in the end, three spots outside of Budapest, Hungary were settled upon: the cooling tower of an active nuclear power station was dressed to act as the backdrop to the opening funeral scene; an open-pit coal mine served as the setting for the battle scenes, and an abandoned aluminum factory was used to stage the closing funeral scene.

Sanders drew inspiration for the shooting style and aesthetic of the commercial from a variety of sources, including news footage from journalists embedded with military forces in Afghanistan, and Russian feature films such as Stalker and Come and See. To keep the details within the commercial consistent with established Halo canon, the creators of the Halo series, Bungie, provided Sanders with information on aspects ranging from appropriate fur color and rank insignia for the Brute, to the armor and weaponry of the ODST soldiers.

=== Post-production ===
With filming complete, MJZ contacted post-production company Asylum to begin work on the substantial visual effects component of The Life. The team, led by Visual Effects Supervisor Robert Moggach, tripled in size as the scale of the work required became apparent, given the deadline of three weeks. Work on the opening funeral scene was relatively easy, requiring the creation of only minor elements such as additional tombstones in the foreground and color correction on the actors. The same was true for the training sequence, where only minimal tracking work and compositing of matte backgrounds was required. The bulk of the visual effects work was in the battle sequence. This ranged from simple work such as wire removal to the creation of dynamic lighting and reflections from visors and armor, to particle effects for the background smoke and dust, plasma weapon fire and alterations to some of the filmed explosions to lend them the appearance given to plasma explosions within the Halo games. The entire background was a 3D projection of matte paintings and dramatic skies. While the Brute was partially animatronic, substantial adjustments such as scaling to almost twice the size and the enhancement of fine muscle movements of the creature were made. Other elements, such as the Banshee aircraft and the drop-pods, were created entirely through the use of CGI. Software used by Asylum FX included Flame and Nuke for compositing, Maya for animation, RenderMan and Mantra for rendering, SynthEyes for tracking, Silhouette Pro for rotoscoping work.

=== Music ===
The Life was scored by Gareth Williams, a composer for Human Worldwide. The music, an arrangement of Light of Aidan's "Lament", was created specifically for the ad, and featured a wide variety of instruments. Percussive elements included military snare drums, a hand drum, Samoan log drums and stones tapped against one another. These were joined by a Great Highland Bagpipe and traditional string orchestration such as a double bass and cello. Vocals were provided by Kathy Fisher who, despite not being a native speaker of the language, sang the Welsh lyrics provided by Peter Anthony Freeman. The song was later expanded by Williams and used in the original soundtrack for King Arthur: Legend of the Sword under the title "Politics and The Life".

== Release and reception ==
The Life premiered online as a 90-second cut on September 4, 2009, on both the social networking website MySpace and news and review website IGN. This was followed by its first appearance on U.S. national television as a 150-second spot three days later, during a commercial break in Spike's airing of the World War II miniseries Band of Brothers. Additional 90-second spaces were purchased on a variety of television networks, including Adult Swim, Comedy Central, ESPN, FX, G4, History, and Spike. The Life was made available for download through Xbox Live on September 8, and continued to air on television through the release of Halo 3: ODST on September 22, 2009 and into the Christmas period. The launch was accompanied by print advertisements and a new interactive website featuring a making-of documentary for The Life, interviews with the director and other crew members, and an unaired scene cut from the ending of the commercial, as well as interactive elements exploring features of the game itself, such as an "evaluation" application offering profiles on several of the game's characters.

Upon its release on September 22, Halo 3: ODST immediately became the best-selling title for the Xbox 360 worldwide. Within two weeks, over 2.5 million copies had been sold. The Life went on to win a number of awards from the advertising and television industries, including honors from the Visual Effects Society Awards, the ANDY Awards, the London International Advertising Awards, and the Clio Awards. The Life received several nominations at the 57th Cannes Lions International Advertising Festival, the most prestigious awards ceremony in the advertising community, going on to win Gold for Cinematography, Silver for Direction, and a Bronze in the Film category.
