= Halo Wars 2 =

2017 real-time strategy video game

- The cover art shows the leader of the Banished faction, Atriox.
- Developers: 343 Industries; Creative Assembly
- Publisher: Microsoft Studios
- Artist: Jeremy Cook
- Writer: Kevin Grace
- Composers: Gordy Haab; Brian Lee White; Brian Trifon
- Series: Halo
- Platforms: Windows; Xbox One
- Release: February 21, 2017
- Genre: Real-time strategy
- Modes: Single-player, multiplayer

Halo Wars 2 is a real-time strategy video game developed by 343 Industries and Creative Assembly. It was published by Microsoft Studios and released in February 2017 on Windows and Xbox One. The game is set in the science fiction universe of the Halo franchise in 2559. It is a sequel to Halo Wars (2009). The story follows the crew of Spirit of Fire, a United Nations Space Command (UNSC) ship. Spirit of Fire arrives at the Ark, a Forerunner installation responsible for constructing and remotely controlling the titular Halo rings. Conflict breaks out between the UNSC forces and an alien faction known as the Banished over control of the Ark.

In Halo Wars 2, players construct a base of operations, accumulate resources to produce infantry and vehicle units, and command their armies from a bird's-eye view of the battlefield. The primary goal during a battle is typically to destroy an opponent's bases or to capture and control territories on the battlefield. Combat is balanced by a "rock–paper–scissors" counter-attack system, in which ground vehicles are effective in combat against infantry, infantry are effective against aircraft, and aircraft are effective against ground vehicles. The game supports online multiplayer for playing cooperatively or competitively with other players.

Development of Halo Wars 2 began in 2014 when Halo franchise developer 343 Industries approached development studio Creative Assembly about a collaboration. Creative Assembly were chosen for their years of experience in developing real-time strategy games. The developer 343 Industries wanted to integrate the story of Halo Wars 2 more closely with the ongoing storyline of the Halo series, leading them to set the game 28 years after the original Halo Wars to fix the story in the current timeline of the franchise. The game was announced in 2015 at Gamescom and showcased at a number of video game events before release. Two open betas ran during the final year of the game's production so the development team could make adjustments to the game based on player feedback.

Halo Wars 2 received generally positive reviews. Blur Studio's campaign cinematics were lauded for their outstanding animation quality. Reviewers thought the game was very approachable for beginners, but felt it needed more strategic depth to appeal to experienced RTS players. Nuisances in the keyboard and mouse controls left some critics disappointed, but enhancements made to the gamepad control scheme from Halo Wars were praised. The game was supported after release with additional content and features.

== Gameplay ==
UNSC forces attack a Banished Scarab. The green aura surrounding UNSC units is an active leader ability that restores health to the encircled units.

Halo Wars 2 is a military science fiction real-time strategy video game, in which players command armies from a bird's-eye view of the battlefield. The game may be played on PC using a gamepad or using a mouse and keyboard. Like its predecessor Halo Wars, it features two playable factions: humanity's military arm, the United Nations Space Command, and an alien faction, the Banished. In most game modes, players establish a base of operations at a predetermined location. Barracks and vehicle depots can be constructed at bases to deploy infantry and vehicles. Supplies collected via supply pads or from the battlefield are expended to deploy units and construct buildings. Some units and buildings require a second resource, power, which is produced using a generator or extractor building. Base buildings can be upgraded to grant passive bonuses and unlock access to higher-tier units.

The battlefield is initially shrouded by the fog of war, which is uncovered by moving units to clouded regions of the map. Units can be selected and commanded to engage in combat or interact with structures on the battlefield. Combat is balanced by a "rock–paper–scissors" counter-attack system, in which ground vehicles are generally effective in combat against infantry, infantry are effective against aircraft, and aircraft are effective against ground vehicles. Every unit has at least one special ability in addition to regular attacks. For example, Spartan supersoldiers are capable of hijacking vehicles and performing a smash attack after leaping into the air. Players can build additional bases once they have accumulated enough resources and gained control over areas of the map, allowing them to expand their army.

A campaign mode lets players take control of UNSC forces in battles against the Banished on the Ark. The main campaign consists of twelve missions that can be played alone or cooperatively. Each mission presents main objectives that involve capturing points, defending bases, or surviving waves of enemies, and often require players to lead Spartan units around the map. Campaign missions offer optional side objectives such as ensuring a certain unit survives over the course of the mission or destroying extra bases within a time limit. Animated cutscenes and dialogue precede each mission to provide context and integration with the game's story. A secondary campaign lets players control Banished forces in a battle against parasitic alien life forms known collectively as the Flood.

Outside the campaign, both the UNSC and the Banished are playable, each with a distinct set of units. Players choose a leader that is based on a prominent character and emphasizes a particular style of play. Leaders have unique abilities that can be upgraded and activated during a battle; using one requires supplies and triggers a cooldown period before it is available again. Healing groups of units, carpet bombing a targeted area, and deploying special troops are examples of some leader abilities. The game's multiplayer modes support online play with up to six players. Game modes include Skirmish, a cooperative or solo play mode against computer-controlled (AI) opponents; Deathmatch involves eliminating the opponent's army. Stronghold and Domination, modes centered around controlling territory on the map; and Blitz, a mode that combines elements from collectible card games with RTS gameplay by replacing base building with a card-and-deck mechanic for unit deployment. Decks are created from card packs earned through the campaign mode and daily challenges. Each card features a deployable unit and has an energy cost; deploying a more powerful unit uses more energy. Energy generates automatically throughout a match and more can be collected from pods dropped onto the map periodically. Blitz Firefight is a single-player and cooperative variant that pits players against waves of artificial intelligence (AI) enemies.

== Synopsis ==
=== Setting and characters ===
Halo Wars 2 takes place in the science fiction universe of the Halo series. The game is set in 2559, 28 years after the events of Halo Wars and shortly after the events of Halo 5: Guardians. Halo Wars closes with the crew of the human United Nations Space Command (UNSC) warship Spirit of Fire entering cryosleep and drifting in uncharted space. During the interim, the war between humanity and the alien alliance known as the Covenant has ended, and Spirit of Fire has been declared lost with all hands. While Spirit of Fire is adrift in space, the ship's artificial intelligence (AI) Serina (Courtenay Taylor) terminates herself before succumbing to rampancy, a terminal state. Captain James Cutter (Gideon Emery), Professor Anders (Faye Kingslee), and the rest of the crew wake from cryonic sleep at the Ark, a Forerunner installation capable of manufacturing large ringworlds known as Halos. Isabel (Erika Soto) is a UNSC logistics AI operating at a research facility on the Ark when an alien faction called the Banished invades. The Banished are led by the Brute warlord Atriox (John DiMaggio) and rose to power following the Covenant's demise. Serving under Atriox are the Brute general Decimus and the Elite Shipmaster Let 'Volir (Darin De Paul).

=== Main story ===
Arriving at the Ark, Spirit of Fire's crew receives a UNSC signal from the surface of the installation. Spartan Red Team—composed of supersoldiers Alice, Jerome, and Douglas—is deployed to investigate the signal. They recover Isabel from a UNSC base but are attacked by the Banished during exfiltration. Back on Spirit of Fire, Isabel reveals to Captain Cutter how Atriox and the Banished invaded the Ark. Despite Isabel believing resistance hopeless, Cutter declares his intent to confront the Banished. A strike team manages to set up a forward base and defeat Banished forces under the control of Decimus. In the wreckage of Decimus' base, Isabel discovers information about the Ark's Cartographer, a map of key systems and weapons.

The strike team secures the Cartographer, coming under attack by autonomous Forerunner machines known as Sentinels. Anders discovers that Atriox has hijacked the Ark's teleportation network, allowing him to transport troops across the whole structure. The UNSC forces defeat Decimus and disable the portal network. The Spirit of Fire comes under attack from the Banished carrier Enduring Conviction. The attacking carrier is destroyed when Isabel and Jerome hijack its weapon systems and attack the Ark, prompting the Sentinels stationed on the Ark to shatter it in two.

Anders suggests that they hijack an unfinished Halo ring from the Ark's foundry to send from the Ark back into UNSC-controlled space to signal for reinforcements. The new Halo is released but UNSC forces face resistance from the Banished, who begin boarding the ring. On the Ark, Alice and Douglas prevent Banished reinforcements, including Atriox, from getting to the Halo. Anders is escorted to the ring's control room where the firing system of the structure is deactivated and a signal beacon is set. Taking control of the ring's gravity systems, Anders ejects part of the landmass containing the Banished forces into space, killing them. Having defeated the Banished forces on the ring, ground forces return to the Spirit of Fire, but Anders is left behind as the Halo enters slipspace because they cannot halt the jump's countdown. Before the Halo jumps, Anders promises to get help from the UNSC as soon as possible, and Cutter and Atriox prepare for their next engagement. In a post-credits scene, Anders' Halo drops out of slipspace prematurely, only to encounter a Forerunner Guardian.

=== Campaign expansions ===
The Operation SPEARBREAKER missions take place one month following the launch of the Halo Ring. The Spirit of Fire and the Banished are still fighting for control of the Ark. A UNSC Squad, Sunray 1-1, stumble upon a Banished operation to repair a Forerunner ship and destroy the Spirit of Fire with it. Fighting though hordes of Banished forces and Sentinels, Sunray 1-1 is able to narrowly destroy the Forerunner ship before it can launch.

The Awakening the Nightmare campaign takes place five months after Operation SPEARBREAKER. The war between UNSC and Banished has reached a stalemate. Desperate for more supplies, Atriox orders the brothers Voridus and Pavium to search near the ruins of the former Covenant holy city of High Charity for salvage. Atriox warns them not to enter High Charity, believing in the stories of the city having been consumed by the parasitic Flood. The headstrong Voridus ignores the warnings, deactivating the Sentinel defenses and breaching the shield surrounding the city. His rash decision results in the Flood's escape and assimilation of many Banished into the Flood's ranks.

Rather than contact Atriox for assistance and risk his wrath, Voridus claims he can reactivate the Sentinel defenses from another location. The pair activate a drill to propagate natural disasters and hold the Flood at bay temporarily while Voridus leads a handful of troops into a Sentinel base to reactivate the defense network. Voridus succeeds in reactivating the defenses, but the brothers learn that Atriox has learned of their actions and is coming. Atriox warns that he will kill them if they fail to clean up their mess by the time he arrives. Pushing the Flood back to the area surrounding High Charity, the brothers discover that the Flood is rapidly developing a coordinating intelligence, a Proto-Gravemind—if it finishes growing, the Flood on the Ark will be unstoppable. The Banished are able to destroy the Proto-Gravemind just before Atriox arrives. He scolds the two brothers and orders them to clean up their mess, but spares their lives. Sentinels flood into the area to deal with the Flood threat along with the Banished, containing the Flood in High Charity once more.

== Development ==
In 2009, Microsoft Studios launched Halo Wars, a real-time strategy spin-off from the first-person shooter series Halo. It was developed by Microsoft subsidiary Ensemble Studios. While Halo Wars was a commercial success, Ensemble Studios was shut down after development. Before its closure, the studio had started planning a story for a sequel. According to Halo Wars lead writer Graeme Devine, this script explored the history of the Forerunners and involved Spirit of Fire arriving at a Forerunner station tracked by Anders. In 2007, Microsoft formed an internal division, 343 Industries, to develop Halo products, and the studio searched for a developer to partner on a Halo Wars sequel. They viewed working with other developers and using external experience as key to maintaining quality across their projects.

In 2014, 343 Industries began developing Halo Wars 2 after approaching UK-based developer Creative Assembly, a development studio owned by Sega. Creative Assembly was chosen because of their reputation in developing real-time strategy games such as Total War. The studio had considered creating an RTS for console and PC for a long time, so the prospect of working on Halo Wars 2 was viewed as a perfect opportunity. The Halo Wars 2 development team within Creative Assembly was composed of people who worked on Alien: Isolation (2014), the Total War series, and new employees hired for the project. While Creative Assembly is a PC-centric developer, staff from the Alien: Isolation team were able to provide experience in producing games for consoles. On January 18, 2017, the development team announced that the game had "gone gold".

=== Design ===
Creative Assembly's studio director Tim Heaton said the gameplay of Halo Wars 2 would not be similar to their Total War series. Their approach was to build upon the foundation established with Halo Wars. With Halo Wars 2, the development team hoped to introduce new players to the strategy game genre while appeasing experienced gamers by including a range of multiplayer modes that a wide spectrum of players could enjoy. They also wanted to extend the purpose of leader units and their abilities by giving each of them a more defining role in the style of play they represent. Creative Assembly thought the game needed more artillery units capable of performing long range attacks, however there were currently no suitable vehicles in the Halo universe. So they created two new vehicles for the role and checked they did not feel out of place using reference material supplied by 343 Industries. Creative director Alistair Hope viewed staying true to the source material as an important factor for all of Creative Assembly's games, but stated that the team were given more freedom to explore and expand the Halo universe than they had anticipated. Hope praised the control scheme used in Halo Wars and aimed to enhance the system by ensuring Halo Wars 2 would be intuitive to play on a console. One common control feature included in many PC RTS games but absent from the original Halo Wars is control groups, which lets sets of units be manually assigned to a key. As Halo Wars 2 was developed for console and PC, the designers were keen to include the feature for both versions of the game. 343 Industries had initially considered supporting cross-platform play between Windows and Xbox One devices but the feature was ultimately excluded from the game at launch.

The Blitz game mode resulted from experimenting with ideas for a fast-paced and accessible variation of RTS gameplay. The development team wanted to streamline mechanics, such as base building and resource management, which players typically viewed as being complex and intimidating. The initial design of Blitz involved players having an army roster, like in tabletop war games. After playtesting this version, they realized that the scale of battles would shrink and become less appealing over the course of the match. They revised the mode by implementing a card-and-deck system for unit deployment and introducing randomly spawning resources on the maps. Blitz was influenced by the Warzone game mode from Halo 5: Guardians and Blizzard Entertainment's collectible card game Hearthstone, taking design cues from the card collecting and deck building systems. 343 Industries' head of strategy games Dan Ayoub cited multiplayer online battle arena games as impactful on the design of Blitz, since they replaced resource management with individual unit combat.

Halo franchise development director Frank O'Connor explained that Halo Wars 2 would be more integrated with other fiction in the universe than its predecessor. The story of the first Halo Wars is set 20 years before Halo: Combat Evolved and is largely isolated from other games within the series. This was to prevent it from interfering with other projects (Halo 3 and Halo: Reach) that were also in development at the time. Consequently, Halo Wars 2 is set in the contemporary fictional timeline following the events of Halo 5: Guardians, and is said to have a "sense of scale" that the first game was missing. This decision also opened a narrative thread in Halo Wars 2, in which the returning characters are placed in an unfamiliar universe with outdated technology. Narrative director Kevin Grace said they took most of their inspiration for the game's tone from Halo: Combat Evolved.

The narrative team wanted to establish a new villain who was both powerful and intelligent, which led to the introduction of the Brute warlord Atriox. Grace cited the Arbiter as a great example of a character who was unique within his species; he noted that this trait was applied to the Brutes with the creation of Atriox. To subvert the notion that Brutes are just the "dumb muscle" of the Covenant, they wanted to present him as a smart commander who takes advantage of the alliance's collapse. Inspiration for the character was drawn from folklore legends such as Excalibur and stories of an underling rising to power. While the Banished have been referenced in previous Halo media, Halo Wars 2 marks their debut as the primary enemy faction. Real-world events and historical mercenary groups were a creative source for designing the Banished. From the beginning, Isabel was designed to exhibit flawed behavior to distinguish her from other AI characters in the series. Ellen Ripley in the 1986 film Aliens was a particular influence for her characterization.

Art director Jeremy Cook thought maintaining readability and clarity of the units and combat space was the highest priority of the game's art direction. He also wanted to make sure the visual style remained consistent with the Halo universe, by preserving the recognizable traits of the units and structures. The Banished's art style was designed to contrast visually with the UNSC. Cook wanted the Banished to be reminiscent of the Covenant but with a greater emphasis on the aesthetic of the Brute species. Existing Brute vehicles and weapons helped influence the design changes and creation of new technology in the Banished's arsenal.

The in-game cutscenes for Halo Wars 2 were created by animation company Blur Studio; they previously created cutscenes for some Halo games, including the original Halo Wars. The scenes were directed by Dave Wilson, who was the visual effects supervisor on the Halo Wars cutscenes. 343 Industries explained that alterations to the appearance of returning characters were a result of upgraded technology, the use of performance capture, and casting new actors. Wilson said advances in technology allowed the animation team to capture body motion, facial motion, and audio simultaneously for Halo Wars 2, unlike during the development of Halo Wars where each of these performances was recorded separately and later combined.

Two open multiplayer betas ran during the production of Halo Wars 2 so the development team could gather data and make adjustments based on community feedback. The first ran on Xbox One from June 13–23, 2016, and included the Deathmatch and Domination game modes. A second beta featuring the Blitz mode ran from January 20–30, 2017, on Windows and Xbox One. Players earned rewards for Halo 5: Guardians for participating in the first beta and Blitz card packs for participating in the second beta. Changes made to game following the betas included resolving connectivity issues, tuning the gameplay, and adjusting the control scheme and user interface.

=== Audio ===
Paul Lipson served as audio director on Halo Wars 2. The game's soundtrack was composed by Gordy Haab, Brian Lee White and Brian Trifon. White and Trifon had collaborated with Lipson on the music of previous Halo projects, such as Halo: The Master Chief Collection and the Halo Channel application. The composers analyzed design documents, artwork, and early versions of the game to learn about the story and motivations of characters. This research helped them to determine the emotional tone and instrumental choices for the music. They wanted to incorporate the customary components of Halo scores such as the use of a large orchestra, a choir, and electronic music, while also taking the music in a new direction. As Halo Wars 2 was considered a spin-off to the core Halo games, the composers were not as beholden to Martin O'Donnell's established sound of the series. This gave them the opportunity to experiment with the soundtrack and introduce elements like brass instruments to the music.

The opening track of Halo Wars 2's soundtrack, "Recommissioned", is an adaption of the "Spirit of Fire" theme from the original Halo Wars soundtrack. The composers wanted to put their own style on this existing theme. Specific melodies were written for each of the game's main characters to reflect their personalities. For example, the track "Run Little Demons" made use of tribal drums, electronic percussion, and heavy brass to capture the dread and terror induced by Atriox and the Banished. To generate an array of emotional effects, different instruments were used to create variations of the character themes. One goal was to have the music dynamically interact with dialogue and gameplay. The composers created music of different intensity levels to correspond with the player's actions in the game. For example, low intensity, ambient music would play during base construction and more percussive, thematic music would play during battles. A system was designed to adapt the score based on events occurring during gameplay and to prevent the music from becoming repetitive. The composers worked closely with Lipson and Creative Assembly's audio lead, Sam Cooper, on the implementation of the interactive audio. The live orchestra was recorded at the Newman Scoring Stage at 20th Century Fox's studio in Los Angeles. The Halo Wars 2 Original Game Soundtrack, featuring 21 tracks, was released in retail stores on February 17, 2017, and digitally on February 21, 2017.

== Marketing and release ==
At Gamescom in August 2015, Microsoft Studios announced Halo Wars 2 for Windows PCs and the Xbox One video game console. Trailers featuring cinematics from the game were released from the announcement of the game up to its launch. The announcement trailer at Gamescom 2015 showed an injured UNSC soldier being dragged away and Atriox taunting. The trailer shown at E3 2016 was created by Blur Studio, and depicted the leaders of both factions—Cutter and Atriox—facing off as their forces are engaged in conflict. At RTX 2016, 343 Industries revealed a teaser of the in-game cinematics, illustrating Spirit of Fire's arrival at the Ark and Spartan supersoldiers encountering the Banished. At The Game Awards 2016, a trailer focusing on Atriox's background and motives was presented. On February 9, 2017, Microsoft released two live action trailers showing Cutter and Atriox confronting each other in comedic real-life scenarios. Multiplayer modes from the game were available to play at a number of video gaming conventions and expos including E3, RTX, Gamescom, and Paris Games Week. 343 Industries and toy maker Mattel announced a partnership to create a new line of Halo toys based on Halo Wars 2. In August 2017, Dark Horse Comics published the first issue of Halo: Rise of Atriox, a five-chapter comic book limited series about the games' primary antagonist.

Halo Wars 2 was initially scheduled to be released for Windows and Xbox One in 2016, however it was delayed until February 21, 2017. It is the first Halo game to launch simultaneously on console and PC. The game was released as part of the Xbox Play Anywhere program which allows a digital purchase to be playable on both Windows and Xbox One. THQ Nordic handled distribution of the European retail PC release. An Ultimate Edition version of the game included a downloadable content (DLC) season pass, access to the game four days early, and a copy of Halo Wars: Definitive Edition—an enhanced version of the original game for Windows and Xbox One. Halo Wars 2 debuted in second place on the UK's weekly retail sales chart.

Following the launch of Halo Wars 2, a demo, featuring the campaign's opening mission and the Blitz Firefight mode, was released on the Xbox One and Windows. 343 Industries and Creative Assembly supported Halo Wars 2 post-release with additional content and updates. A multiplayer ranking system was withheld from the game at launch as the development team wanted gameplay to be as balanced as possible before its release. The DLC included new units, leaders, Blitz cards, and two extra campaign missions. The content was distributed on a monthly basis beginning in March 2017. A campaign expansion, Awakening the Nightmare, was revealed on June 12, 2017, and released on September 26, 2017. It also features new leaders, maps, and a cooperative mode. In late October 2017, Halo Wars 2 received a number of visual enhancements for the Xbox One X. Additionally, cross-platform play between console and PC was enabled.

== Reception ==
Reception

Aggregate score
Aggregator	Score
Metacritic	PC: 70/100; XONE: 79/100

Review scores
Publication	Score
GameSpot	6/10
GamesRadar+	3/5
IGN	7.0/10
PC Gamer (US)	65/100
Polygon	8/10
USgamer	4/5

The Xbox One version of Halo Wars 2 received "generally favorable" reviews from professional critics, while reception of the PC version was "mixed or average", according to review aggregator website Metacritic. The general consensus among critics was that Halo Wars 2 provided an accessible strategy game experience befitting newcomers but that it either lacked tactical depth or was too conservative in its design to appease veteran RTS players who had access to alternatives on PC. Several writers recommended the game to console players, in part due to the dearth of RTS games on Xbox One.

AI behavior in Halo Wars 2 drew some criticism. A few reviewers described the pathfinding of units as subpar, and others considered the enemy AI to be too easy on the normal difficulty setting. IGN disliked that bases had to be placed in predetermined locations; they found it to be limiting and said it constrained build order freedom. Rock, Paper, Shotgun was also concerned about the restrictions on base building initially, however they became fond of the idea after playing the game for some time.

Critics thought the enhancements made to the gamepad control scheme were smart and welcomed additions like controls groups. In some cases they still regarded the gamepad as a suboptimal control method, largely due to the nature of analog sticks being imprecise in comparison to a mouse. This led to some frustration among several writers as they were unable to avoid enemy attacks because maneuvering units was slow with a gamepad. While the mouse and keyboard controls were seen as superior for performing precise actions quickly, some reviewers considered the control method to be unpolished and believed concessions had been made for the gamepad. The unresponsive minimap, unintuitive default keybindings, and unfitting radial menus were highlighted as problems with the mouse and keyboard controls.

The game's campaign received mixed impressions from reviewers. USgamer thought it was great for teaching the mechanics of the game and the progression of difficulty was reasonable. GameSpot thought the highest points of the campaign missions were the sequences that borrowed elements from the main Halo games. Rock, Paper, Shotgun stated that while the campaign was brief, it had good pacing and there was a decent variety of objectives and scenarios. IGN agreed that the campaign missions offered enough variety to prevent them from becoming repetitive. However, overall they were unimpressed by the campaign missions, which they perceived as unambitious in their design. They were also surprised by the frequent bugs, which included crashing and mission events failing to trigger, that they experienced during their playthrough of the campaign on the Xbox One.

Some reviewers enjoyed the game's story but many pointed out that the campaign's conclusion was anticlimactic due to its abrupt and unresolved ending. GameSpot found the plot to be interesting because it explored different parts of the Halo universe. They also felt the integration of the narrative with the campaign missions was effectively implemented through the cutscenes and pre-fight dialogue. However, they remarked that characters were underdeveloped and the story did not contribute much to the main Halo arc. IGN thought Isabel was an endearing and emotive character that bolstered the fear induced by the game's antagonist. They enjoyed Atriox's strong introduction but felt the character became less prominent as the story progressed. Despite believing that there was potential for an interesting backstory with Atriox and the Banished, Eurogamer viewed the motives of the faction in the campaign as being too similar to the Covenant, which consequently made the story feel like it was retreading familiar territory. Reactions towards the campaign cutscenes were overwhelmingly positive, with praise for the high quality production and exceptional animation. While the character dialogue was noted as being cheesy at times, the expressive facial animations kept the cinematics captivating.

PC Gamer complimented the variety of multiplayer game modes available. This sentiment was shared by other reviewers who thought the multiplayer offering was considerably more diverse than what was typically available in most RTS games. Numerous critics regarded Blitz to be the standout multiplayer mode, however they were still apprehensive about its shortcomings. GamesRadar called Blitz the most forward-thinking area of Halo Wars 2, in contrast to other parts of the game which they thought were formulaic. Other writers agreed the mode was an interesting twist on RTS and enjoyed playing it. While Blitz card packs could be earned through playing the game, critics still expressed disappointment about the inclusion of microtransactions for purchasing card packs. A couple of reviewers suspected that winning games in Blitz may be too reliant on the luck of the draw. Consequently, the randomness and card mechanics in the mode were thought to be unsuitable for competitive multiplayer but fitting for the Firefight variant.

=== Accolades ===
Year	Award	Category	Result	Ref.
2016	Game Critics Awards	Best Strategy Game	Nominated	
2016	Gamescom 2016	Best Strategy Game	Nominated	
2017	Gamescom 2017	Best Add-On/Downloadable Content	Nominated	
2017	Develop Awards	Visual Design	Nominated	
2017	Develop Awards	Sound Design	Nominated	
2017	Golden Joystick Awards	Studio of the Year (Creative Assembly)	Nominated	
2017	Golden Joystick Awards	Xbox Game of the Year	Nominated	
2017	Hollywood Music in Media Awards	Original Score - Video Game	Nominated	
2017	The Game Awards 2017	Best Strategy Game	Nominated	
2018	21st Annual D.I.C.E. Awards	Strategy/Simulation Game of the Year	Nominated	
2018	16th Annual Game Audio Network Guild Awards	Sound Design of the Year	Nominated	
2018	16th Annual Game Audio Network Guild Awards	Best Interactive Score	Nominated	
2018	16th Annual Game Audio Network Guild Awards	Best Cinematic/Cutscene Audio	Nominated	
2018	16th Annual Game Audio Network Guild Awards	Best Audio Mix	Nominated	
2018	ASCAP Composers' Choice Awards	2017 ASCAP Video Game Score of the Year	Nominated	
