= Halo: The Fall of Reach =

2001 novel by Eric Nylund

- Author: Eric Nylund
- Language: English
- Series: Halo
- Genre: Military science fiction
- Publisher: Del Rey
- Publication date: October 30, 2001, December 7, 2010 (reprint)
- Publication place: United States
- Media type: Print (Hardcover, Paperback)
- Pages: 352, 416 (reprint)
- ISBN: 0-345-45132-5
- Followed by: Halo: The Flood

Halo: The Fall of Reach is a military science fiction novel by Eric Nylund, set in the Halo universe, and acts as a prelude to Halo: Combat Evolved, the first game in the series. The book was released in October 2001 and is the first Halo novel. It takes place in the 26th century across several planets and locations. The novel details the events which led up to the game and explains the origins of the SPARTAN-II supersoldiers, narrating the story of the series protagonist, the Master Chief.

The Fall of Reach was conceived after Nylund had discussed the possibility of a Halo novel with Microsoft's Franchise Development Group. A "Halo Story Bible" was created to assist Nylund in keeping with Halo canon. The novel was written in seven weeks, Nylund's shortest writing deadline.

The book was well received by critics, who thought it added depth to the plot of the game, but the large number of characters was highlighted as a shortcoming. Going on to sell over one million copies, the success of The Fall of Reach paved the way for further Xbox game novelizations, including another book in the Halo series. William C. Dietz would write the next book, entitled Halo: The Flood. The book was adapted into a comic series entitled Halo: Fall of Reach, released in 2010. The book itself was re-released on December 7, 2010 after the comic book adaptation and contained new content as well as updates to editing mistakes and minor continuity errors introduced following the release of the game Halo: Reach. The novel was also adapted into an animated series that was streamed exclusively through the Halo Channel to coincide with the 2015 release of Halo 5: Guardians. It is also available through DVD and Blu-ray releases.

== Background and writing ==
Eric Nylund had discussed the possibility of a Halo-related novel with Eric Trautmann, a member of Microsoft's Franchise Development Group, before Halo: Combat Evolved was developed, but it was postponed due to legal technicalities. Nylund thought positively of the delay as it "gave [him] a chance to see the game in almost every stage of development before [he] started writing." He wrote the book based on an outline approved by Bungie and the Halo Story Bible, a book containing all information on the characters and universe in which Halo takes place, so that his story would not conflict with other Halo publications. Nylund found it easier to write with the "Bible" available as the details of the universe he was writing in were already established, only minor alterations were made to fit the novel into the universe. A seven-week deadline was established for Nylund to write the book. According to Trautmann, the book was nearly canceled because Bungie was opposed to the idea of the Master Chief having a definite backstory. They eventually relented after Trautmann made them the offer that they let the book be completed and published in exchange for him, Matt Soell, and Brannon Boren completing Combat Evolved's script, which was still "80 percent" unfinished.

== Synopsis ==
=== Setting and characters ===
The Fall of Reach takes place in the Halo universe and spans several decades, beginning in 2517 and describing events up to 2552. In the Halo universe, traveling faster than the speed of light is possible through slipspace, another dimension where special relativity does not apply. This has allowed humans to colonize hundreds of other planets which are controlled by the United Nations Space Command (UNSC). Feeling repressed by the UNSC's heavy-handed rule, some colonies revolt; fearing rebellion will tear the UNSC apart, military leaders approve the SPARTAN-II Program, a secret squad of super soldiers designed to quietly suppress rebellion.

The protagonist of The Fall of Reach is the Spartan soldier Master Chief. Dr. Catherine Halsey, the creator of the SPARTAN-II Project, is introduced alongside then-Lieutenant Jacob Keyes. Franklin Mendez is the trainer of the Spartan II and Spartan III programs, teaching them their physical combat skills while an AI named Déjà teaches them military history and strategy. Cortana, Master Chief's AI companion through much of the series, is also present as Dr. Halsey's aide in the lead-up to the Spartans' mission.

=== Plot ===
The novel opens with the civilian Dr. Catherine Halsey and Lieutenant Jacob Keyes traveling to meet John, a six-year-old boy. Dr. Halsey reveals to Keyes that John is one of 150 children who possess rare genetic markers making them suitable for conscription into the SPARTAN-II program, a secret experiment with the aim of creating super soldiers for the UNSC to quell rebellions. Seventy-five of the children are kidnapped by operatives of the Office of Naval Intelligence and replaced by clones engineered to die of natural causes shortly thereafter. From this point on, the recruits are known only by their first name and a three-digit number. John-117 and the rest of the children are drilled and trained by Franklin Mendez; John demonstrates leadership of his fellow Spartans, leading to his promotion to squad leader. In 2525, the Spartans undergo a series of surgical enhancements which turn them into highly efficient super soldiers - but more than half of the original 75 conscripts are paralyzed or killed. The Spartans are also equipped with powerful MJOLNIR battle armor, designed to respond as quickly as the soldier's thoughts. John-117 is further promoted to Master Chief Petty Officer. The Spartans are highly successful, but they experience a priority shift after a collective of alien races known as the Covenant begin obliterating human colonies, declaring humanity's destruction as the will of their gods. Mendez leaves the group to train the next generation of Spartans as John and his comrades first face the Covenant.

By 2552, the war against the Covenant is going poorly. The technological superiority of the Covenant means that space battles heavily favor the Covenant, and the UNSC can only win engagements by suffering tremendous losses. To prevent the discovery of Earth or other human colonies, Vice Admiral Cole creates the "Cole Protocol", which forbids direct slipspace jumps to Earth or any other population center, and mandates the destruction of a ship before it can be captured by the Covenant. Jacob Keyes, now commander of the destroyer Iroquois, discovers four Covenant ships arriving at the Sigma Octanus System, and single-handedly destroys two Covenant escort frigates and a destroyer in a feat dubbed the Keyes Loop, earning him the rank of captain. The Covenant land ground forces on Sigma Octanus IV, overtaking the primary population centre; Cote d'Azure, in search of an ancient artifact. Despite a costly fight, the humans manage to repel the Covenant, and the Iroquois intercepts a coded Covenant transmission from the surface before the Covenant retreat. The Iroquois heads to Reach, unwittingly bringing a Covenant tracking device with it.

Soon after, Keyes is given the command of the UNSC cruiser Pillar of Autumn for a secret mission: the Spartans are to capture one of the Covenant's religious leaders and barter a truce. Dr. Halsey also introduces John to the artificial intelligence Cortana, who would assist the Spartans by residing in their MJOLNIR armor. Before the mission can begin, however, Reach is attacked by a massive Covenant fleet. John and Cortana reach the Pillar of Autumn, but most of the other Spartans are presumed killed as the Covenant vitrify the surface of Reach, turning the landmasses into glass. Cortana initiates a slipspace course based on the ancient glyphs intercepted by the Covenant at Sigma Octanus; the course takes them to a massive ringworld known as Halo, setting the stage for the events of Halo: Combat Evolved.

== Reception ==
Critical reaction to the book was positive, particularly regarding the depth the book added to the Halo universe. Reviewer Eric Qualls commented that "[it was] interesting to read and give[s] you a much greater understanding" of the universe. Qualls made a positive comparison to Robert A. Heinlein's Starship Troopers regarding the manner of story telling. GameCritics' Brad Gallaway also praised the back-story the book adds and the quality of the story. Fellow reviewer Gene Park noted the descriptions in the book went beyond what was presented in the game, calling them "vibrant and rousing." He also complimented the characters presented in the novel, saying they all "fit nicely into the Halo universe" but some times there were too many characters to remember. Sal Accardo of 3D Action Planet said of the book: "it isn't going to win any Pulitzers anytime soon. It's well written, and a solid page-turner, but it's still basically an action movie presented in book form" but praised the gritty presentation of the Spartans. Don D'Ammasa of the Science Fiction Chronicle called the book "competently written", but stated the plot was "simpleminded".

Though the book originally sold very slowly, it became a Publishers Weekly bestseller. The Fall of Reach would go on to sell more than 100,000 copies by 2003 and a million copies by December 2009. The novel's success convinced Microsoft and Del Rey to pen a three-novel publishing contract for novels based on Xbox games, including another Halo novel. The next entry in the Halo novel franchise would be 2003's Halo: The Flood, written by William C. Dietz. The more human Chief seen in the novel led Bungie to tone down the character model in Halo 2 to make him less an exaggerated robot and more a real person inside a suit.

Stuart Beattie, the screenwriter of Pirates of the Caribbean: The Curse of the Black Pearl, wrote a spec script for a Fall of Reach movie. Beattie, a Halo fan, wrote the script between other projects in the hope that someone would read it and agree to produce the film, but as of May 2008 there were no plans to do so.

In May 2010, Tor announced that the first three Halo novels (not originally published by Tor) would be rereleased with new content and cover art. The Fall of Reach was the first novel to be reissued, with a release date of August 2010.

== Adaptations ==
Marvel Comics adapted the story into a three-part comic series entitled Halo: Fall of Reach, released September 2010. The book was later adapted into a 2015 3D animated miniseries. The series was produced by Sequence, a Vancouver-based animation studio, and released in conjunction with Halo 5: Guardians. The game Halo: Reach largely ignored the canon established in the book. The Paramount+ series loosely adapted the "Fall of Reach" storyline in season 2, with many differences as compared to the novel and Halo: Reach. On November 10, 2026, a full-cast dramatized adaptation of the novel was released as an audiobook, featuring Steve Downes and Jen Taylor reprising their roles as Master Chief and Cortana along with numerous other voice actors.
