= The Halo Graphic Novel =

2006 American graphic novel

- The front cover of The Halo Graphic Novel
- Cover artist: Phil Hale
- Language: English
- Genre: Military science fiction
- Published: 2006 (Marvel Comics)
- Publication place: United States
- Pages: 128
- ISBN: 978-0-7851-2372-9
- OCLC: 68262369

The Halo Graphic Novel is a 2006 graphic novel anthology published by Marvel Comics in partnership with Bungie, set in the universe of the science fiction franchise Halo. The Halo Graphic Novel was the series' first entry into the sequential art medium, and features aspects of the Halo universe which until then had not been discussed or seen in any medium.

The majority of the book is divided into four short stories by different writers and artists from the computer game and comic industries. Each story focuses on different aspects of the Halo universe, revealing stories that are tangential to the main plot of the game. Apart from the stories, the book also contains an extensive art gallery compiled from contributions from Bungie, Marvel and independent sources.

Released on July 19, 2006, The Halo Graphic Novel was well-received, with reviewers noting the cohesiveness of the work as a whole, as well as the diversity of the individual material. The success of the novel led to Marvel announcing a new limited comic series, Halo: Uprising, and other future Halo comic books.

== Background and publication ==
The origins for the Halo Graphic Novel lay in Microsoft and Bungie's exploration of media into which they could expand the Halo video game franchise, with sequential art being an area of particular interest. Microsoft's head of franchise development, Eric Trautmann, assembled a draft comic written by John Ney Rieber and illustrated by Adi Granov. Bungie disliked the comic and Trautmann's team, and asked to choose their own artists and writers instead. Pete Parsons, the studio director of Bungie, wanted to hire Alan Moore and Joe Kubert for the graphic novel, though Trautmann was highly skeptical that such high-profile artists would agree to work on the project.

After unsuccessful negotiation attempts, Bungie artist Lorraine McLees suggested that Bungie finance and edit the novel itself before pursuing a publisher, allowing the studio to maintain control over the content and pursue the venture unencumbered by outside intervention. Comic industry veteran and lead designer Maria Paz Cabardo helped Bungie connect with a "dream team" roster of writers and artists Bungie admired. Bungie was buoyed by their success in approaching those in the medium that they respected and admired, including British comic book artist Simon Bisley and French artist Jean "Moebius" Giraud, and described seeing the team's characters realized by their comic book idols as a morale boost.

Ideas for the stories were drawn from the series' story bible, with Bungie seeing the graphic novel as an opportunity to fill in "fictional gaps" and expand the context of their bigger stories. Executive producer Brian Jarrard explained that "The stories that happen off camera, the parallel events to the arcs that our fans know from the existing mediums, are the stories we really wanted to tell." Jarrard described this shift in focus as an attempt to move away from Halo's central character, Master Chief, and focus on what they believed were the core themes of the series. Although Bungie created the story arcs present in the Halo Graphic Novel, the studio described the importance of providing a framework for each story that the various artists and writers could tell without jeopardizing their own voice. Artist Simon Bisley recalled that outside the direction to make characters look like they do in the games, he was given free rein to visualize the action.

Looking to pitch the novel to publishers, Bungie approached Marvel Comics. Bungie cited Marvel's "passion for Halo" and "reach in the comic and publishing industry" as the main draws to the company. The studio worked alongside Marvel director of development Ruwan Jayatilleke, an early booster of the project, to assist in the distribution and publication of the novel.

== Contents ==
The graphic novel comprises 128 full-color pages and four main stories; each has an introduction by the creators of the work detailing their thoughts about the plot or their experiences adding to the Halo lore. Located after the main body of stories is a 26-page art gallery featuring contributions from Bungie and outside comics artists.

=== The Last Voyage of the Infinite Succor ===
"The Last Voyage of the Infinite Succor" takes place during the video game Halo: Combat Evolved. The Covenant special operations commander Rtas 'Vadumee and his team are sent to answer the distress call from an agricultural ship, Infinite Succor. Believing that it might have been attacked by humans, 'Vadumee and his team instead discover the ship has been infested by the parasitic Flood, who gain the knowledge of those they infect and are trying to use the ship to escape imprisonment. 'Vadumee fights through waves of Flood, including the reanimated remains of his fallen soldiers, plots a course into the system's sun that destroys Infinite Succor and the Flood, and escapes as the sole survivor.

The central goal behind the story was to showcase the true danger posed by the Flood and the inner workings of the Covenant military machine, to dispel the image of the Covenant as enemies that merely sit around for players to shoot. The story was written by Lee Hammock with art provided by Simon Bisley. Hammock described the process of writing the story as a "heady task" since he had to respect Halo fans' knowledge of the characters and canon. These difficulties were mitigated by the knowledge that fans were not as intimately connected to the history of the character of 'Vadumee as they were to the likes of Master Chief; this allowed room to expand 'Vadumee's background in line with canon while permitting the writer to "bring something new to the table".

=== Armor Testing ===
"Armor Testing" takes place shortly before the opening of the game Halo 2, as the United Nations Space Command field-tests a new version of supersoldier powered armor in a series of exercises. A lone Spartan puts the armor through its paces by dropping from Earth's atmosphere and engaging in a mock battle against UNSC special forces. The Spartan is revealed to be a woman, Maria-062, who has come out of retirement as a special favor to test the new equipment before it is sent to the Master Chief during the events of the game.

The concept of the story was inspired by the book Skunk Works, Ben Rich's memoir of the testing of military projects at Lockheed. Highlighting the rigorous experimentation of the SPARTAN equipment before its use by the Master Chief was an idea that Bungie originally wanted to pursue at the beginning of Halo 2, but instead they opted to communicate this background information at a later time. "Armor Testing" was written by Jay Faerber with art by W. Andrew Robinson and Ed Lee.

=== Breaking Quarantine ===
"Breaking Quarantine" also deals with the Flood outbreak that occurs during Halo: Combat Evolved. While "The Last Voyage" tells the story from the Covenant perspective, "Breaking Quarantine" highlights the escape of the human soldier Avery Johnson from the Flood. Johnson is a minor character in Halo: Combat Evolved who becomes an important character in the following two games; while the novel Halo: First Strike explains that Johnson resists Flood infestation due to a medical condition, no other story up to that point explained how Johnson escapes. "Breaking Quarantine" is an example of Bungie's attempts to expand the story arcs of secondary characters that would have no opportunity to be explained in the main storyline. Unlike the other stories, "Breaking Quarantine" contains no dialogue, only weapon sound effects, which are rendered in Japanese. Both art and story were provided by Tsutomu Nihei, a manga artist and architect who based his illustrations on the structures found within the game.

=== Second Sunrise over New Mombasa ===
During Halo 2, the Covenant launch a direct attack on Earth, striking the fictional city of New Mombasa in Kenya. The story is told through the eyes of a reporter in Mombasa who creates propaganda for the UNSC. When the Covenant invade the city, the reporter and fellow citizens take to its defense, until they are forced to flee as the city faces ruin.

Bungie described "Second Sunrise" as an attempt to put a human face on the conflict by illustrating the effects of war on the common citizen. The story was written by Brett Lewis with art provided by Jean "Moebius" Giraud. Giraud explained that his son's enjoyment of the game series ultimately compelled him to accept an invitation to contribute his art, as he had previously never played the games.

== Release ==
The Halo Graphic Novel was released on July 19, 2006, in a dust jacketed hardcover format. A few promotional pieces were released beforehand, including a sixteen-page preview released May 31, which contained Bungie's introductions to each story along with short excerpts. A full-color poster of the book's cover was released on June 28. Dark Horse Comics released a new edition of the graphic novel in 2021.

== Reception ==
Critical reaction to the graphic novel was generally positive. Publishers Weekly wrote that Halo newcomers and fans would find appealing content in the book, with the main drawback being that a reader might want the depth of a full-length graphic novel. IGN's Hilary Goldstein wrote that they would have sacrificed the gallery pages as a tradeoff for longer stories. UGO's Wayne Oliveri praised the novel's wealth of contributions from recognized artists and the strength of the material in fleshing out the Halo universe as the work's greatest strength. Mike Deeley of Comics Bulletin lauded the book for the diverse range of storytelling and art styles that lent the Halo Graphic Novel the feel of an anthology yet still retained a cohesive whole. GameTrailers praised Bungie for choosing to focus on characters other than Master Chief. IGN and GameTrailers thought the weakest story was "Armor Testing" as it had the least emotional impact.

The art was generally praised, with The Post-Standard's review recommending the graphic novel on the basis of the art alone. Tsutomu Nihei's work on Breaking Quarantine received particular attention for its vivid imagery and its focus on visual storytelling in lieu of any dialogue.

Upon release, Publishers Weekly called the Halo Graphic Novel a "rare hit" for the games-to-comics genre, debuting at number two on both the Nielsen BookScan and Diamond sales charts. Marvel reported they expected to print 100,000 copies by the end of the year, and the comic continued to be one of the top-selling graphic novels months after its debut. In late 2007, the Pittsburgh Tribune-Review called it Marvel's best-selling graphic novel. The success of the novel led Marvel Comics and Bungie to announce a four-issue monthly Halo comic series at San Diego Comic-Con in 2006 called Halo: Uprising. Following delays, the first issue of the limited series was released on August 22, 2007.
