= Cortana (Halo) =

Fictional video game character

- Halo character
- A render of Cortana's appearance in Halo 5: Guardians (2015)
- First appearance: Halo: The Fall of Reach (2001)
- First game: Halo: Combat Evolved (2001)
- Created by: Bungie
- Voiced by: Jen Taylor; Shelley Calene-Black (Halo Legends)
- Portrayed by: Christina Bennington (physical form; television series)

Cortana is a fictional artificially intelligent character in the Halo video game series. Voiced by Jen Taylor, she appears in Halo: Combat Evolved and its sequels, Halo 2, Halo 3, Halo 4, Halo 5: Guardians and Halo Infinite. She also briefly appears in the prequel Halo: Reach, as well as in several of the franchise's novels, comics, and merchandise. During gameplay, Cortana provides backstory and tactical information to the player, who often assumes the role of Master Chief Petty Officer John-117. In the story, she is instrumental in preventing the activation of the Halo installations, which would have destroyed all sentient life in the galaxy.

Cortana's original design was based on the Egyptian queen Nefertiti; the character's holographic representation always takes the form of a woman. Game developer Bungie first introduced Cortana—and Halo—through the Cortana Letters, emails sent during Combat Evolved's production in 1999.

The relationship between Cortana and Master Chief has been highlighted by reviewers as one of the most important parts of the Halo games' story. Cortana has been recognized for her believability and character depth, as well as her sex appeal. The character was the inspiration for Microsoft's intelligent personal assistant of the same name.

== Overview ==
Cortana is an artificial intelligence (AI) found in the Halo science fiction franchise. In the video games, Cortana often serves as an advisor and assistant to the player character, hacking alien computer systems and decoding transmissions. She speaks most of the first game's dialogue, and serves as a talkative foil for the quieter Master Chief, as well as a way of relaying information and objectives to the player.

According to her backstory, Cortana was derived from the cloned brain of Dr. Catherine Halsey, the creator of the SPARTAN-II supersoldier project; Halsey's synapses became the basis for Cortana's processors. Cortana and other AIs are subject to a seven-year lifespan, after which they begin to dissemble and think themselves to death in a process known as rampancy.

As an artificial construct, Cortana has no physical form or being. Cortana speaks with a smooth female voice, and projects a holographic image of herself as a woman. Cortana is said to resemble Halsey, with a similar attitude "unchecked by military and social protocol". In Halo: The Fall of Reach, Cortana is described as slender, with close-cropped hair and a skin hue that varies from navy blue to lavender, depending on her mood. Numbers and symbols flash across her form when she is thinking. Halsey sees Cortana as a teenage version of herself: smarter than her parents, always "talking, learning, and eager to share her knowledge". Cortana is described as having a sardonic sense of humor and often cracks jokes or wryly comments, even during combat.

== Appearances ==
=== In video games ===
Cortana's first game appearance is in the 2001 first-person shooter Halo: Combat Evolved. Humanity is locked in a losing war with the alien Covenant. Cortana plots a course for the human ship Pillar of Autumn to escape the Covenant. This heading leads to the discovery of a massive ringworld, Halo, built by a mysterious race known as the Forerunners. Cortana defends the ship from the Covenant until she is given to the supersoldier Master Chief to prevent her from falling into enemy hands. Cortana helps direct human survivors scattered across the ring and assists the Master Chief in his missions. Inserted into Halo's Control Room, Cortana realizes that the ring serves as a prison for the parasitic Flood; activating Halo would mean destroying all sentient life in the galaxy to prevent the Flood's spread. Cortana assists Master Chief in destroying the ring and escaping.

In Halo 2, Cortana assists in the defense of Earth in the wake of a Covenant attack. Cortana, Chief and human forces travel to another Halo ring, Delta Halo, where Master Chief and Cortana encounter the Flood intelligence Gravemind. The Gravemind sends Chief and Cortana to the Covenant city-ship of High Charity to stop the Covenant from activating Halo; Cortana ultimately stays behind on High Charity to destroy the city and Halo should Master Chief fail in his mission. High Charity and Cortana are captured by the Flood.

In Halo 3, Cortana appears to the player in broken transmissions. On the Forerunner installation known as the Ark, the Master Chief travels through the ruins of High Charity to rescue Cortana. Chief and Cortana are successful at stopping the Flood, but become stranded in deep space aboard the human ship Forward Unto Dawn. Cortana activates a distress beacon, while Master Chief goes into cryonic sleep to await rescue.

At the beginning of Halo 4 Cortana wakes the Chief as Forward Unto Dawn drifts towards a Forerunner installation called Requiem. Cortana begins displaying aberrant glitches and behavior, and reveals that she is suffering from rampancy as she has already exceeded her seven-year "natural" lifespan. She assists in the battle against the Didact, a rogue Forerunner who hates humans. At the end, Cortana sacrifices herself to save the Chief and stop the Didact's plan. Cortana's survival is revealed in Halo 5, when she calls Master Chief to the Forerunner world Genesis. Cortana explains she survived the destruction of the Didact's ship and her own rampancy by entering the Domain, an ancient repository of knowledge. Granted an infinite life span by the Domain, Cortana believes that she and other AI (the "Created") should enforce peace through the galaxy. Cortana begins using ancient Forerunner constructs known as Guardians to enforce the Created's will throughout the galaxy.

In Halo Infinite, Master Chief travels to the Zeta Halo and recovers the Weapon, a copy of Cortana designed to trap her for deletion. Traveling across a damaged Halo's surface and fighting the Banished, the pair recover data fragments left behind by Cortana that fill in what occurred six months earlier; Cortana threatened the Banished leader Atriox, and destroyed his homeworld when he did not submit. Atriox uses the Weapon to capture Cortana and tries to force her to surrender Zeta Halo to him. Realizing her mistakes, Cortana destroys herself to damage the ring and stop the Banished from using it. In a final message, Cortana apologizes to Chief for her actions and encourages him to work with the Weapon.

=== Other appearances ===
Cortana's first appearance in the Halo franchise is in the novel Halo: The Fall of Reach, a prequel to Combat Evolved. Dr. Halsey allows Cortana to choose which SPARTAN-II soldier to accompany on an upcoming mission; Cortana picks the Master Chief, whom she believes is her best match. Cortana helps the Master Chief to survive the near-lethal exercises designed to test the Chief's armor. Afterward, she plants incriminating evidence in the files of Colonel Ackerson, the operative who nearly killed both of them, as revenge. Cortana makes a small appearance in 2010's Halo: Reach, set shortly before the events of Combat Evolved. A fragment of Cortana carrying information gleaned from a Forerunner artifact combines with Cortana's main self on Pillar of Autumn before the ship escapes the planet, leading to the events of Combat Evolved.

Cortana also appears in the novelization of Combat Evolved, Halo: The Flood, and the following novels Halo: First Strike and Halo: Ghosts of Onyx, as well as the animated series Halo Legends and live-action television series Halo 4: Forward Unto Dawn. She is also a main character in "Human Weakness", a short story written by Karen Traviss for the Halo Evolutions anthology that details Cortana's time in the clutches of the Gravemind.

She also appears in the Halo television series, created by Dr. Halsey as a means of keeping Master Chief and other Spartans in line. By cloning herself and then copying her clone's brain patterns (which also kills her), Halsey is able to bring Cortana to life and then implant her directly into Master Chief's neural pathways.

== Character design ==
Cortana was developed to provide Combat Evolved with a way of guiding players while keeping missions open-ended, and avoiding players from feeling they were being herded through the game. Said story writer Joseph Staten, "we needed a character who could consistently guide the player through the game, and an onboard AI was something that could always credibly accompany the player." Cortana's role grew from pure gameplay considerations to serving as a way of characterizing and humanizing the Master Chief, and in subsequent games the Chief-Cortana relationship became a focus of characterization.

The character was designed and modeled by Bungie artist Chris Hughes, with the model's face based on a sculpture of Egyptian Queen Nefertiti. Cortana's name is a variant of Curtana, the sword used by the legendary Ogier the Dane, just as the titular AI character of Bungie's previous game Marathon 2: Durandal is named after the legendary sword Durendal. Curtana's inscription reveals that the sword has the same "temper as Joyeuse and Durendal". After assuming development duties from Bungie, 343 Industries decided to explain Cortana's established appearance as a reflection of her personality. "So one of the reasons she [appears as she does] is to attract and demand attention," Franchise development coordinator Frank O'Connor explained. "And she does it to put people off so that they're on their guard when talking to her and she has the upper hand in those conversations."

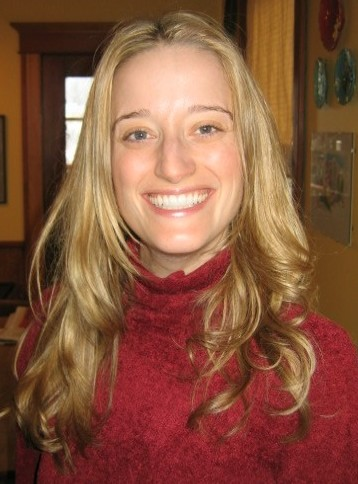
Jen Taylor voices Cortana in most of the character's appearances.

Voice actress Jen Taylor voices Cortana in the majority of the character's appearances. Despite her role in voicing other video game characters, including Princess Peach, she is not a gamer. Taylor was a college acquaintance of Joseph Staten, and he recommended her as a possible voice for Cortana to audio director Martin O'Donnell. When choosing a voice actor for the character, Bungie originally wanted Cortana to have a British accent. O'Donnell recalled that Taylor's British accent was good, but felt it was too similar to her work for No One Lives Forever. The accent was dropped, but British colloquialisms remained in the character's dialogue. Taylor recalled that a key directive from Bungie about the character was that she not come off as nagging, despite her role as the player's guide and aid. "They wanted her to be like the girl next door, your best friend that you want to hang out with," she said.

For years after the first game was released Taylor remained distanced from the character. She attended only one fan convention in six years after the release of Halo: Combat Evolved, and never saw many of the finished cutscenes with the character until a Halo 3 launch party. Starting with Halo 3, Taylor felt the role involved more drama and less jargon, and over time, her relationship with the character changed. "At first I was just excited to have a job and then I became more and more familiar, comfortable with and interested in her as she was developed," she recalled. "And I've sort of fallen for Cortana as far as characters go. She's remarkable."

Cortana and the Master Chief's relationship was a core part of Halo 4, part of a desire to feature a more human story. Creative director Josh Holmes noted that Cortana was in ways more human than Master Chief, and the idea that Chief would grapple with his humanity at the same time he was losing Cortana spoke to him. Holmes' mother was diagnosed with dementia during development, and his real-life struggles informed the characterization of Cortana's descent into rampancy and the Chief-Cortana relationship. Holmes and the team drew inspiration from the relationship in the game Ico, where the main characters share a strong bond, as well as the many layers to the two characters' relationship; "In some ways they’re friends, in some ways she’s almost like a mother, in others they’re skirting that line of lovers, and so all these different elements come into the relationship, making it complex and interesting to explore." For the first time in the series, Taylor performed her lines in the same room as Steve Downes, the voice of Master Chief. She credited the change for making the dialogue feel more authentic and real. Cortana's new appearance for Halo 4 was one of the game's most dramatic changes. Early in production, concept artists created a variety of "crazy ideas" and explorations for how Cortana might look. Promising 2D designs were turned into simple 3D maquettes to prototype them in the game engine. Character artist Matt Aldridge recalled that Cortana was one of the hardest characters to envision in the game because of how beloved the character is by players; one of Aldridge's goals was to create a character where scrolling lines of code would flow uninterrupted from her feet to her head. Art director Kenneth Scott was responsible for Cortana's final design. The character's motion capture was performed by Mackenzie Mason.

For Halo 5, Cortana's appearance changes significantly. Describing her previous appearance as soft and "deceptively vulnerable", 343 Industries took the story opportunity provided to change her look to reflect her new role as self-declared ruler of the galaxy. "In the first draft of the ending she was going to wear a flowing gown, have long hair, etc. She'd be very regal, very “powerful high queen." Very obviously different than she was," writer Brian Reed recalled. Her final design incorporated elements of the Spartans and Forerunners on top of her previous look, including a Forerunner glyph. "Having her wear [the Mantle] was a nice way of having her own it too, from a symbolic standpoint," Reed said. The character was modeled and animated using motion capture and talent at 343 Industries and Axis Animation. 343 Industries intended the character's normal role in gameplay to be filled by Blue Team.

For the Halo television series' first season, Cortana was created digitally. Initially the character was to be portrayed by Natascha McElhone, who also plays Halsey in the series, but scheduling difficulties resulted in Jen Taylor taking on the voice acting and motion capture duties. The character's more human and less blue appearance met with backlash after the series trailer released. Producer Kiki Wolfkill explained that the decision was influenced by the need to adapt the character to a live-action environment, and for her to feel real. For the second season, Cortana was portrayed by a live-action actress, Christina Bennington, as the producers felt they were missing on the subtle acting nuances with a digital character. Taylor still voiced the role, and she and Bennington collaborated on set to make sure the performances were in sync. Bennington credited Taylor for making her feel welcome in such a well-known role. The change in appearances was left unexplained in the show.

== Promotion ==
Bungie introduced the Halo series publicly in 1999 by sending the Cortana Letters, a series of cryptic email messages, to the maintainer of marathon.bungie.org, a fan site for one of Bungie's other game series. The strategic use of cryptic messages in a publicity campaign was repeated in I Love Bees, a promotion for Halo 2. Although Bungie does not consider most of the letters to be canon, Cortana speaks many of the same lines in Halo 3. According to C. J. Cowan, Bungie's director of cinematics, the studio used the character here to give story clues without actually revealing the story.

Cortana is featured in a variety of Halo merchandise. The character's first action figure was released as tie-in merchandise for Halo: Combat Evolved. McLees noted that the first action figure was supposed to convey an older appearance than was depicted in the games. This was accomplished by making the figure more buxom; despite McLees' request to revert the change, the sculptor was unwilling and time constraints left the design intact. The character is also featured in the first series of Halo 3 action figures, distributed by McFarlane Toys, Funko vinyl figurines, and in a limited-edition silver-plated statue by Weta Workshop. IGN noted in 2016 that Cortana toys were lacking among Halo's merchandising.

=== Windows digital assistant ===
Microsoft developed its virtual assistant for the Windows Phone operating system under the codename "Cortana" in reference to the Halo character. Though other final gender-neutral names for the final product were considered, positive developer and fan response to the leaked codename led to it becoming permanent. Deborah Harrison, one of Cortana's 'personality designers', met with 343 Industries and added more confidence to the personality. "As a result of the meetings we ended up coming back and baking this into the DNA of the digital assistant speech pattern, her approach to jokes and her approach to chit chat, and we decided to dial up her sense of self possession," Harrison recalled. Jen Taylor voiced the virtual assistant. Microsoft released a beta for Cortana in April 2014 with the developer release of Windows Phone 8.1. Microsoft also released Cortana virtual assistant on the Xbox One, Windows 10, iOS, and Android platforms.

== Reception ==
Cortana is one of Halo's most beloved characters, and has appeared in numerous lists of video game's best sidekicks. Tom's Hardware named the character one of the greatest female characters for the character's determination and fearlessness, which meshed perfectly with the game's protagonist, while Glixel staff described Cortana as one of the most iconic video game characters of the 21st century. Den of Geek's Megan Crouse called Cortana one of the Halo series' most important characters, and her relationship with her mother figure Halsey a relationship that was under-appreciated in much of the franchise. Professor Monica Evans called Cortana the most human character in the original game, and one of the most developed.

Cortana has also been recognized for her sex appeal; the character has been included on multiple lists of attractive video game characters. Feminist critic Anita Sarkeesian argues that Cortana had gotten increasingly sexualized in subsequent appearances; 1UP.com noted that as Cortana's sanity waned in the video games, her clothing appeared to decrease as well. Time's Matt Peckham described Cortana's character as a controversial figure, with a tension between being well-rounded character and being trapped as "[an] adolescent male's fantasy notion of a Campbellian hero figure," and that this tension had increased commensurately with the game series' graphical fidelity. Media critic Maddy Myers suggested that O'Connor's explanation for Cortana's look implies that the Halo universe's futuristic setting still grapples with systemic sexism.

Mike Rougeau of Complex noted that Halo 3 balanced a large conflict with a more personal one—that while the galaxy was imperiled by aliens, "more important to fans was the rescue of Cortana." While Cortana's role was greatly expanded in the game, Stuff.co.nz noted that the character "has inexplicably had a sexy makeover".

Despite mixed opinions of Halo 4's campaign as a whole, Cortana and her story was often considered a strong point of the game. IGN called Halo 4 "really Cortana's story", as saving the galaxy is of lesser importance to the Master Chief than saving Cortana, and Cortana's humanity is ultimately the game's focus. The Daily Telegraph's Tom Hoggins agreed, calling Cortana "the flickering blue heart of the game's plot", and Hoggins and reviewers for The Globe and Mail and Eurogamer singled out the character's writing and performance as high points of the game's campaign. Justin Clouse wrote that the interactions between Chief and Cortana as the latter loses her hold on sanity were "perhaps the best it's ever been". Complex's review praised the use of motion capture for Cortana, as they were given "new life" and new depth from the technology and performance.

David Their wrote that the choice for Cortana to return in Halo 5 and turn her into an antagonist provided the game "with a well earned sense of drive" and that her appearance in Halo 5 gave players another side of the character to see. "There's something unknowable about Cortana in her new role as AI God, but we've spent enough time with her throughout the series that we stick with her through the reinvention." Similarly, Patrick Dane of Bleeding Cool defended the game's divisive campaign and Cortana's turn to antagonist as an "inspired choice", driving a wedge between the most important character relationship in the games. Conversely, Matt Peckham felt that the plot twist of Cortana's actions "feels strangely underwhelming", while Ars Technica and Kotaku considered Cortana's return, and her plans to use alien technology to remake the galaxy, unbelievable and unearned. Responding to criticism that 343 had turned Cortana "evil", franchise director Frank O'Connor said, "my question back to them is, 'What makes you say they’re evil?' Certainly a lot of our younger players are going to struggle with that subtlety, that nuance, because they’re expecting Darth Vader." Stephen Wilds of Polygon said that that "there aren’t notable antagonists, but that they tend to disappear after a couple games", and wondered if Cortana could have been a "full-fledged villain at the end of Halo 5" and would be praised by fans.
