= Halo Array =

Fictional ringworlds in the Halo franchise

- Halo location
- The Halo Array gathered around the Ark, as depicted in a terminal cinematic from Halo: Combat Evolved Anniversary (2011)
- First appearance: Halo: The Fall of Reach (2001)
- Created by: Bungie
- Genre: Science fiction

In-universe information
- Type: Ring-shaped megastructures; superweapons
- Location: Milky Way

The Halo Array is a network of fictional ring-shaped megastructures and superweapons in the Halo science-fiction franchise. Known individually as Halos, the structures have habitable inner surfaces. In the series' fiction, the ancient Forerunners built them to combat the Flood, a parasitic life form, by destroying the sentient life on which it feeds. The alien Covenant worship the rings and mistakenly believe that activating them will bring salvation. The original ring, Installation 04, is the setting of much of Halo: Combat Evolved (2001). Other rings appear in subsequent games, including Halo 2 (2004) and Halo Infinite (2021).

Bungie developed the ring setting after considering a planet and a Dyson sphere for Combat Evolved. Its developers compared the design with Larry Niven's Ringworld and Iain M. Banks's Orbitals. Retrospectives have praised the original ring's sense of place, scale and contrast between natural scenery and artificial construction. Scholarly work has examined the Covenant's worship of the rings and their destructive purpose, while science writers have considered their physical plausibility.

== Concept and development ==
=== Original design ===
Early versions of Halo took place on a planet named Solipsis. The setting subsequently became a Dyson sphere and then a ring. The project used the working title Monkey Nuts, which became Blam! because Bungie co-founder Jason Jones was uncomfortable telling his mother the original name. Other proposed titles included The Crystal Palace, Hard Vacuum, Star Maker, Star Shield and The Santa Machine.

Environment artist Paul Russel proposed Project: Halo after the setting had changed into a ring. Jones preferred Red Shift, and some team members worried that Halo sounded religious or did not suggest an action game. The team nevertheless adopted the name. The game was named for its ring-shaped setting.

In a 2000 interview, Jones distinguished the setting from Niven's Ringworld: the latter surrounds a star, whereas Halo is a much smaller satellite of a gas giant. He considered it structurally closer to Banks's Orbitals. Jones said that Bungie wanted a setting with a strong dramatic presence and regarded the ring as one of the story's main characters. Bungie's Frank O'Connor subsequently acknowledged the team's science-fiction influences but rejected the suggestion that it had copied Niven's setting wholesale. He said that the team considered a ringworld an appealing structure for the Forerunners to have built.

Art director Marcus Lehto also described the ring as a character. He recalled that the team initially knew its function and approximate scale, and developed its appearance as they worked out the Forerunners' architectural style. Paintings by Craig Mullins depicted the ring intact, damaged and breaking apart; the team derived the exterior model's surface textures from them. Lehto conceived the surface structures as entrances to much larger underground machinery. Russel said that the architectural style developed through his work on the underground spaces in "The Silent Cartographer".

Artist Steve Abeyta said that the overhead ring gave the otherwise familiar landscape an alien appearance: players could see it whenever they were outdoors. A Retro Gamer retrospective traced the terrain to the Pacific Northwest, where Bungie developed the game. Lehto told the magazine that he wanted players to roam and explore the equivalent of a large national park.

The original ring was to contain wildlife, including creatures resembling dinosaurs and mammals. An early version included rideable creatures called Blind Wolves. Bungie removed the animals because of time constraints, performance problems and difficulties with their behaviour, particularly during combat. The studio also considered that another population of creatures would diminish the impact of encountering the Flood. Bungie later wrote that removing the animals had unintentionally made the landscape seem more abandoned and mysterious.

=== Later games ===
During development of Halo Infinite, gameplay director Troy Mashburn cited "The Silent Cartographer" as a model for allowing players to choose routes and approaches to combat across a larger environment. In a March 2021 presentation, the developers said that the ring itself would be a three-dimensional model capable of eclipsing the sun. They also described weather systems and non-hostile wildlife, including small animals described as "space gophers" and bioluminescent creatures.

For Halo: Campaign Evolved (2026), art directors Chris Matthews and Donnie Taylor reviewed the original game and Halo: Combat Evolved Anniversary. Taylor said that their approach favoured darker environments closer to the mood he associated with the original. Matthews said that the remake used the same ring model in its menu and cinematics for visual consistency. He wanted the menu to convey the ring's scale and encourage a sense of adventure and mystery.

== Characteristics and depiction ==
In the series' fiction, the Halo Array consists of rings built by the Forerunners as weapons against the Flood. The rings have metallic exteriors and habitable inner surfaces. Their terrain includes mountains, forests, lakes and rivers. In Combat Evolved, Installation 04 orbits the gas giant Threshold. The Forerunners left the rings under the care of artificial intelligences called monitors, including 343 Guilty Spark who is responsible for Installation 04. The rings contain surviving Flood, and their weapons work by killing the organisms on which the parasite feeds. The Covenant instead believe that activating these "Sacred Rings" will begin a "Great Journey".

The original ring appears in the novel Halo: The Fall of Reach (2001), which was published before the release of Combat Evolved. In Combat Evolved, human survivors of the spaceship Pillar of Autumn land on Installation 04 while fighting the Covenant. The Flood escape confinement during the fighting, and Guilty Spark tries to persuade Master Chief to activate the ring. After Cortana warns him of the weapon's effect, Master Chief destroys the ring by blowing up the Pillar of Autumn. A surviving fragment of Installation 04 is investigated in the live-action series Halo: Nightfall.

Halo 2 introduces a second ring, which the Covenant also attempt to activate. The Arbiter, a Covenant warrior, learns that the rings are weapons and joins the humans against the Covenant leadership. They prevent the ring from firing. The interrupted activation leaves the remaining installations on emergency standby. The rings can be fired collectively from another Forerunner installation, the Ark.

In Halo 3 (2007), the humans and their allies follow the Covenant through a portal on Earth to the Ark. There, they again stop the activation of the Array. The Ark also builds rings, and begins constructing a replacement for Installation 04 after its destruction. Master Chief activates this unfinished replacement to kill the Flood at the Ark, destroying the ring in the process.

The Ark returns as a setting in Halo Wars 2, in which the crew of the human ship Spirit of Fire encounters the Banished, an alien force that broke away from the Covenant.

Halo Infinite takes place on Zeta Halo, a partially destroyed ring contested by Master Chief and the Banished.

== Reception and analysis ==
=== Setting and visual design ===
Before Combat Evolved was released, Kieron Gillen described the reversal of an ordinary horizon in PC Gamer: the ground curved upwards instead of downwards, with the ring visible as an arch across the sky. In the version he saw, this arch used pre-rendered imagery rather than a three-dimensional object in the game world. In a retrospective feature for Game Informer, Matt Miller regarded the original game's sense of place as one of its principal contributions. He contrasted the trees, grass and ocean encountered after the opening spaceship sequence with the ruins and enclosed metallic spaces he had expected from science-fiction games. The overhead ring, he wrote, made this terrain feel both familiar and alien.

Oli Welsh of Eurogamer wrote that the sight of the ring curving beside the gas giant Threshold made its enormous scale comprehensible. He found the Earthlike terrain and quiet soundscape peaceful despite the fighting. To Welsh, the austere Forerunner structures suggested machinery beneath the surface. Welsh preferred the original game's relatively simple presentation to the more detailed graphics of Anniversary.

In The Meaning of Video Games, Steven E. Jones described the landscape at the start of the second mission as sublime, citing the overhead ring, mountains and waterfall. Jones contrasted the view with Cortana's immediate warning of approaching enemies: players who linger to admire the scenery risk being killed.

Reviewing Infinite, Natalie Clayton of PC Gamer praised the appearance of Zeta Halo's forests and Forerunner structures, including the overhead ring's interaction with sunlight. She argued that confining the story to one part of the ring restricted its environmental variety. The repeated Pacific Northwest terrain, she wrote, made the missions less distinctive than those in earlier games.

Lehto criticised the proportions and polished surface of the ring model in the Campaign Evolved menu. He said it looked newly built, whereas the ring should appear ancient, massive and sinister. In his review of Campaign Evolved, Ian Dean of Creative Bloq praised the transition from spaceship corridors to the ring's open landscape. He wrote that the updated lighting and more detailed environments retained the mood of familiar locations.

=== Academic interpretations ===
Gerald Voorhees, writing in Game Studies, compared the threat posed by the rings in Halo 2 with the Bush administration's apocalyptic rhetoric about the war on terror. He argued that the Covenant's belief that activation will bring salvation links religious fundamentalism with galactic destruction. In his reading, the game places players in a war for survival against an enemy driven by religious ideology.

Jarell Paulissen of Religions suggested that the Ark could refer either to Noah's Ark or to the Ark of the Covenant. He compared the Array's destruction of life with the biblical flood and the prospect of a new beginning. His second reading concerned the Ark of the Covenant's status as a sacred object and a weapon. Paulissen also suggested that the Covenant's reverence for the Forerunners might amount to worship of their technology. He contrasted their technological sophistication with their refusal to accept the rings' actual purpose.

In Economic Science Fictions, Mark R. Johnson classified the Halo rings, the Ark and shield worlds as products of a post-scarcity society. In his interpretation, the Forerunners' ability to manipulate matter removes ordinary constraints of money, resources and labour. Johnson also argued that games allow players to explore megastructures rather than rely on an author's descriptions or a filmmaker's chosen shots. He cited the rings' caves, rivers and individual trees as examples of the detail such environments can contain.

=== Scientific analysis ===
The five Lagrangian points in a two-body system. For Halo, the gas giant is the yellow circle, the lone moon is the blue circle, and the ringworld is positioned at L_{1}.

In "Halo Science 101", planetary scientist Kevin R. Grazier examined the rings as hypothetical habitats. He modelled a steel structure with an exotic protective sheath and interpreted apparent windows and docking ports as evidence of hollow spaces inside it. Using a radius of 5,000 km (3,100 mi), he calculated that a ring would need to rotate approximately once every 75 minutes to produce Earthlike apparent gravity. He considered effects on falling water, projectiles and spacecraft landings, and the need for taller rim walls to retain the atmosphere.

Grazier proposed a position near the L1 Lagrange point between Threshold and its moon Basis, with orbital corrections to maintain it. He also considered impact damage and radiation near a gas giant, suggesting electrical cables around the ring to generate a protective magnetic field. In a summary of Grazier's work, Paulissen compared the habitats with the proposed Bishop Ring.

Science journalist Robin George Andrews interviewed planetary scientists Caitlin Ahrens and Craig Hardgrove about the rings' landscapes. Ahrens questioned how the structure could support mountains and how its topography would survive erosion without geological processes to rebuild it. Hardgrove questioned the coexistence of different climates and the handling of snowmelt. Ahrens said that the ring's unusual shape gave players a different experience of exploration. Hardgrove, who had consulted for Bungie on Destiny, associated such fictional worlds with his interest in planetary exploration.
