= Flood (Halo) =

Fictional parasitic alien

Protagonist Master Chief (left) fighting Flood in Halo: Combat Evolved (2001)

The Flood is a fictional parasitic alien lifeform featured in the Halo multimedia franchise. First introduced in the 2001 video game Halo: Combat Evolved, it returns in later entries in the series such as Halo 2, Halo 3, and Halo Wars. The Flood is driven by a desire to infect any sentient life of sufficient size; Flood-infected creatures, also called Flood, in turn can infect other hosts. The parasite is depicted as such a threat that the ancient Forerunners constructed artificial ringworld superweapons known as Halos to contain it and, as a last resort, to kill all sentient life in the galaxy in an effort to stop the Flood's spread by starving it.

The Flood's design and fiction were led by Bungie artist Robert McLees, who started from unused concepts from earlier Bungie games and was inspired by personal experiences. The setting of the first game, the ringworld Halo, was stripped of many of its large creatures in order to make the Flood's surprise appearance midway through the game more startling. Bungie environment artist Vic DeLeon spent six months of pre-production time refining the Flood's fleshy aesthetic and designing the organic interiors of Flood-infested spaceships for Halo 3.

The player's discovery of the Flood in Halo: Combat Evolved is a major plot twist, and was one of the surprises reviewers noted positively. The Flood's return in Halo 2 and Halo 3 was less enthusiastically praised. Reaction to the Flood itself has been positive, being consistently placed amongst the greatest video game villains by video game magazines.

== Development ==
Concept art of a Flood combat form. The left hand has been replaced with tentacles, and the infection form's sensory apparatus sprout where the head once was.

The Flood is depicted as a parasitic organism that infects any sentient life of sufficient size. Small, bulbous infection forms seek out suitable hosts, living or dead, burrowing into the target and bringing it under Flood control. Depending on the size or condition of the body, the infection form mutates the hapless host into various specialized forms in the continual drive for more food. Larger hosts are turned into forms for combat, growing long whip-like tentacles, while mangled and disused hosts are turned into incubators for more infection forms. The Flood also creates forms known as "key minds" to coordinate the Flood; these include the apex of Flood evolution, known as "Graveminds".

The Flood was added early in Bungie's development of the 2001 video game Halo: Combat Evolved. A design for one Flood form appeared as early as 1997. Commenting upon the inception of the Flood, Bungie staff member Chris Butcher noted that "the idea behind the Flood as the forgotten peril that ended a galaxy-spanning empire is a pretty fundamental tenet of good sci-fi. Yeah, and bad sci-fi too." One inspiration was Christopher Rowley's The Vang series. Early design for the Flood was done by Bungie artist and writer Robert McLees, who considers himself "the architect" of the Flood; the Flood's roots are reflected in concept art of a "fungal zombie" that McLees did for the earlier Bungie game Marathon 2: Durandal. McLees also did all the early concept art for the Flood.

Based on the behavior of viruses and certain bacteria, the Flood was intended to be "disgusting and nasty"; McLees modeled one Flood form off the memory of his cousin's infected thumb, while the silhouette of the skittering infection forms came from a more innocuous source—an airborne palm tree from one of the Little Golden Books McLees had read as a child. The larger creatures were constructed from the corpses and bodies of former combatants, so the artists had to make sure the Flood soldiers were recognizable while changing their silhouette enough to differentiate them from the uninfected. Many concepts and ideas were discarded due to time constraints—initially, the Flood was intended to convert any species of the alien Covenant into soldiers. "We didn't have the resources to make it happen," McLees recalled, so they modified the game's fiction to suggest that some Covenant were too small or too frail to serve as combat troops. The technical inability to create different Flood forms procedurally informed the game's fiction that the Flood had optimized their host forms over years of trial and error, creating standardized templates that the developers used to obfuscate the repeated use of similar models. Likewise, the Flood enemy intelligence was intended to be as complicated as that of the other enemy faction in the game, but full implementation was cut for time. The dinosaur-like terrestrial wildlife that originally dwelled in Halo's environments were dropped due to gameplay constraints and fear that their presence would reduce the surprise and impact of the Flood.

Bungie decided a new visual language for the Flood was needed for Halo 3. The task of developing the new Flood forms, organic Flood terrain, and other miscellaneous changes fell to Vic DeLeon, then Bungie's Senior Environment Artist. Early concepts of what became new morphing Flood types in the game called "pure forms" featured the creatures wielding an array of weapons via tendrils, while forms like the Flood infector and Flood transport concepts never made it into the final game. The pure forms had to morph between three radically different looks, and it proved challenging to make plausible transformations that also looked good once it was developed and animated in 3D. Artist Shi Kai Wang suggested that in the end, they had simply tried to do too much and the results were less than they wanted.

Flood-infested structures were designed as angular to counterbalance Flood biomass, as well as provide surfaces for the game's artificial intelligence to exploit and move on. New additions were designed to be multi-purpose; exploding "growth pods" that spew Flood forms were added to the game to adjust pacing, provide instant action, and add to the visuals. Endoscopic pictures provided further inspiration. Halo 3 added new capabilities to the Flood, including the ability for the parasite to infect enemies in real-time. Bungie used Halo 3's improved capacity for graphics to make a host's sudden transformation into Flood form more dramatic; two different character models and skeletons were fused and swapped in real-time.

== Appearances ==
=== Games ===
The Flood makes its first appearance more than halfway through Halo: Combat Evolved, during the story mission "343 Guilty Spark". A group of humans fleeing the enemy alien Covenant land on "Halo", a ringworld built by the alien Forerunners. The artificial intelligence Cortana sends the supersoldier Master Chief to find their captain, Jacob Keyes, who disappeared in a swamp while searching for a weapons cache. The Master Chief discovers that the Covenant have accidentally released the Flood. Keyes' squad is turned into soldiers for the parasite, while Keyes is interrogated by the Flood in an attempt to learn the location of Earth and ultimately assimilated. The emergence of the Flood prompts Halo's caretaker artificial intelligence 343 Guilty Spark to enlist the help of the Master Chief in activating Halo's defenses and preventing a Flood outbreak. When Master Chief learns that activating Halo would instead wipe the galaxy of sentient life to prevent the Flood's spread, he and Cortana detonate the human ship Pillar of Autumn's engines, destroying the ring and preventing the Flood from escaping.

The Flood returns in Halo 2 (2004), appearing on another Halo ring called "Delta Halo". The Flood on Delta Halo is led by the Gravemind, a massive Flood intelligence that dwells in the bowels of the ring. The Gravemind brings together the Master Chief and the Covenant holy warrior known as the Arbiter and tasks them with stopping the Covenant leadership from activating the ring. In the meantime, the Gravemind infests the human ship In Amber Clad and crashes it into the Covenant space station High Charity. Once there, the Flood sweeps through the city, and the Gravemind captures Cortana. As the Flood spreads, the Covenant form a blockade in an effort to prevent the parasite from leaving its prison.

The Flood reappears in Halo 3 (2007), on board the damaged High Charity, which escapes the quarantine around Delta Halo and follows the Prophet of Truth to a Forerunner portal on Earth. While the infestation of Earth is prevented, Truth and High Charity travel through the portal to the Forerunner installation known as the Ark. The Gravemind manipulates the Master Chief and Arbiter into an alliance with the Flood to stop Truth from activating the Halo Array. Although Arbiter kills Truth, the Gravemind betrays them. The Master Chief fights his way to the center of High Charity, freeing Cortana and destroying the city, but the Gravemind attempts to rebuild itself on the Halo under construction at the Ark. Realizing that activating the ring will destroy only the local Flood infestation due to the Ark's location outside of the Milky Way, the Master Chief, Arbiter, and Cortana proceed to Halo's control room, activate the ring and escape.

The Flood also makes an appearance in the video game spinoffs Halo Wars and Halo Wars 2. In Halo Wars, they are encountered infesting a Forerunner installation and ultimately annihilated by the actions of the human ship Spirit of Fire's crew. In the Halo Wars 2 expansion "Awakening the Nightmare", the surviving Flood are accidentally released by the Banished while salvaging the remaining wreckage of High Charity. The expansion features new Flood types alongside those seen in previous games. The parasite also serves as an enemy in the cooperative "Firefight" mode of Halo Wars 2 and The Master Chief Collection. The Flood also appear in cooperative play in Halo: Spartan Assault.

With Halo 3, the developers added a multiplayer gamemode called "Infection", a last man standing mode based on a fan-created scenario where human players defend against enemy players, with each slain human adding to the infected's ranks. The game mode returned in Halo: Reach (2010), Halo 4 (2012), where it was renamed "Flood",The Master Chief Collection (2014), Halo 5 (2015), and Halo Infinite (2021).

=== Other appearances ===
The 2006 anthology The Halo Graphic Novel expands upon the Flood's release during the events of Halo: Combat Evolved in two stories, Last Voyage of the Infinite Succor and "Breaking Quarantine". Whereas the Flood is only hinted at being intelligent in the game, the Halo Graphic Novel shows the Flood has a hive mind, assimilating the knowledge of their hosts rapidly. Lee Hammock, writer of The Last Voyage of the Infinite Succor, described the basis of the story as a way to showcase the true danger of the Flood as an intelligent menace, rather than something the player encounters and shoots. Hammock also stated that the story would prove the intelligent nature of the Flood, and "hopefully euthanize the idea that they are just space zombies". The threat of the Flood is also highlighted in a short story from the Halo Evolutions anthology, "The Mona Lisa," which was later adapted into a motion comic.

The Flood also features heavily in Greg Bear's trilogy of novels, the Forerunner Saga, which takes place thousands of years before the events of the main games. The novel Halo: Silentium reveals that the Flood is what remains of the Precursors, an ancient race that was said to accelerate the evolution of a species and shape galaxies. The Forerunners overthrew the Precursors; on the verge of extinction, some Precursors reduced themselves to a biological powder that would regenerate into their past selves. Time rendered the powder defective, and it became mutagenic, reacting with other living organisms to produce what eventually mutated into the Flood. The Flood threatened ancient humanity and then the Forerunners, who ultimately build and activate the Halo Array to stop the parasite's spread.

The Flood appear in the finale of the Halo live-action series' second season; a Polygon review noted that the show's presentation is more akin to traditional zombies than that of the games.

== Analysis ==
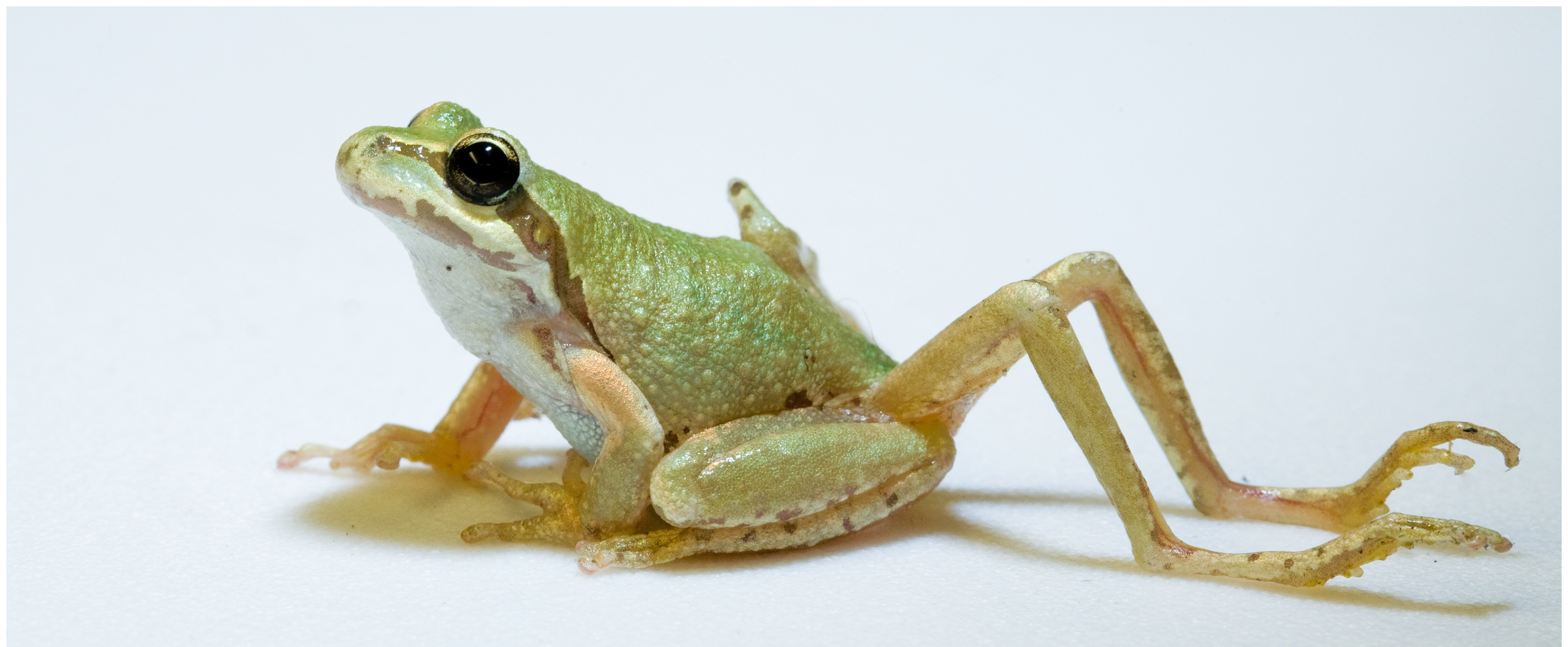
This frog infected by Ribeiroia demonstrates limb mutations similar to Flood combat forms.

The name of the Flood is one of many names taken from religious stories in the Halo franchise. The Flood and especially the Gravemind serve as demonic or satanic figures, and the Master Chief's descent into the bowels of Halo to encounter the Flood can be likened to a journey to hell. Academic P.C. Paulissen notes that the name 'Flood' suggests a reference to the biblical deluge, with the Forerunner Ark being shelter from the Flood's destructive and cleansing power akin to the Bible.

The lifecycle and parasitic nature of the Flood has similarities to the behaviors of real-world parasites. The Flood's induced physiological changes recall the modified eyestalks of hosts infected by Leucochloridium paradoxum, or malformed limbs of Ribeiroia-infected amphibians. The Flood's habit of altering its surroundings has parallels to the parasitoid wasp Hymenoepimecis argyraphaga's use of spider's webs for protection.

== Cultural impact ==
The surprise appearance of the Flood during Halo: Combat Evolved was seen as an important plot twist and a scary moment even after repeat playthroughs of the game. Gamasutra, writing about video game plots, gives the example of the Flood not only as an important reversal to the story of Halo, but an example of how games are made more interesting by twists in the plot. Rolling Stone and Kotaku credited the appearance of the Flood as an excellent way the game kept players on their toes, forcing them to adjust their strategies; Rolling Stone called the twist as shocking "as if, several levels into a game of Pac-Man, the dots suddenly began to attack you". IGN described Flood as one of their favorite video game monsters of all time, stating that "We like the Flood, but we hate them so very much." In contrast, critics such as GamesRadar's Charlie Barratt or The Guardian″s Keza MacDonald considered the Flood as one of the worst parts of Halo, turning the gameplay into what MacDonald called a "claustrophobic zombie shooter" and leading to repetitious and tiresome encounters in the latter part of the game. A panel of online reviewers noted that the Flood appeared in Halo 2 for no obvious reasons, and was simply described as "aggravating" to play against. Daniel Weissenberger of Gamecritics.com noted in his review of Halo 3 that even though the Flood looked better than ever, its single strategy of rushing the player proved tedious over time.

The Flood has been recognized as one of the greatest game villains, making lists of greatest villains and enemies from Wizard Magazine, GameDaily, Guinness World Records Gamer's Edition, PC World, IGN, and Electronic Gaming Monthly. MTV considered Flood possession in Halo 3 as a "great gaming moment" of 2007, stating that "with the power of the Xbox 360's graphics, this reanimation comes to vivid, distressing life, more memorably than it had in the earlier games. Here are the zombies of gaming doing what they do worst. [...] It's grisly and unforgettable."

The Flood feature in Halo merchandise, including action figures produced by Joyride Studios for Combat Evolved and Halo 2; Other Flood action figures and toys have been released by McFarlane Toys, Mega Bloks, and Jazwares. Other merchandise includes an Xbox 360 Avatar prop, and a limited edition silver-plated statue of Master Chief fighting a Flood form.

In 2025, U.S. Department of Homeland Security social media accounts posted an ICE advertisement photo with the caption "Destroy the Flood," referring to the ongoing deportations in the second Trump administration of illegal immigrants. Microsoft declined to comment on the posts. Martin O'Donnell, former lead composer of the Bungie-era Halo games and Republican nominee for the Nevada's 3rd congressional district, stated he would work with Trump, while fellow Bungie alumni Marcus Lehto and Jamie Griesemer objected to the post. "The Flood are evil space zombie parasites and are not an allegory to any group of people," Griesemer said. PC Gamer drew parallels from the administration calling immigrants parasites to historical efforts to dehumanize others in genocides.
