= Covenant (Halo) =

Fictional alliance from the game Halo

- Halo race
- Clockwise from left: a Covenant Mgalekgolo, Jiralhanae, Kig-Yar, and Unggoy as they appear in Halo 3 (2007).
- First appearance: Halo: Combat Evolved
- Created by: Bungie
- Genre: First-person shooter

In-universe information
- Other names: Elite (Sangheili); Grunt (Unggoy); Jackal (Kig-Yar); Skirmisher (T'vaoan); Hunter (Mgalekgolo); Prophet (San'Shyuum); Brute (Jiralhanae); Drone (Yanme'e); Engineer (Huragok)
- Sub-races: Sangheili; Unggoy; Kig-Yar (T'vaoan); Mgalekgolo; San'Shyuum; Jiralhanae; Yanme'e; Huragok

The Covenant is a fictional military alliance of various extraterrestrial species featured in the Halo science fiction series. The Covenant are composed of a variety of diverse species, united under the religious worship of the enigmatic Forerunners and their belief that Forerunner ringworlds, known as Halos, will provide a path to salvation. After the Covenant leadership – the High Prophets – declare humanity an affront to their gods, the Covenant prosecute a lengthy genocidal campaign against the technologically inferior race.

The Covenant were first introduced in the 2001 video game Halo: Combat Evolved as enemies against the player character, a human supersoldier known as the Master Chief. Unaware that the Halos were in fact intended to be weapons of mass destruction rather than salvation, the Covenant attempt to activate the rings on three separate occasions throughout the series, inadvertently releasing a virulent parasite known as the Flood in the process.

To develop a distinctive look for the various races of the Covenant, Bungie artists drew inspiration from reptilian, ursine, and avian characteristics. A Covenant design scheme of purples and reflective surfaces was made to separate the aliens from human architecture.

== Overview ==
In the primary 26th century setting of Halo, humanity and the Covenant clash for the first time in the year 2525. Searching for relics left behind by their gods, the Forerunners, the Covenant stumble across humans at the colony world of Harvest. The Covenant leadership discovers that the Forerunners designated humanity "reclaimers" of their legacy, and that the Covenant religion is built on falsehoods; to prevent the truth from being uncovered, they instigate a genocidal war against humanity.

The Covenant's superior technology gives them a distinct advantage in the war. In 2552, the Covenant discover and destroy Reach, one of humanity's greatest military strongholds. A human ship fleeing the battle discovers a Forerunner ringworld, Alpha Halo. The Covenant believe the activation of these rings are key to bringing about salvation, but the ring is destroyed by the human supersoldier Master Chief. Soon after, the Covenant falls into civil war as the truth of the Halo rings' purpose is revealed: they are actually weapons of mass destruction built to stop the spread of the parasitic Flood. The disgraced Covenant commander known as the Arbiter ultimately allies with the Master Chief to stop the Covenant and Flood, ending the Human-Covenant War. In the post-war era, various factions replace the power vacuum left by the Covenant; these include the Banished, who are featured as the main antagonists in both Halo Wars 2 and Halo Infinite.

== Game development ==
Throughout much of the development of Halo: Combat Evolved, very little concrete story details had been developed for the story campaign, and what trials the player character would face. Writer Joseph Staten and other Bungie staff came up with the idea of a coalition of alien races, subsequently deciding that the faction would be motivated by religion. During the course of development of Halo, the designers decided upon three "schools" of architecture, for each of the factions represented – humans, Covenant, and Forerunners. For the Covenant, the team decided on "sleek and shiny", with reflective surfaces, organic shapes, and use of purples. According to art director Marcus Lehto, the principle designs for the faction came from environmental artist Paul Russell, while concept artist Shi Kai Wang was instrumental in developing the look of the various races within the Covenant. Armor color was used to denote ranks of enemies.

Like the character designs, Covenant technology, architecture, and design continually changed throughout development, occasionally for practical reasons as well as aesthetics. According to Eric Arroyo, the Covenant cruiser Truth and Reconciliation, which plays a major role in Halo: Combat Evolved, was to be boarded by the player by a long ramp. However, due to technical considerations of having a fully textured ship so close to the player, the designers came up with a "gravity lift", which allowed the ship to be farther away (thus not requiring as much processing power for detail) as well as adding a "visually interesting" component of Covenant technology.

The art team also spent a large amount of time on Covenant weaponry, in order to make them suitably alien yet still recognizable to players. At the same time, the designers wanted all aspects of Covenant technology, especially the vehicles, to act plausibly. In contrast to human weapons firing projectiles, many of the Covenant's weaponry are depicted as firing plasma. A few of the Covenant's weapons are not plasma-based, including the Needler, which fires razor-sharp pink needles capable of homing on organic foes. A weapons expert noted parallels between the Needler and ancient Greek Amazons painting their daggers pink as a psychological weapon. Bungie designed the majority of Covenant technology to mirror the aesthetic of the Elites; the exteriors are sleek and graceful, with a more angular and complex core underneath hinting at the Forerunner origins of the technology.

=== Species ===
Covenant society is depicted as a caste system composed of different species. Bungie's artists looked at live animals and films for inspiration; as a result, the species within the Covenant bear simian, reptilian, avian, and ursine characteristics. Concept artist Shi Kai Wang focused on making each enemy seem appropriate to its role in gameplay. The species within the Covenant include:

- Sangheili (called "Elites" in human language) who stand nearly 8'6'' (2.6 m) and feature recharging personal shields. The Sangheili initially had simple mouths, which developed into pairs of split mandibles substituting for the lower jaws. Bungie concept artist Shi Kai Wang noted that project lead Jason Jones had been insistent on giving the Sangheili a tail. While Wang thought it made the aliens look too animalistic, the idea was dropped due to practical considerations, including where the tail would go when the Sangheili were driving vehicles. According to Paul Russel, when Bungie was bought by Microsoft and Halo was turned into an Xbox launch title, Microsoft took issue with the design of the Sangheili, as they felt that the Sangheili had a resemblance to cats that might alienate Japanese consumers. The Elites usually take command of a Grunt squad.
- Unggoy (nicknamed "Grunts" by humans), are short, methane-breathing bipeds commonly depicted as basic foot soldiers. Squat and cowardly fighters, Unggoy panic and flee if players kill their commanders although they can pose a threat on higher difficulty settings, especially if encountered in groups.
- Kig-Yar (nicknamed "Jackals" by humans) carry energy shields or long-ranged weaponry. In some cases, such as with the Kig-Yar, the overall design was honed once the enemy's role was clearly defined. The Jackals are generally used as snipers and shock troops. A subspecies of Kig-Yar called T'vaoan (nicknamed "Skirmishers" by humans) appear in Halo: Reach and Halo Infinite, and are faster and more agile by comparison.
- Mgalekgolo (nicknamed "Hunters" by humans) are collectives species of pseudo annelid creatures called Lekgolo worms that physically shape their colonies in both powerful and practical ways. They are encased in tough armor. Initial concepts were less humanoid-looking and softer than the final shape, with angular shields and razor-sharp spines. Hunters are encountered in pairs, and if one is killed, the survivor becomes enraged.
- San'Shyuum (nicknamed "Prophets" by humans) serve as the supreme commanders and administrators of the Covenant, and were primarily designed by Shi Kai Wang and Eric Arroyo. Originally, the San’Shyuum were built in a more unified way, with the gravity thrones they used for flotation and movement fused with the Prophet's organic structures. The characters were also designed to be feeble, yet sinister. The three Prophet Hierarchs were each individually designed.
- Jiralhanae (nicknamed "Brutes" by humans) are even more physically imposing than the Sangheili, with their society organized around tribal chieftains. Inspired by the animators watching biker films, the Jiralhanae incorporated simian and ursine elements while retaining an alien look. Wang's final concept for the creatures in Halo 2, replete with bandoliers and human skulls, was simplified for the game. Jiralhanae were meant to typify the abusive alien menace of the Covenant and in the words of design lead Jaime Griesemer, to serve as "barbarians in Rome".
- Yanme'e (nicknamed "Drones" by humans) are flying insectoid creatures who are relatively weak individually but attack in large swarms. The animators found the creatures challenging, as they had to be animated to walk, run, crawl, or fly on multiple surfaces. Old concept art from Halo: Combat Evolved was repurposed in influencing the Yanme'e final shape, which took cues from cockroaches, grasshoppers, and wasps.
- Huragok (nicknamed "Engineers" by humans) are floating support workers crafted by the Forerunners that resemble, but aren't, organic beings. Peaceful in nature, they were enslaved by the Covenant and implanted with explosives to serve as mobile shield generators for their troops in combat. Engineers were cut from Halo: Combat Evolved, but later appear in Halo Wars, Halo 3: ODST, Halo: Reach and Halo Wars 2 as well as supplemental media.

With subsequent games, the Covenant and their look were changed or refined to account for increased graphic hardware or gameplay needs. In Halo 3, the Jiralhanae became the primary enemy, and they were heavily redesigned. Concept artists took inspiration from rhinoceroses and gorillas, and armored them with buckles and clothing to represent a different aesthetic look compared to the Covenant. Weaponry was designed to reflect the Jiralhanae’s "souls" distilled to its purest form – conveyed by dangerous shapes, harsh colors, and objects that looked "dangerous to be around". The more seasoned the Brute, the more ornate clothing and helmets; the armor was designed to convey a culture and tradition to the species, and emphasize their mass and power. Designs for Halo 3 took cues from ancient Greek Spartans. Character animators recorded intended actions for the new Jiralhanae in a padded room at Bungie. A new addition to the Jiralhanae artificial intelligence was a pack mentality; leader Brutes direct large-scale actions simultaneously, such as throwing grenades towards a player.

Halo: Reach served as a prequel to Halo: Combat Evolved, and creative director Marcus Lehto pushed for the team to revamp the Covenant. The aliens' translated English was replaced with untranslated, guttural alien sounds, and their look and weaponry was redesigned. The goal was to make the Covenant intimidating and more alien to players.

== Analysis ==
The Covenant serve as one of a number of religious allusions in Halo. Their name refers to sacred agreements between the people of Israel and their God in Jewish and Christian tradition, and could be used to indicate the attitude of superiority complex the aliens have to the inferior and sacrilegious humans. The Covenant's ships bear names referring to elements of Judeo-Christian religion. A review of religions and religious material in video games noted that the Covenant's invented religion had many similarities to those in similar games, and would likely be called a cult in the real world. The thematic parallels of religious zealots fighting an American military metaphor was not lost on Microsoft's content review team, who forced a name change of the holy warrior "Dervish" to Arbiter before the release of Halo 2. Theologian P.C.J.M. Paulissen notes that while on the surface the Halo games present a conflict between rational humans and religious alien fanaticism, the comparison is complicated by the technical superiority of the Covenant (they wield energy weapons compared to primitive human ballistics) and the games seem to reject the idea science and religion are rigidly disconnected.

== Cultural impact ==
=== Merchandise ===
Microsoft has commissioned multiple sets of action figures and merchandise featuring Covenant characters for each video game. The Halo 3 action figure sets have been made by McFarlane Toys, and include Brutes and Jackals. The Covenant's weaponry has also been adapted into large-scale replicas.

=== Reception ===
The Covenant were positively received in Combat Evolved, with their artificial intelligence praised and the different tactics needed to defeat each enemy type commended.

The ability to experience the storyline of Halo 2 from the Covenant perspective was described as a "brilliant stroke of game design". Allowing the player to assume the role of a Sangheili who was described as providing an unexpected plot twist, and allowing the player to experience a "newfound complexity to the story". In addition, some reviewers thought that this provided the series with a significant plot element – IGN referred to it as the "intriguing side story of Thel 'Vadam and his Sangheili" – and its elimination in Halo 3 was pointed to as responsible for reducing the role of the Arbiter within the series plot. Guinness World Records Gamer's Edition listed Covenant as 16th in their list of top 50 Villains.
