= Billy Levy =

American entrepreneur

William Levy, also known as Billy, is an American entrepreneur best known for co-founding the eSports platform Virgin Gaming, with Sir Richard Branson and Zack Zeldin.

Levy co-founded on-demand tech support business, Nerd Alert, federally licensed Canadian medical cannabis business, Mettrum Health Corp. (acquired by Canopy Growth Corp. in 2016), mobile commerce platform, Virgin Mega (acquired by Nike), cannabis consumer branded products company SLANG Worldwide, and gaming media and entertainment company GG Group.

In January 2019, Levy, alongside co-founder Peter Miller, took the cannabis brand company, SLANG Worldwide, public on the Canadian Securities Exchange. In March 2019, Levy and Miller were named as one of the High Times 100 Most Influential People in Cannabis for their leadership in the cannabis industry. Levy then co-founded, GG Group, a holding company that owns a variety of media entities, with early esports entrepreneur, Zack Zeldin, and celebrity partners Pusha T and Logic.
