= Halo 4 =

2012 video game

- Developer: 343 Industries (Note: Additional work by Certain Affinity)
- Publisher: Microsoft Studios
- Director: Josh Holmes
- Producer: Chris Lee
- Designer: Scott Warner
- Programmer: David Berger
- Artist: Kenneth Scott
- Writers: Christopher Schlerf; Josh Holmes
- Composers: Neil Davidge; Kazuma Jinnouchi
- Series: Halo
- Platform: Xbox 360
- Release: November 6, 2012
- Genre: First-person shooter
- Modes: Single-player, multiplayer

Halo 4 is a 2012 first-person shooter game developed by 343 Industries and published by Microsoft Studios for the Xbox 360. Halo 4's story follows a genetically enhanced human supersoldier, Master Chief, and his artificial intelligence construct Cortana, as they encounter unknown threats while exploring an ancient civilization's planet. The player assumes the role of Master Chief who battles against a new faction that splintered off from remnants of the Covenant, a former military alliance of alien races, as well as a new enemy: mechanical warriors of the Forerunner empire known as the Prometheans. The game features a new selection of weapons, enemies, and game modes not present in previous titles of the series.

Development of Halo 4 began in 2009 and continued until September 2012. Halo 4 is 343 Industries' first original title within the Halo series—previously, development of the main series was undertaken by Bungie, the creator of the franchise. In the developmental process, 343 Industries decided to explore the Forerunner fiction within the Halo universe, leading the team to design a new setting, enemies, and main antagonist. Existing characters and assets received visual overhauls, recreated from the ground up, and motion capture was used for animation within cutscenes. A goal for Halo 4's story was to incorporate more human elements; to achieve this, the developers chose to delve more deeply into the relationship between the two protagonists, Master Chief and Cortana. Several external studios assisted 343 Industries with developing Halo 4, and over 350 people worked on the game in total.

The game was officially announced at Electronic Entertainment Expo 2011 (E3) on June 6. Prior to launch, Microsoft stated that Halo 4 was the most expensive video game title the company had created so far. The game was marketed with promotional events and videos, including the creation of a live-action film, Halo 4: Forward Unto Dawn. Halo 4 grossed US$220 million on its launch day and $300 million in its opening week—a record for the franchise. More than one million people played Halo 4 on Xbox Live within the first 24 hours of its release. The game was met with positive reviews by critics and received multiple nominations and awards from the press. It was re-released as part of Halo: The Master Chief Collection for the Xbox One in 2014, and for Windows in 2020. It was followed by a sequel, Halo 5: Guardians, in 2015 for Xbox One.

== Gameplay ==
Player character Master Chief attacks an enemy Promethean Knight with an assault rifle in Halo 4's campaign mode.

Halo 4 is a shooter game in which players predominantly experience gameplay from a first-person perspective; the game perspective switches to third-person when using certain weapons, abilities and vehicles. The player's head-up display (HUD) shows real-time information on the player character's armor system, such as shield status, information on current weapons and abilities, and waypoints for goals and objectives. The HUD also has a motion tracker that detects allies, enemies, and vehicles within a certain radius of the player. The game sees the return of the alien species who were formerly members of the Covenant as foes, and introduces a new type of enemy called the Prometheans, which are Forerunner artificial intelligence (AI) constructs. There are three types of Prometheans: Knights serve as leaders of the group and are considered the deadliest of the Promethean forces; Crawlers are a weaker class that often attack in packs; and Watchers offer support and have the ability to shield or revive Promethean allies.

Halo 4 features updated versions of many human and Covenant weaponry from previous Halo games, as well as introducing new weapons for the humans, Covenant and Prometheans. The game also features reusable equipment, called armor abilities, introduced in Halo: Reach. New armor abilities are autosentry; the hardlight shield, which activates a protective barrier similar to a riot shield; Promethean vision, which diminishes environment detail and shows hidden players as silhouettes; a regeneration field, which heals all players in close proximity and can emit a short range kinetic blast; and finally the thruster pack, which allows the player to launch themselves several feet in a horizontal direction. Returning abilities include active camouflage; jetpack; and hologram, which creates a doppelgänger of the player running towards a target point. Sprinting returns in Halo 4; however, players can now use it independently of their armor ability. New gameplay mechanics introduced to the series include throwing and catching, which has been implemented into the multiplayer game modes Oddball and Grifball.

=== Modes ===
Halo 4's story or campaign mode can be played alone or cooperatively with one other player on the same console via split screen, and up to three other players through Xbox Live. Unlike in Halo 3 cooperative campaign where each player takes the role of a different character, in Halo 4 all players assume the role of Master Chief. Players can enable "skulls" in the campaign menu which act as gameplay modifiers such as increasing enemy health, changing NPC behavior or removing elements of the player's HUD. The campaign also features terminals which provide the player with additional backstory via videos viewed in the Halo Waypoint application on the Xbox 360.

In Halo 4's multiplayer component, titled "Infinity", players assume the role of a customizable Spartan-IV super-soldier. Players can progress through ranks by earning experience points from completing matches and challenges. Gameplay items such as visual customizations, weapons, armor abilities, and various upgrades are unlocked and can be acquired by players when they gain ranks. Once players attain rank SR-50, they can enlist into a "Specialization", enabling them to unlock further cosmetic and gameplay-enhancing customizations for their Spartan. War Games is a competitive multiplayer matchmaking mode. There are various playlists with different game types ranging from standard deathmatch to objective oriented modes such as capture the flag. War Games can be played with up to sixteen players on Xbox Live and has up to four-player split screen support. In Halo 4, players are able to join certain multiplayer matchmaking sessions while they are in progress. Spartan Ops is a story-driven episodic game mode, that can be played solo or cooperatively like the campaign mode. It serves as a replacement for the Firefight game mode that featured in Halo: Reach and Halo 3: ODST. Ten episodes of content were released for Spartan Ops, each featured a cinematic and five objective-based missions. The first five episodes were delivered on a weekly basis following Halo 4's launch, the final five episodes were released in early 2013.

Other game features include Forge, a map-editing tool first introduced in Halo 3. Like War Games it has both split screen and Xbox Live support. Using the tool, players can edit default multiplayer maps by adding or modifying spawn points, weapons and items, or create new ones using canvases. Forge in Halo 4 contains a new "magnet" feature for connecting forge pieces together. Theater mode allows players to view films, create video clips, and capture screen shots from recent matches in War Games or custom games. Halo 4 also offers a file sharing system that allows players to upload and share video clips, screenshots, custom maps and game variants.

== Synopsis ==
=== Setting and characters ===
Halo 4 takes place in a futuristic science fiction setting in the year 2557, four years after the events of Halo 3. Backstory details that hundreds of thousands of years before the modern era, humans were one of several interstellar civilizations. Following a war with the parasitic Flood, the humans came into conflict with the Forerunners, a powerful race that upheld a policy of benevolent shepherding of other races known as the Mantle of Responsibility. After centuries of war the Forerunners defeated the humans and stripped them of their technology and empire. The Forerunners soon fought the Flood themselves; after exhausting every other strategic option available to them, the Forerunners activated weapons of mass destruction known as the Halo Array. The Array's firing killed all sentient life in the galaxy to deprive the Flood of their food. Life that the Forerunners cataloged was then reseeded throughout the galaxy.

In the 26th century, humanity came under attack by the Covenant, an alien collective of species that worship the Forerunners as gods. The human supersoldier Master Chief Petty Officer John-117 and his artificial intelligence companion Cortana, were instrumental in stopping the Halos from being activated, sterilizing the Flood outbreak before they could menace the galaxy once again, and defeating the Covenant resulting in the end of the war. At the end of Halo 3, Chief and Cortana were left stranded in unknown space aboard the remains of the vessel Forward Unto Dawn.

=== Plot ===
==== Campaign ====
Forward Unto Dawn drifts towards an unknown Forerunner planet, later revealed to be the shield world Requiem. Cortana wakes Master Chief from cryonic sleep shortly before forces from a newly formed Covenant splinter faction board the vessel. The remnants of Forward Unto Dawn are caught in Requiem's gravity well and pass through an opening to crash-land on its interior. As Chief and Cortana explore Requiem, fighting hostile forces from the new Covenant faction and mechanical warriors called "Promethean Knights", Cortana malfunctions. She reveals that she is experiencing "rampancy", a declining mental state faced by smart AIs past their usual seven year life-span. Chief promises to get Cortana to Earth, believing that Cortana's creator, Doctor Catherine Halsey, can fix Cortana's condition. Chief and Cortana pick up garbled transmissions from a human ship, UNSC Infinity, who have picked up the Dawn's distress call. Cortana attempts to warn Infinity away from Requiem's gravity well and directs the Chief to deactivate what she believes are communications jammers. Instead, the Chief unwittingly releases the Didact, an ancient Forerunner warrior, from imprisonment. The Didact, who deems Man unworthy of the Mantle of Responsibility, takes control of the Prometheans and the Covenant faction, then attacks Infinity after it is dragged into Requiem.

Chief makes contact with Infinity and helps repel the Didact's attack. Chief and Cortana recommend attacking the Didact while he is vulnerable, but Infinity captain Del Rio orders them to destroy the gravity well so their ship can escape. In the process, Chief is contacted by a Forerunner known as the Librarian—the wife of the Didact, as well as ancient humanity's protector. She explains that the Forerunners were divided on how best to combat the Flood. After failing to discover a way to immunize biological beings from the parasite, the Didact used a device called the Composer to convert the warriors under his command into Promethean Knights immune to infection. Requiring more soldiers, the Didact forcibly converted captured humans into Prometheans, before being stopped and imprisoned by the Librarian. The Librarian, who has guided humanity's development, accelerates the Chief's evolution to grant him immunity to the Composer.

After destroying the gravity well, Del Rio orders a retreat back to Earth, doubting the Chief and Cortana's testimony. The Master Chief disobeys orders to stand down and relinquish the malfunctioning Cortana, and stays behind to oppose the Didact. Chief and Cortana attempt to sabotage the Didact's ship before he leaves, but are unsuccessful. They follow the Didact to a Halo ring, Installation 03. The Composer has been moved from the ring onto the nearby Ivanoff Research Station, which the Covenant faction attacks. The Chief defends Ivanoff, but the Didact retrieves the Composer and uses it on the station, composing everyone on Ivanoff except for Chief.

Chief and Cortana use a fighter to follow the Didact's ship to Earth. Aided by Infinity and the home fleet, the Chief boards the Didact's ship with a nuclear warhead. Cortana inserts copies of herself into the Didact's computer systems to overwhelm the Didact's shield, but not before the Didact directs the Composer at Earth and begins composing the population of New Phoenix. With the help of Cortana, the Chief defeats the Didact, who falls into a portal underneath the Composer. The Master Chief activates the bomb but is saved by Cortana, who sacrifices herself. The Chief is found by a rescue team and is taken back to Infinity, where he mourns the loss of Cortana.

In a post-credits scene, the Didact proclaims the Forerunners' role as custodians of the galaxy having to bear the Mantle of Responsibility, and humanity as the greatest threat in the galaxy. Master Chief removes his armor aboard Infinity; if the player completes the game on Legendary difficulty, the Chief's heavily scarred face is briefly shown.

==== Spartan Ops ====
Six months after the New Phoenix incident, the UNSC Infinity returns to Requiem, where the Prometheans and the Covenant splinter faction—led by Jul 'Mdama, who styles himself as "the Didact's Hand"—are still active. Sarah Palmer, commander of the Spartan-IVs, deploys Spartan squads to clear out Jul 'Mdama's Covenant and Promethean forces in Requiem's interior in order to set up research bases. Fireteam Crimson recovers a mysterious artifact excavated by 'Mdama's Covenant; Infinity scientist Doctor Glassman disappears after studying the device. Catherine Halsey is brought to Infinity due to her knowledge of Forerunner technology. She is kept under guard by marines and Spartans including Gabriel Thorne, who lost his family during the Didact's attack on Earth. While studying the artifact, Halsey begins receiving messages on her computer from an anonymous sender. The source of the transmissions is 'Mdama, who captures Glassman and forces him to work on a Forerunner device that supposedly contains the Librarian. Palmer arrests Halsey for communicating with 'Mdama, but Halsey uses an override code to force Infinity's AI, Roland, to assist her. Halsey contacts 'Mdama to try and strike a deal, as they both want to find the Librarian; Roland breaks free of Halsey's control and summons guards to apprehend Halsey. Promethean forces invade Infinity, capture Halsey, and teleport her to 'Mdama's base. Serin Osman, head of the Office of Naval Intelligence (ONI), orders Infinity captain Thomas Lasky to kill Halsey, but he is reluctant to do so. Palmer sets off to Requiem to kill Halsey; Lasky tells Fireteam Majestic to intervene and rescue Halsey from 'Mdama.

Halsey steps into the Forerunner device and makes contact with the Librarian. The Librarian gives Halsey the two pieces of the "Janus Key", an instrument that provides the location for all Forerunner technology in the galaxy, and instructs Halsey to use the key to advance humankind. Upon receiving the key, Halsey exits the device and 'Mdama takes half of the key from her. Halsey passes the second piece to Fireteam Majestic. Palmer wounds Halsey in the arm just before a Promethean teleports 'Mdama and Halsey from the base. 'Mdama sets Requiem to collide with the nearby sun and his forces evacuate the planet. Fireteams Crimson and Majestic disable devices that anchor Infinity to Requiem, allowing the ship to escape before the installation is destroyed. Meanwhile, Halsey, who has lost her arm, offers to ally herself to 'Mdama.

== Development ==
In October 2007, shortly after the release of Halo 3, Halo developer Bungie split off from parent company Microsoft. Microsoft retained the intellectual property and rights to Halo, and Bungie continued developing Halo games until 2010. During this period of time Microsoft formed an internal division, 343 Industries, to manage the franchise and develop future games.

In 2008, while 343 Industries was still in formation, Microsoft approached Starlight Runner Entertainment to help assemble the "Halo bible". Starlight Runner is a New York-based company that specializes in creating and producing transmedia franchises. Their job was to examine all content of the Halo universe, clean it up, and make it coherent and understandable for the people involved with the creation of Halo games and media. Frank O'Connor, a content manager at Bungie, assisted the team with the creation of the "Halo bible" before moving to 343 Industries to become Halo franchise development director. Unlike the original trilogy, the story for Halo 4 was designed to be part of a multi-game arc from the beginning. Christopher Schlerf and Holmes wrote the script and story. In addition, 343 Industries aimed for "a more complete connectivity between all of their future media than before"; relating Halo 4's story to the Forerunner Saga and Kilo-Five Trilogy novels as well as using terminals in Halo: Combat Evolved Anniversary to introduce background knowledge on the Forerunners.

343 started with a staff of roughly a dozen people, but grew to nearly 200 through development. Halo 4's development team included former employees of more than 25 triple-A studios. Prospective employees could not be told they were going to be working on Halo 4. "We had people who we hired who hated Halo because of 'X,'" said Frank O'Connor, 343 Industries' franchise development director. "But what that really meant was, 'I feel like this game could be awesome because of 'Y input' that I'm going to bring into it. I want to prove it, and I'm passionate about proving it.' So we ended up with a bunch of people who were genuinely passionate about the product. That is a huge advantage, and that helped in hiring and forming our team." This rapid hiring and growth occurred during development of the game, creating issues; because the team was committed to a delivery date, Halo 4 executive producer Kiki Wolfkill said that the team was forced to make "necessary mistakes", with production difficulties and a team inexperienced with working together contributing to development difficulties. Nine months before shipping, the developers restructured the game's production pipeline and gave individual teams more control due to bottlenecks in development. With so many developers from different backgrounds, forging a common goal and company culture was different. Creative director Josh Holmes recalled that an "epiphany moment" that proved the team was headed in the right direction was early in development, when the team completed a section of the game that was "very traditional [Halo]". Despite positive feedback from testers, 343 Industries discarded the prototype as too traditional, but felt that it showed the team could work together.

Including contractors, 350 people worked on the game. 343 Industries contracted Certain Affinity, an independent video game development studio, to help with the development of Halo 4; they started work on the game in early 2011. Certain Affinity has worked alongside Bungie and 343 Industries on producing multiplayer content for previous Halo titles. The studio developed the Forge mode, co-developed War Games and created a number of maps and multiplayer modes for Halo 4.

Halo 4 and Halo: Combat Evolved Anniversary were both officially announced on June 6, 2011, at the E3 2011. Halo 4 is the first installment in the Reclaimer Saga of Halo games. The studio's creative team, which included nearly 200 people led by creative director Josh Holmes, started developing the game as early as 2009. Prior to the release of the game, Microsoft Studios Vice President Phil Spencer stated that the Halo franchise is the "most important entertainment product in the company" and that Halo 4 was the most expensive game that Microsoft had made. A demonstration of the game's campaign was first shown at E3 2012. The developers described it as a pivotal moment in development, as it was the first time the game had been shown publicly. The positive reaction was a morale boost for the team, who were unsure how the public would react. On July 7, 2012, a pre-release build of Halo 4's Forge mode was showcased by 343 Industries and Certain Affinity at RTX which took place at the Austin Convention Center. On September 26, 2012, O'Connor announced that the game's development was complete.

=== Design ===
Following Halo 4's announcement, O'Connor reported that both Master Chief and Cortana would undergo "radical" changes in appearance for the game, some of them attributed to better graphics and others to story elements. The studio wanted Master Chief's appearance to convey an imposing mass and weight, to show that one of his characteristics is his 800-pound (360 kg) armor. They studied the armor changes that were made for the Spartans in Halo: Reach, which were much bulkier than renditions in previous Halo games. Character and concept artists began redesigning the Master Chief by creating sketches; these sketches would be rendered into 3D models so the team could analyze the design from every possible angle. The team would then return to creating sketches to make adjustments, and repeat the process until the main structure for the Master Chief was created. The team then worked on the finer details of his appearance.

During the concepting process of Halo 4, O'Connor decided it would be best for the franchise to explore the Forerunner fiction of the Halo universe, which had remained largely a mystery before 343 Industries' involvement in the franchise. This ultimately led to the creation of a new race of enemy, the Prometheans, warriors of the Forerunner empire. Given that the Forerunners themselves had never been featured in previous Halo games, the design process for the appearance of the Prometheans was long and tedious. The art team produced a large number of sketches, which were presented to other members of the studio to get feedback and reactions. Many variations of different character models were considered before the team decided on a final design. The main goal when designing their appearance was to make them resonate with the player, and evoke the image of the Forerunner architecture and language that had been portrayed in previous Halo media. Upon death, the Promethean Knight dissolves from the point where it was last shot; this visual effect also occurs when certain enemies are killed by Promethean weapons. From a gameplay standpoint the design for the Prometheans also needed to fit in well with the sandbox so they would be suitable enemies to fight. A goal when designing their behavior was to make them highly adaptive from a tactical standpoint. For example, the Promethean Knight can phase in and out of space, allowing it to retreat or charge the player at any given moment; this changes the way that a player engages in a combat encounter.

Holmes explained that one of the goals for Halo 4's campaign was to incorporate more human elements into the story. To accomplish this the team wrote a B story that explored Master Chief's relationship with his AI partner, Cortana, who would break down into a dementia-like state. The development team realized that Halo 4's narrative could be dense and hard to approach, making it inaccessible for new players. They found incorporating such a storyline into an action game to be extremely challenging and considered dropping it during development. Holmes was adamant about including it; he took inspiration from his mother's battle with dementia, which she was diagnosed with near the start of the game's development. This led Holmes to want to capture the emotion and tell "a perfect story".

A piece of concept art showing the gravity-defying architecture and scenery of the Forerunner planet, Requiem

The senior art director for Halo 4 is Kenneth Scott; he described the visual style of Halo 4 as being more ingrained in the expanded universe fiction, and more "mature" than before. With the game's increased focus on the Forerunners, the artists invested heavily into the look and feel of Forerunner technology. The game also features more diversity in Forerunner structures, including fully active Forerunner technology as opposed to the mostly inert and abandoned structures seen in the earlier games. The majority of the game is lit statically using lightmaps; this allowed the art team to achieve realistic lighting effects with full global illumination and ambient occlusion. Image-based lighting is also used to ground scenes and make everything fit together better.

The cooperative Spartan Ops mode originally began as a Firefight-type mode, similar to that featured in Halo: Reach, but was composed of different objective-oriented mission types. Over the course of development, changes were made to Spartan Ops to include a narrative that would tie Halo 4's multiplayer together. The missions were designed primarily for four player co-op. The Spartan Ops development team worked with the narrative team to use ideas and storylines to shape the mode such that the cinematics would tie in with the missions.

Glasgow based animation studio, Axis Animation, assisted 343 Industries on the creation of CGI cinematics for the Spartan Ops game mode. Axis have produced animations for numerous video games, including the award-winning announcement trailer for Dead Island. To make each Spartan Ops episode as engaging as possible the team at Axis shot and edited episodes in live action using performance capture. The team then used the reference cameras at the live action shoot to create a performance edit, before shooting with CG cameras to provide more coverage of all scenes and a greater selection of shots for the editorial team. The shading team at Axis made use of the 3D animation package, Houdini, to procedurally generate the environment in the cinematics. Axis worked with Glasgow-based audio post production company Savalas on sound design and the final mix for the Spartan Ops cinematics. Facial motion capture was also utilized to take the movements and facial expressions from actors and apply them to the in-game cinematics for both Spartan Ops and campaign. Performance capture for both campaign and Spartan Ops cutscenes was directed and recorded at Giant Studios. Axis worked in conjunction with Giant Studios and Cubic Motion to develop a special facial motion capture solution that would retain facial expressions from the actors when creating the animation.

Visual effects house The Sequence Group, who had previously developed animation for Halo: Combat Evolved Anniversary's terminals, returned to create additional animation for Halo 4. The Terminals feature a painterly artistic style, which Sequence president Ian Kirby felt appealed to gamers familiar with the style of concept art. In addition to creating the visuals for the Halo 4 terminals, their work appeared in one of the game's main cinematics. To save time and expense using traditional motion capture methods to animate the 3D characters, The Sequence Group used twin Microsoft Kinect infrared sensors to create a home-made solution.

The game utilizes much of the "sandbox" that has been featured across all six prior Halo games and other media, in addition to introducing new characters, weapons, vehicles, and other elements. The game engine used is a heavily modified version of the engine established by Bungie. Unlike previous games in the Halo series, Halo 4 runs natively in 720p resolution. The game itself comes on two discs and requires 4GB of available storage space either on an 8GB USB flash drive or Xbox 360 hard drive to play the multiplayer component. Disc two is used to install the multiplayer content and disc one is used for launching the game. Due to rendering issues and significant engine changes, Theater support for Halo 4's campaign and Spartan Ops was not featured in the game on launch; however 343 Industries expressed that this feature may be implemented in the future.

As with previous Halo titles, 343 Industries provides a statistic tracking service for players of Halo 4. Player data such as game history, character progression, and various statistics can be accessed in game or via the Halo Waypoint website. The web services team at 343 Industries utilized the Windows Azure Service Bus messaging infrastructure to relay data from the Xbox Live network to back-end databases, where player data and information is stored. Halo 4 player data can also be accessed via the Xbox SmartGlass application.

=== Audio ===
British record producer and composer Neil Davidge wrote the music for Halo 4. Davidge is best known for his work as a co-writer and producer for the band Massive Attack, and also composed the scores for numerous films. Davidge intended to add "a touch of romance" to the score as well as adding more electronic sounds while keeping Halo's style.

Sotaro Tojima, best known for his work on Konami's Castlevania: Circle of the Moon and Metal Gear Solid 4: Guns of the Patriots, served as Halo 4's audio director. The team performed many live audio recording sessions, several of which occurred in Tasmania, Australia. Some of these recording sessions took place in generally inhospitable environments, such as underwater, in fire, and in ice, through the use of specially designed microphones; other recording sessions have utilized "home made" explosives. Tojima intended for the game's audio to be clearly grounded in the Halo universe, while also having a more realistic quality than in past titles.

Music composer Kazuma Jinnouchi, also formerly from Konami, joined 343 Industries during the production of Halo 4 in 2011. He contributed several additional tracks for the game. He would later go on to be the sole composer of the game's sequel, Halo 5: Guardians, in 2015.

=== Cast ===
Voice actors returning to reprise their roles in Halo 4 include Steve Downes as Master Chief, and Jen Taylor as both Cortana and Halsey. The two actors recorded together for the first time, as Downes actually flew to 343's Washington headquarters instead of recording in his hometown of Chicago. Voices for new characters include Mark Rolston as Captain Andrew Del Rio, Darren O'Hare as Thomas Lasky, Jennifer Hale as Sarah Palmer, Adrienne Barbeau as Dr. Tillson, Keith Szarabajka as the Didact, Travis Willingham as Jul 'Mdama, and Lori Tritel as the Librarian. Additional voices provided include Conan O'Brien, Andy Richter, and Jason Bradbury. Employees of Rooster Teeth Productions' have cameo roles in Spartan Ops, as characters from the Halo machinima Red vs. Blue. Bruce Thomas was the performance capture actor playing the role of Master Chief and actress Mackenzie Mason played the performance role of Cortana. Taylor served as the motion capture source for Halsey.

== Marketing ==
On January 19, 2012, McFarlane Toys announced that they would be creating action figures for Halo 4, bringing new characters, weapons and vehicles from the video game to the fans. McFarlane Toys CEO and founder, Todd McFarlane said that he was "really excited to be working with the all-star team of 343 Industries". McFarlane also stated that they would continue and expand their previous figure line which would be rebranded as Halo Universe. On February 14, 2012, toy company Mega Brands revealed a new product series in their Mega Bloks Halo Universe collector's line. Both McFarlane Toys and Mega Brands revealed their figures at the 2012 American International Toy Fair. Jada Toys launched a new line of Halo 4 die-cast toys in August 2012; Sideshow Collectibles also revealed a Halo 4 Premium Cortana Figure. Toy manufacturer Funko released Master Chief, Cortana and Spartan-IV figures for their Pop! Vinyl toyline on November 8, 2012. On June 11, 2012, video game console peripherals manufacturer, Mad Catz Interactive, Inc. announced that they had signed a deal with Microsoft Studios to create a Halo 4-branded gaming headset; the product shipped on October 30, 2012.

343 Industries and Microsoft also created a Halo 4 art book, titled Awakening: The Art of Halo 4; it was published by Titan Books and released on November 6, 2012. The book contains a collection of concept art and sketches accompanied by commentary from the artists at 343 Industries. A limited-edition version of the book was also released with only a thousand copies available worldwide. Another book, Halo 4: The Essential Visual Guide was created by 343 Industries in collaboration with DK Publishing and was released September 24, 2013. It contains annotated artwork and profiles on characters, items, and locations within the Halo universe.

Microsoft once again partnered up with PepsiCo, having done so previously while promoting Halo 3. In the United States players were able to earn double experience in Halo 4 by purchasing Mountain Dew and Doritos and then redeem product codes found on the packaging using an iOS and Android app game called Halo 4: King of the Hill Fueled by Mountain Dew. Players were able to redeem product codes from October 15, 2012, on websites that PepsiCo set up for the promotion. In the United Kingdom, a promotion ran from September 24, 2012, until December 4, 2012, where purchasers of Mountain Dew were able to redeem codes to have a chance of winning copies of Halo 4, Xbox 360 avatar items and a trip to Seattle to attend a tour around the studio of 343 Industries. Microsoft also partnered with Pizza Hut branches in the United Kingdom; people who entered the contest via an official website had a chance of winning Halo 4-themed prizes. The contest was open from October 22, 2012, until December 30, 2012; entering participants also received a free code for a Halo 4 Xbox 360 avatar outfit. Microsoft partnered with American Express to offer a promotion for eligible card holders in the United States and United Kingdom. Card holders who sync their American Express card with their Xbox Live account receive coupons and credits and are also rewarded with additional credits and coupons for obtaining achievements in Halo 4. Microsoft also offered Halo 4 armor, for Xbox Live avatars, to people who watched at least thirty minutes of footage from the 2012 United States presidential debates on their Xbox 360.

On October 31, 2012, Microsoft and government-owned organization Liechtenstein Marketing transformed the countryside of Liechtenstein for a special live action event for fans and members of the press. The Gutenberg Castle was transformed into a military fortification where guests tried out Halo 4 for the first time. A nearby countryside had a United Nations Space Command military camp installed and Balzers Quarry was transformed into a battleground where fifteen actors played out a two-hour-long adventure.

=== Promotional videos ===
Halo 4 was announced with a trailer at E3 2011, titled "Awakening". It was directed by Joseph Kosinski and visual effects were created by animation company Digital Domain. Kosinski and Digital Domain had collaborated previously on the Halo 3 "Starry Night" commercial. The trailer is set on the UNSC frigate Forward Unto Dawn during the opening events of Halo 4. It depicts the Master Chief being awakened from cryonic sleep by Cortana, as the remnants of the frigate drift towards Requiem. The trailer was short-listed in the Visual Effects and Design categories at the 2012 AICP Show and NEXT Awards.

On April 30, 2012, it was announced that a web series, titled Halo 4: Forward Unto Dawn, would play on Machinima Prime and Halo Waypoint during the weeks leading up to the release for Halo 4. The series debuted on October 5, 2012, and contained five 15-minute live action shorts. It was directed by Stewart Hendler and the project was Microsoft's largest investment in a live action promotion. The series is set in 2526, 31 years before the events of Halo 4 at the beginning of the Human-Covenant War. The plot is centered around the character Thomas Lasky, who appears in the video game, he is primarily portrayed by Australian actor Tom Green in the live action series. The series also ties in with the plot of the Halo 4 campaign and Spartan Ops mode. The Master Chief is featured in the latter part of the series, and is played by actor Daniel Cudmore.

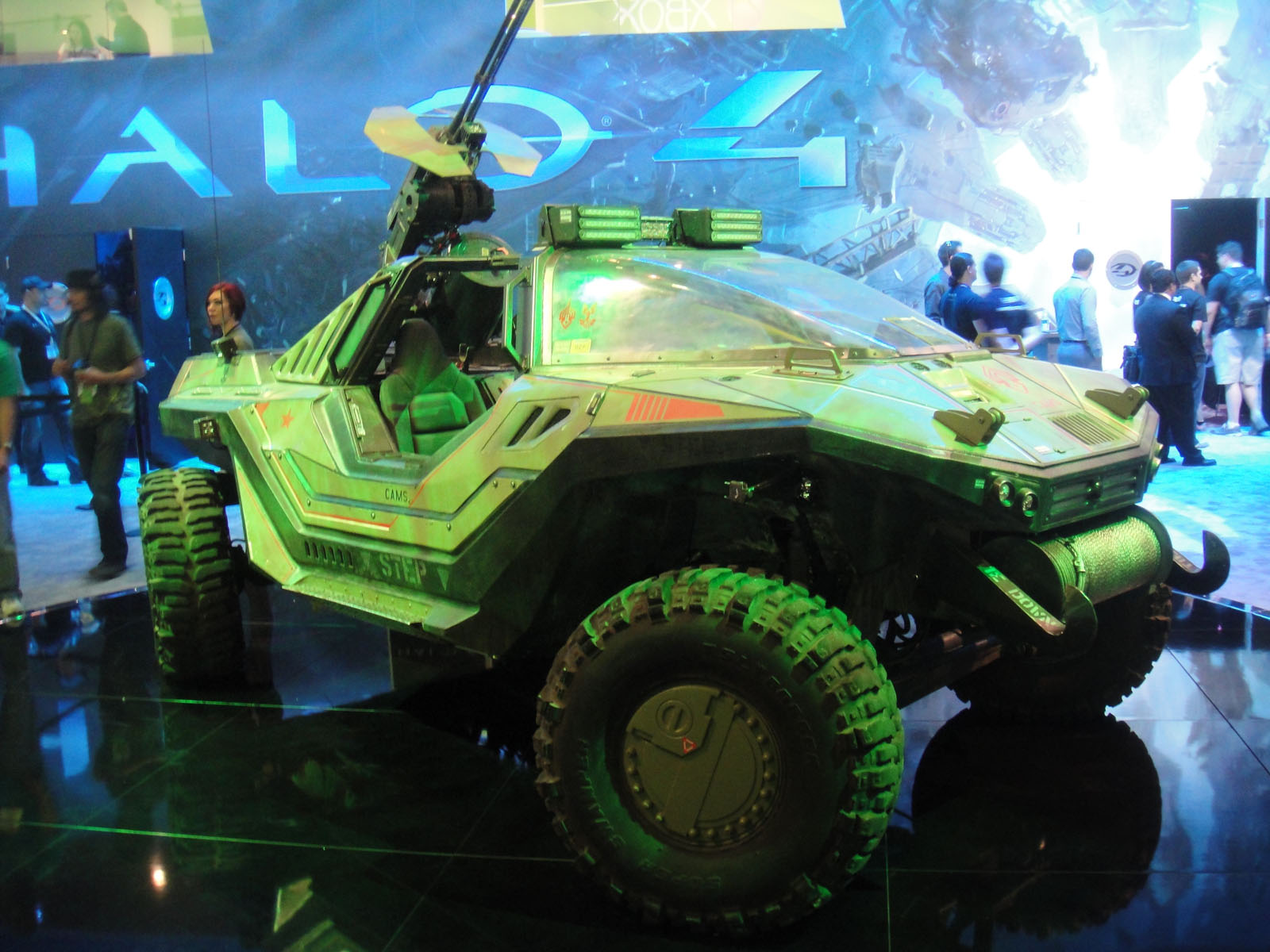
A full-size model of the Halo 4 Warthog at the Microsoft booth of E3 2012

At E3 2012, the presentation of Halo 4 was preceded with a live action segment called "The Commissioning". The video was directed by Nicolai Fuglsig and filmed over two and a half days, with four weeks of post-production and visual effects were added by Method Studios. Music in the trailer was scored by Neil Davidge. The video shows the UNSC Infinity vessel being pulled within the confines of the planet Requiem. Mark Rolston portrays Captain Andrew Del Rio in the live action video.

On October 18, 2012, the Halo 4 launch trailer, titled "Scanned", premiered on Late Night with Jimmy Fallon. The trailer was produced by David Fincher and directed by Tim Miller. The trailer was filmed in Prague and features both CGI and live action sequences. It shows Master Chief, bound by a force shield, being approached by an enemy. The enemy moves toward John, scanning his mind to find the source of his strength and search for weaknesses. A live action sequence proceeds with flashbacks of John's past; showing him being kidnapped as a child, the Spartan-II augmentation procedure, and him being suited into his MJOLNIR armor. The trailer then shows John attacking Promethean Knights, before returning to the scene of him bound and being faced by his enemy, the Didact. On October 23, 2012, the Halo 4 launch gameplay trailer was revealed; it featured segments of gameplay footage from the campaign and multiplayer.

In October 2012, visual effects company Framestore assisted advertising agency McCann London in producing live TV adverts for Halo 4. The adverts aired on November 9, 2012; they featured live data on how many people were playing Halo 4 online, correct to within five minutes of the broadcast.

== Release ==
Halo 4 was released in all territories except Japan on November 6, 2012; the Japanese version was released on November 8. Microsoft initially released the game in two separate retail versions, branded as "Standard" and "Limited" editions. The Limited Edition includes digital items for Xbox 360 avatars and in-game Spartan-IVs, as well as access to future downloadable content in the form of three competitive multiplayer map packs, containing a total of nine maps. It also includes a 90-minute extended version of the live action digital series, Halo 4: Forward Unto Dawn and a UNSC Infinity Briefing Packet. At launch, two Specializations were available to all players; only owners of the Halo 4 Limited Edition had access to all eight Specializations. However, 343 Industries later granted access to players, in certain countries, who participated in an online multiplayer match during the opening fortnight. For the remaining players, the Specializations were gradually unlocked in the months following launch.

Microsoft produced an Xbox 360 Limited Edition Halo 4 console bundle that launched alongside the game. The bundle features two custom-designed wireless Xbox 360 controllers, a standard edition of Halo 4, a wired headset, exclusive downloadable content and a Halo 4-themed Xbox 360 containing a 320GB hard drive. It was also announced that Microsoft would be releasing a standalone Xbox 360 Halo 4 Limited Edition wireless controller featuring a different design to the one included in the console bundle.

Microsoft reported that their security teams and law enforcement were investigating the possibility of Halo 4 content being leaked on the internet in October 2012. Jessica Shea, Community Manager at 343 Industries, warned fans to be wary of Halo 4 spoilers that were posted on the internet. O'Connor stated at New York Comic Con that leaks of the game and footage would not have any impact on how the game is released or marketed and that unlicensed uploading of high-profile games is inevitable.

Over ten thousand stores across forty countries opened for the midnight launch of Halo 4. On the evening before the release of the game, a fifty-foot diameter illuminated Didact glyph was flown by a helicopter over the River Thames in London, from the Greenwich Peninsula to Tower Bridge. The glyph was created by a team of over fifty designers, engineers and fabricators and took approximately eight weeks to design and construct. Following the release of the game, New Zealand censors declared many copies of Halo 4 illegal, after deciding to label it with an R13 rating, restricting it to buyers aged 13 and over. Many copies of the game had already gone on sale with an unrestricted M certificate, but these copies are in breach of the Films, Videos, and Publications Classification Act 1993.

On February 5, 2013, a digital version of the game was released via the Xbox Live Games on Demand service. A game of the year edition of Halo 4, featuring the season pass and Champion's Bundle DLC, pre-order bonuses, special avatar prop and the entire first season of Spartan Ops, was released on October 8.

=== Sales ===
Halo 4 grossed US$220 million on its launch day and $300 million in its opening week. The gross was a new record for the franchise, surpassing Halo: Reach's $200 million first-day gross. More than one million people played Halo 4 on Xbox Live within the first 24 hours of release. While Halo 4 debuted at the top of the UK Video Games Chart and became the eighteenth biggest launch ever in the UK, it failed to beat the week one sales records of Halo 3 and Halo: Reach. U.S. retail tracking firm NPD reported that Halo 4 was the second most sold retail video game of November 2012, the third most sold retail video game of December 2012, and the third most sold retail video game of the year. In the United States Halo 4 became the best-selling Microsoft Studios title for sales counted during respective launch years. In 2012, Halo 4 was the third most played game on Xbox Live based on average unique users per day.

== Post-release ==
Halo 4 supports downloadable content (DLC), which is available to download via the Xbox Live Marketplace. Three War Games map packs, each containing three maps, can be purchased individually, or bought together with the Halo 4 War Games Pass. The pass is included in the Limited Edition version of the game and is available to purchase on the Xbox Live Marketplace. The first map package, the "Crimson Map Pack", was released on December 10, 2012. Players who were awarded early access to Specializations received complimentary access to the Crimson Map Pack for a limited time. The "Majestic Map Pack" was released on February 25, 2013, followed by the "Castle Map Pack" on April 8. Forge Island, a map designed for Forge mode creations was made available at no cost to Xbox Live users on March 29. Microsoft released additional DLC on August 20 that could be purchased together as the Champions Bundle or separately. The three DLC packs include: the "Bullseye Pack" containing two multiplayer maps and early access to the Ricochet gametype; the "Steel Skin Pack", which offers steampunk-themed skins for weapons; and the "Infinity Armor Pack", which includes new armor for customizing the player's Spartan.

Aside from map packs, the game is supported by regular matchmaking playlist updates. These updates make playlist and balance changes, sandbox tweaks and fix minor glitches. A title update to fix various game issues and glitches was released in December 2012. Spartan Ops went on a mid-season break that December and resumed on January 21, 2013; the back half of the season was made available as a free download from the Xbox Live Marketplace. On January 29, an in-game search feature was implemented for Halo 4's file sharing system; a web version of the Halo 4 file browser was made available on February 27, 2013. On April 8, 343 Industries launched a competitive skill ranking system akin to that featured in Halo 2 and Halo 3.

During Spartan Ops' mid-season break, a free-to-enter Halo 4 tournament, titled Halo 4 Infinity Challenge, was launched by Microsoft in partnership with Virgin Gaming. Players could register on the Halo 4 Infinity Challenge website to participate in the tournament, giving them the opportunity to win various prizes. On July 3, 2013, 343 Industries announced a second tournament in partnership with Virgin Gaming, titled Halo 4 Global Championship. The tournament spanned a period of five weeks with a grand prize of $200,000. The tournament began on July 5 at RTX 2013, and on July 15 on Xbox Live. The tournament finals took place on September 1 at the 2013 Penny Arcade Expo; the event was streamed live and was hosted by Larry Hryb, Blair Herter, and Jessica Chobot.

Halo 4 was re-released as part of Halo: The Master Chief Collection for the Xbox One on November 11, 2014, and for Microsoft Windows on November 17, 2020. A sequel, Halo 5: Guardians, was released for the Xbox One on October 27, 2015.

== Reception ==
=== Critical reception ===
Reception

Aggregate score
Aggregator	Score
Metacritic	87/100

Review scores
Publication	Score
1Up.com	A−
Computer and Video Games	8/10
Edge	8/10
G4	4.5/5
Game Informer	9.25/10
GameSpot	9/10
GamesRadar+	4.5/5
IGN	9.8/10
Official Xbox Magazine (US)	9.5/10
Polygon	9.5/10

Halo 4 received mostly positive reviews from critics, with aggregate review website Metacritic assigning it an average score of 87 out of 100, based on 87 reviews. Many reviewers were impressed by 343 Industries' debut effort and considered it a worthy addition to the series. Ryan McCaffrey of IGN gave Halo 4 a very positive review, considering it to be the best game of the series to date and the best Xbox 360 game of 2012; he called it "a bar-raising triumph for the entire first-person shooter genre." Wesley Yin-Poole of Eurogamer remarked that although he was initially skeptical of changes being made to the formula, 343's greatest achievement was managing to stay true to what Halo is. He was enthusiastic to see what the developer would do with Halo 5 and expected them to deviate further while retaining the series' "magic".

Halo 4's campaign received widespread acclaim reception from critics. Reviewers enjoyed Master Chief's return as the protagonist, and the emotional connection between Master Chief and Cortana was highly praised. Mike Mahardy of Game Informer complimented the characterization improvements of Chief and Cortana, calling their evolved love story more "focused" and "relatable" to the player, in comparison to the "cloudy and impersonal" stories from the prior games of the franchise. GameSpot editor, Chris Watters, described the "thrilling and emotional return of Master Chief and Cortana" as the highlight of the game. GamesRadar maintained that the narrative was enthralling and the campaign's structure was much better than its predecessors. IGN's McCaffrey praised the game's lighting, movements, animations, and lauded the campaign for its pacing, "deftly mixing on-foot combat, vehicle sequences, quiet story moments, and key Chief-and-Cortana interactions." Although Neil Davidge's work on the musical composition was noted as a "bold shift", McCaffrey claimed the music seemed "complementary rather than additive."

1UP.com reviewer Jose Otero was critical of Halo 4's story, writing that the ending of the game "doesn't make a lot of sense". He also remarked that while the narrative tied the main plot lines together well, it was disappointing to see some of the smaller story points were ignored entirely. Both G4 and Official Xbox Magazine agreed that the plot became convoluted on occasions and might be difficult to understand for new players of the franchise. G4 reviewer, Adam Rosenburg, also stated that while the soundtrack had some memorable moments, he was disappointed that composer Neil Davidge had chosen to ditch the familiar theme of previous games. Michael Gapper of Computer and Video Games drew a comparison between Halo 4 and Halo 2. He stated that the hardware limitations of the Xbox 360 had negatively impacted Halo 4's campaign, in the same way that they had throttled Bungie's ambitions for Halo 2 on the original Xbox. He explained that although the game was visually stunning, this had detracted from the scale and spectacle that was present in Halo 3's campaign. He found the spaces within the campaign to be narrow and constrained which led to a lack of tactical options in encounters.

Competitive multiplayer received positive reception by critics. Chris Watters of GameSpot welcomed the new armor abilities and gameplay tweaks introduced in multiplayer. He praised the continuing robustness of Custom Game options and the accessibility of level editing in Forge. CVG's Gapper stated that the new scoring system alone made Halo 4 multiplayer the best in the series, emphasizing that recognition for assists and completing objective tasks was a positive change. Polygon writer, Arthur Gies, said that the new game mode Dominion was the best addition to Halo multiplayer since the introduction of Xbox Live. He also thought that the multiplayer component was more approachable to people outside of the core player-base without dumbing anything down.

Reception towards Spartan Ops was mixed to positive; some reviewers expressed their disappointment in Spartan Ops replacing the cooperative Firefight mode. Criticisms were aimed at the brevity of missions and lack of replay value. Despite any shortcomings, IGN said the mode was a must-play for the "incredible pre-episode cinematics" which open up "a number of interesting narrative possibilities for future episodes and seasons." Martin Robinson of Eurogamer complained about the repetition of environments within the first half of the season and noted that missions quickly become a chore. He felt that Spartan Ops was a "weak, bloated alternative" compared to Firefight. 1UP.com found that while the short length felt odd initially, the mode was still fun to play and offered more opportunities to play Halo cooperatively.

=== Accolades ===
List of pre-release awards and nominations
Year	Awards	Category	Winner/Nominee	Result	Ref.
2011	Spike TV Video Game Awards	Most Anticipated Game (viewer-voted)	Halo 4	Nominated	
2012	Golden Joystick Awards	One to Watch	Halo 4	Nominated	
2012	Game Critics Awards (at E3 2012)	Best of Show	Halo 4	Nominated	
2012	Game Critics Awards (at E3 2012)	Best Console Game	Halo 4	Nominated	
2012	Game Critics Awards (at E3 2012)	Best Action Game	Halo 4	Won	
2012	Game Critics Awards (at E3 2012)	Best Online Multiplayer Game	Halo 4	Won	
2012	IGN's Best of E3 2012 Awards	Best Overall Game	Halo 4	Nominated	
2012	IGN's Best of E3 2012 Awards	Best Xbox 360 Game	Halo 4	Won	
2012	IGN's Best of E3 2012 Awards	Best Action Game	Halo 4	Nominated	
2012	IGN's Best of E3 2012 Awards	Best Shooter	Halo 4	Won	

List of post-release awards and nominations
Year	Awards	Category	Winner/Nominee	Result	Ref.
2012	Spike TV Video Game Awards	Best Xbox 360 Game	Halo 4	Won	
2012	Spike TV Video Game Awards	Best Shooter	Halo 4	Nominated	
2012	Spike TV Video Game Awards	Best Multiplayer Game	Halo 4	Nominated	
2012	Spike TV Video Game Awards	Best Original Score	Halo 4	Nominated	
2012	Spike TV Video Game Awards	Best Graphics	Halo 4	Won	
2012	Spike TV Video Game Awards	Studio of the Year	343 Industries for Halo 4	Nominated	
2012	Spike TV Video Game Awards	Best Performance by a Human Female	Jen Taylor as Cortana	Nominated	
2012	Spike TV Video Game Awards	Character of the Year (viewer-voted)	Master Chief	Nominated	
2012	Inside Gaming Awards	Game of the Year	Halo 4	Won	
2012	Inside Gaming Awards	Best Competitive Multiplayer	Halo 4	Won	
2012	Inside Gaming Awards	Best Sound Design	Halo 4	Won	
2012	Inside Gaming Awards	Best Art Direction	Halo 4	Nominated	
2012	Inside Gaming Awards	Best Animation	Halo 4	Nominated	
2012	Inside Gaming Awards	Best Original Score	Halo 4	Nominated	
2012	Inside Gaming Awards	Best Game Cinematography	Halo 4	Nominated	
2012	Inside Gaming Awards	Best Character Design	Cortana	Nominated	
2012	GamesRadar	Shooter of the Year	Halo 4	Won	
2012	GamesRadar	Game of the Year	Halo 4	Nominated	
2012	X-Play's Best of 2012 Awards	Game of the Year	Halo 4	Nominated	
2012	X-Play's Best of 2012 Awards	Best Multiplayer Game	Halo 4	Nominated	
2012	X-Play's Best of 2012 Awards	Best Multiplayer Co-op Game	Halo 4	Nominated	
2012	X-Play's Best of 2012 Awards	Best Shooter	Halo 4	Won	
2012	X-Play's Best of 2012 Awards	Best Art Direction	Halo 4	Nominated	
2012	GameSpot's Best Games of 2012	Shooter of the Year	Halo 4	Won	
2012	GameSpot's Best Games of 2012	Xbox 360 Game of the Year	Halo 4	Nominated	
2012	GameSpot's Best Games of 2012	Overall Game of the Year	Halo 4	Nominated	
2012	IGN's Best of 2012	Best Overall Game	Halo 4	Nominated	
2012	IGN's Best of 2012	Best Xbox 360 Shooter Game	Halo 4	Won	
2012	IGN's Best of 2012	Best Xbox 360 Graphics	Halo 4	Won	
2012	IGN's Best of 2012	Best Xbox 360 Sound	Halo 4	Won	
2012	IGN's Best of 2012	Best Xbox 360 Story	Halo 4	Nominated	
2012	IGN's Best of 2012	Best Xbox 360 Multiplayer Game	Halo 4	Won	
2012	IGN's Best of 2012	Best Xbox 360 Game	Halo 4	Won	
2012	IGN's Best of 2012	Best Overall Shooter	Halo 4	Nominated	
2012	IGN's Best of 2012	Best Overall Multiplayer Game	Halo 4	Won	
2012	IGN's Best of 2012	Best Overall Graphics	Halo 4	Won	
2012	IGN's Best of 2012	Best Overall Sound	Halo 4	Won	
2012	OXM's Game of the Year 2012 Awards	Game of the Year	Halo 4	Nominated	
2012	OXM's Game of the Year 2012 Awards	Best Shooter	Halo 4	Won	
2012	OXM's Game of the Year 2012 Awards	Best Multiplayer	Halo 4	Nominated	
2012	OXM's Game of the Year 2012 Awards	Best Villain	The Didact	Nominated	
2012	OXM's Game of the Year 2012 Awards	Developer of the Year	343 Industries for Halo 4	Won	
2013	16th Annual D.I.C.E. Awards	Action Game of the Year	Halo 4	Nominated	
2013	16th Annual D.I.C.E. Awards	Outstanding Achievement in Art Direction	Halo 4	Nominated	
2013	16th Annual D.I.C.E. Awards	Outstanding Achievement in Connectivity	Halo 4	Won	
2013	16th Annual D.I.C.E. Awards	Outstanding Achievement in Online Gameplay	Halo 4	Nominated	
2013	16th Annual D.I.C.E. Awards	Outstanding Achievement in Visual Engineering	Halo 4	Won	
2013	16th Annual D.I.C.E. Awards	Outstanding Character Performance - Male or Female	Cortana	Nominated	
2013	MPSE Golden Reel Awards	Best Sound Editing: Computer Interactive Entertainment	Halo 4	Nominated	
2013	9th British Academy Video Games Awards	Action	Halo 4	Nominated	
2013	9th British Academy Video Games Awards	Artistic Achievement	Halo 4	Nominated	
2013	9th British Academy Video Games Awards	Audio Achievement	Halo 4	Nominated	
2013	9th British Academy Video Games Awards	Online – Multiplayer	Halo 4	Nominated	
2013	13th Annual Game Developers Choice Awards	Best Audio	Halo 4	Nominated	
2013	13th Annual Game Developers Choice Awards	Best Technology	Halo 4	Nominated	
2013	13th Annual Game Developers Choice Awards	Best Visual Arts	Halo 4	Nominated	
2013	Golden Joystick Awards	Game of the Year	Halo 4	Nominated	
2013	Golden Joystick Awards	Best Storytelling	Halo 4	Nominated	
2013	Golden Joystick Awards	Best Multiplayer	Halo 4	Nominated	
2013	Golden Joystick Awards	Best Visual Design	Halo 4	Nominated	
2013	Golden Joystick Awards	Best Gaming Moment	Halo 4 − Cortana's fate	Nominated	
2013	Golden Joystick Awards	Studio of the Year	343 Industries	Nominated	
