= WGN =

WGN may refer to:

- "World's Greatest Newspaper", former slogan of the Chicago Tribune and the namesake for the WGN broadcasting outlets in Chicago, Illinois.
  - WGN (AM), a radio station (720 AM) licensed to Chicago, Illinois, United States
  - WGN-TV, a television station (channel 9.1 virtual/19 digital) licensed to Chicago, Illinois, United States
  - WGN America, a cable television network based in Chicago, Illinois, United States
- Shaoyang Wugang Airport, IATA code WGN
- White Gaussian noise
  - Additive white Gaussian noise
- The ICAO airline designator for Western Global Airlines
- WGN, Journal of the International Meteor Organization
- WorldGaming Network
- Wigan North Western railway station, located on the West Coast Main Line (station code WGN)
