= Josh Holmes (video game designer) =

Canadian video game designer (born 1978)

- Born: April 7, 1978 (age 48); Vancouver, British Columbia, Canada
- Occupation: Video game designer
- Notable work: Turok; Halo: Reach; Halo 4; Halo 5: Guardians

Josh Holmes is a Canadian video game producer and designer. He is known for his work at 343 Industries, the studio responsible for the Halo franchise. Holmes was born and raised in British Columbia. After pursuing a career in acting, Holmes turned to games development and worked for years at Electronic Arts, rising from games tester to producer. After leaving Electronic Arts, he co-founded Propaganda Games, before joining 343 Industries in 2009.

At 343 Industries, Holmes worked on Halo: Reach, before becoming creative director for Halo 4 after replacing the previous director. For Halo 5: Guardians, he served as a studio head. Holmes left 343 in 2016 to pursue a career in independent game development, and founded Midwinter Entertainment.

== Biography ==
=== Early career ===
Holmes was born and grew up in British Columbia and attended Kitsilano Secondary School in Vancouver. He several years pursuing a career as a film actor in Los Angeles, including filming a television pilot. Frustrated by trying to make ends meet with side jobs, he looked for a career that interested him as much as acting. Having been a life-long gamer, he looked into game development. Interviewing with Electronic Arts, Holmes recalled he told them that he planned on being a game designer within five years.

Holmes got his start working at Electronic Arts' campus in Burnaby, Canada, in 1995. He served as a game tester for sports games before being hired for game production. While there, he co-created the NBA Street series. His passion for storytelling was demonstrated when he worked on NBA Street as the lead designer, ensuring that even a sports game had a plot.

When Holmes was tasked with helping a troubled wrestling game project, he and the team brainstormed "the concept of 'urban culture meets fighting and wrestling.'" The resulting game was Def Jam Vendetta, which was a critical and commercial success. After release, many ideas remained for another game, and early on in development the team decided the gameplay would move away from the wrestling found in the original and be shaped by combat from other fighting games and genres. In 2004, after finishing the sequel, Def Jam: Fight for NY, Holmes left Electronic Arts.

Holmes co-founded Revolution Interactive, later Propaganda Games. Holmes pitched Disney Interactive on an adult-focused game studio, and Disney acquired the company shortly after it opened. While at Propaganda, Holmes worked on the reboot of the Turok first-person shooter game series, as well as a scrapped Pirates of the Caribbean game. In 2008, Holmes left Propaganda Games and Disney Interactive.

=== 343 Industries ===
Holmes joined 343 Industries in 2009 and was an executive producer on the Halo website Halo Waypoint and Halo: Reach. Holmes stated he was drawn to the challenge of working at 343 Industries because it was founded specifically to become the caretaker of the Halo series; only around 25 people worked there when he joined. Holmes said he and his team were "blown away" by the number of people accessing the Halo Waypoint. As part of the development of Halo: Reach, Holmes worked with previous Halo developer Bungie. One of Holmes' favorite aspects of Reach was the "melancholy feel you had that you were understanding the stakes of the challenge and things weren't necessarily going to end up all rosy".

Holmes replaced Ryan Payton as creative director on Halo 4. Holmes said his job was to take the ideas Payton had developed and translate them into concrete development goals. Early on, Holmes recalled that the developers created a slice of the game that was almost an imitation of Bungie's work on Halo, and the team decided to move beyond that to try new things.

Holmes described his design philosophy as making gameplay accessible to as many people as possible, including those who are new to established games such as Halo. Part of the redesign of Halo that Holmes initiated was the make the game faster-paced, making both Master Chief and his enemies move more quickly, and include much larger game spaces for characters to explore. Visual changes included rebuilding all the characters to optimize their performances. An aspect of Halo 4's design that was preserved was the presenting of challenges to players, but not forcing it upon them and making the game linear. Holmes worked on introducing enemy cues and unique behaviors gradually and individually so that players had to fight creatively and effectively. Single player mode was imagined to be a training ground for multiplayer, and for success there to lead to continued membership in the Halo fan community. The game also was built to have a deeper resonance for players who had played previous games or read the expanded universe materials. After four years of designing Halo 4 and playing the game for thousands of hours, Holmes stated he still loves the game, particularly due to the work on the story and the freedom players have to "play with the world and explore".

After Halo 4, Holmes took a break to write out some ideas for the direction of the next game. Tim Longo took over creative director duties for Halo 5: Guardians, while Holmes served as a producer on the title.

=== Midwinter Entertainment ===
In November 2016, Holmes announced that he would be departing 343 Industries to pursue a career in indie game development. Holmes founded Midwinter Entertainment, which was developing its first game, the free-to-play Scavengers; Midwinter was acquired by Behaviour Interactive, and Scavengers was shut down without a full release in 2022.

== Works ==
- NBA Live '98 (1997) − assistant producer
- NBA Live '99 (1998) − assistant producer, designer
- NBA Live 2000 (1999) − assistant producer, designer
- NBA Street (2001) − lead designer
- Def Jam Vendetta (2003) − lead designer, producer
- Def Jam: Fight for NY (2004) − lead designer, producer
- Turok (2008) − studio general manager
- Halo Waypoint (2009) − executive producer
- Halo: Reach (2010) − executive producer
- Halo 4 (2012) − creative director
- Halo 5: Guardians (2015) – studio head, internal development
