= Halo 5: Guardians =

2015 video game

- Cover art featuring Spartan Locke (left) and Master Chief (right), with a Guardian rising in the background
- Developer: 343 Industries
- Publisher: Microsoft Studios
- Director: Tim Longo
- Producer: Chris Lee
- Composer: Kazuma Jinnouchi
- Series: Halo
- Platform: Xbox One
- Release: October 27, 2015
- Genre: First-person shooter
- Modes: Single-player, multiplayer

Halo 5: Guardians is a 2015 first-person shooter game developed by 343 Industries and published by Microsoft Studios for the Xbox One. Set in the 26th century, the plot follows two fireteams of human supersoldiers: Blue Team, led by Master Chief, and Fireteam Osiris, led by Spartan Locke. When Blue Team goes absent without leave to track down the artificial intelligence construct Cortana, Master Chief's loyalty is called into question and Fireteam Osiris is sent to retrieve him. Players fight enemies with an armament of different weaponry and vehicles in story-based and multiplayer modes, including a larger-format 24-person mode called Warzone.

343 Industries started to plan Halo 5 shortly after the release of its predecessor, Halo 4. In late 2012, the team set goals for the game, including larger campaign and multiplayer areas. Different departments worked collaboratively to build off each other's work for the campaign mode. The move to the Xbox One console allowed the development of the Warzone mode alongside traditional multiplayer modes, part of 343 Industries' focus on allowing for different play styles. Its game engine dynamically adjusts its resolution to maintain a frame rate of 60 frames per second; the focus on performance meant that offline capabilities or local networking were not included.

Microsoft announced the game at E3 2013. The game sold five million units within three months and is the seventh-best selling game for the Xbox One. Upon release, Halo 5 received positive reviews from critics, with praise directed at its gameplay, visuals, level design and multiplayer modes. However, the game's single-player campaign met divided responses, with criticism directed at its story, writing, and ending. A sequel, Halo Infinite, was released on December 8, 2021.

== Gameplay ==
Halo 5: Guardians gameplay. The player character aims a Battle Rifle between two Promethean Soldiers.

Halo 5: Guardians is a first-person shooter game. Players assume the role of powerful "Spartan" supersoldiers with a host of abilities, and use a combination of guns, grenades, and melee attacks in story-based campaign and multiplayer modes. Players can sprint indefinitely, as opposed to the sprint limits in previous games in the series, though their damage-absorbing shield will not recharge in multiplayer; at top speed, the player character can slide across the ground or charge into an enemy. A thruster pack allows for a speed boost or lateral movements, and players can clamber up ledges to reach higher ground. Every weapon can be aimed while zoomed in, similar to iron sights; sustaining fire will knock players out of the zoomed view. By zooming while airborne, players briefly hover; while aloft, players can target the ground for an area-of-effect attack. A number of new weapons are also introduced in the game.

The game's campaign mode casts the player in the roles of two protagonists, the Master Chief and Jameson Locke. Each character is accompanied by a persistent fireteam of non-player character Spartans—Blue Team for Chief, and Fireteam Osiris for Locke—who are present at all times. During cooperative play, other human players assume control of these Spartans, who each have different loadouts and attributes. Players can direct computer-controlled fireteam members via the d-pad to perform actions such as picking up a weapon, getting into a vehicle, or prioritizing a selected enemy. If a Spartan takes too much damage, they enter an incapacitated state, and can be revived by another fireteam member before dying. The game's difficulty scales to compensate for the number of human players.

Xbox Live multiplayer features a variety of competitive and cooperative game modes. Established four-versus-four arena modes like deathmatch or capture the flag return. New to Halo 5 is Warzone, a 24-player game mode that pit two teams against each other. In addition to fighting the enemy team, players can earn points by capturing locations on the map or defeating computer-controlled enemies; the game ends either when one team destroys the other team's home base, or they earn 1000 points. Players earn requisition points over the course of a match, which can be used to summon weapons, vehicles or powerups into the map based on rewards the player has earned from requisition packs (REQ packs). These packs can be earned in-game via a progression system, or else bought with real-world currency. In ranked play, players complete a series of placement matches to determine their skill rank ratings, which can go up or down based on winning or losing games.

Halo 5 features a level editor called Forge, where players can create their own multiplayer maps. The mode has a new control scheme compared to Halo 4, and new capabilities including scripting tools that can be applied to game objects. Unlike previous first-person shooters in the Halo franchise, Halo 5 does not feature any offline multiplayer capabilities, like split-screen cooperative campaign and multiplayer modes, and has no local networking options. The game was supported via the Halo Waypoint website with player statistics tracking and additional features such as Spartan Companies, where players could band together in groups of up to 100 players and work on completing in-game challenges to unlock cosmetic rewards.

== Synopsis ==
=== Setting and characters ===
Halo 5: Guardians takes place in the year 2558, eight months after the events of Halo 4. The game follows two fireteams of supersoldiers of the United Nations Space Command (UNSC). Blue Team is led by Master Chief Petty Officer John-117 and is composed of his fellow Spartan-II supersoldiers: Linda-058, an elite sniper; Kelly-087, a scout; and Frederic-104, a hand-to-hand combat specialist. The members of Blue Team are among the last Spartan-IIs left alive. Fireteam Osiris is formed from Spartan-IVs, a newer generation of Spartans. Osiris is led by Jameson Locke, a former assassin and tracker of the Office of Naval Intelligence (ONI). The other members of Fireteam Osiris are Holly Tanaka, a combat technician, engineer, and survivor of a Covenant attack on her planet; Olympia Vale, a political liaison and signals intelligence agent who can speak many alien dialects; and Edward Buck, a veteran trooper who was a main character in Halo 3: ODST.

Supporting characters include the UNSC ship Infinity's commanding officer, Captain Thomas Lasky; Spartan-IV commander Sarah Palmer; Roland, Infinity's shipboard artificial intelligence (AI); and Catherine Halsey, a scientist who created the SPARTAN-II program. Other returning characters include the Arbiter Thel 'Vadam, who leads the Sangheili species against a Covenant faction led by Jul 'Mdama. Cortana, Master Chief's AI companion who was presumed dead after the events of Halo 4, also returns.

=== Plot ===
Fireteam Osiris is deployed to the planet Kamchatka to retrieve Halsey amidst a battle between Jul 'Mdama's Covenant and Forerunner Prometheans. The team kills 'Mdama and retrieves Halsey, who claims to have information on a series of devastating attacks on several human worlds. Elsewhere, Master Chief leads Blue Team on a mission to secure a derelict research station; the arrival of a Covenant fleet prompts Blue Team to scuttle the station instead. Master Chief receives a cryptic message from Cortana, directing him to Meridian, a human colony world. Master Chief is ordered to return to Infinity, but he and Blue Team disobey orders and set out after Cortana.

Captain Lasky declares Blue Team absent without leave; Halsey believes that Cortana's survival through the use of Forerunner technology makes her unpredictable and untrustworthy. Fireteam Osiris is sent to Meridian to bring back Blue Team. On the planet, they find the colonists under attack by Promethean forces. Following Blue Team's trail, they encounter the Warden Eternal, a Promethean serving as Cortana's enforcer. After temporarily defeating the Warden, Osiris catches up to Blue Team, ordering them to stand down. Chief bests Locke in hand-to-hand combat and Blue Team boards a Guardian, a colossal Forerunner construct built as planetary enforcers. Osiris barely escapes the colony's collapse as the Guardian emerges from underground and teleports away to the Forerunner planet Genesis, where John and Cortana reunite. Cortana says that her terminal condition was cured by the same Forerunner technology that had saved her.

Osiris is deployed to the Sangheili homeworld of Sanghelios, where they plan to use the Guardian buried there to follow Blue Team. Sanghelios is embroiled in a civil war between the Arbiter's forces and the remains of 'Mdama's army; Osiris helps Arbiter assault the Covenant's last stronghold and board the Guardian before it disappears.

On Genesis, Osiris encounters the planet's caretaker, the AI 031 Exuberant Witness, who allies with them to stop Cortana. Osiris catches up to Blue Team, who reveal that Cortana is planning on using the Guardians to achieve galactic peace through forcible disarmament. Master Chief, aware of the devastation that Cortana's plan will cause, attempts to convince Cortana to stand down. She refuses and confines Blue Team in a Forerunner prison to prevent them from interfering with her plan. Osiris manages to transfer control of Genesis back to Exuberant, who frees Blue Team before Cortana leaves the planet. AIs across the galaxy begin swearing allegiance to Cortana and her plans. Cortana locates Infinity and prepares to disable it, but Lasky has the ship retreat until they can develop a way to combat Cortana. With Blue Team recovered, Osiris returns to Sanghelios to reunite the Spartans with the injured Commander Palmer, Arbiter, and Halsey.

In a post-credits scene, unlocked via completing the campaign on the Legendary difficulty, a Forerunner Halo installation powers up while Cortana hums.

== Development ==
Before Halo 4's release in November 2012, 343 Industries creative director Josh Holmes began looking for his replacement for the next Halo title. Tim Longo joined as creative director in late 2012, with Halo 5 a few months into preproduction. General manager Bonnie Ross recalled that after Halo 4 the team spent a lot of time discussing where they wanted to take the Halo series, reflecting on feedback from fans about what they did and did not like. Longo and game leads David Berger and Chris Lee laid out the studio's vision for the next game from a creative and technical standpoint, setting key goals to focus on: utilizing the Xbox One's hardware and Microsoft's cloud infrastructure for larger campaign and multiplayer spaces, deeper player investment systems, and a 60 frames per second (FPS) frame rate.

Longo considered moving from 30 to 60 FPS quadrupled the amount of development work required, especially as the team also wanted the larger scale to environments. To maintain a 60 FPS frame rate, Halo 5's engine dynamically lowers the resolution at which the game is rendered during graphically intensive scenes, which are then upscaled back to the game's native resolution of 1080p. To help achieve this, 343 Industries made extensive use of Havok software. Eagerness to take advantage of the hardware sometimes came with drawbacks; the art team built fully animated cacti that responded to gunfire and blanketed the campaign maps with the succulents. Ultimately, they proved to be the largest single technical problem in the game and had to be removed. The focus on performance meant that split-screen play, which had been in all previous Halo games, was dropped.

Holmes stated that the development team wanted Halo 5's multiplayer to provide gameplay variety and support different play styles. In the game's Arena mode, 343 Industries decided to exclude a loadout system so they could encourage the concept of a level playing field that was present in earlier Halo games. The mode was inspired by older multiplayer shooters such as Quake. The Warzone game mode was originally conceived in 2012 with a small demo set up as a four-versus-four player match with AI controlled enemies defending an objective; the studio had wanted to implement such a mode with Halo 4 on the Xbox 360 but was unable to achieve their vision on the hardware.

=== Campaign ===
One of the main goals for Halo 5 was to expand the universe with new and returning characters and settings. Longo was a fan of squad-based gameplay experiences, and the team wanted to introduce more main characters besides Master Chief, and explore the character through other perspectives. "One of the early thoughts was kind of throwing the Chief paradigm a little bit on its head, to have some mystery enshrouding him and what his motivations are, like we'd not seen before," Longo recalled, setting up the idea of a hunt for Master Chief across multiple locations, with alternating viewpoints similar to Halo 2. The studio wanted to contrast Master Chief and Blue Team with another team of characters. 343 Industries initially considered making this group Fireteam Majestic, characters from the Halo 4 episodic series Spartan Ops. When Longo joined as creative director and the rest of the story developed, the developers decided to create a new fireteam, initially composed of three Spartans dubbed "Smith", "Jones", and "Brown", with Halo 4 characters Gabriel Thorne and Sarah Palmer also considered as part of the team. The narrative team decided Smith would be a former intelligence agent, a cross of James Bond and Lara Croft, while the still-unnamed Jones (later Vesper) would be an expert in alien languages. Once part of the story became set on the planet Meridian, the narrative team decided that one of the Spartans should have grown up outside the UNSC and survived the destruction of her home planet to act as a conduit for understanding Meridian; now known as Spartan Song, this character replaced Palmer. When Thorne's voice actor, Ethan Peck, was unavailable due to scheduling conflicts, 343 Industries decided to replace his character on the team roster rather than recast the role. Other suggestions included an entirely new Spartan or another member of Blue Team, but the developers decided on fan favorite Buck after Nathan Fillion became available. Smith became Locke, Vesper and Song became Vale and Tanaka, and Fireteam Osiris took shape after more than two years of changes.

In contrast to the push for larger set pieces, 343 Industries wanted characterization to remain important, with the difference between the veteran Blue Team and newly-formed Osiris providing a contrast. Speaking about Cortana's fate in Halo 4, franchise development director Frank O'Connor stated that Halo 4's story was focused on the effect that Cortana's sacrifice and loss would have on the Master Chief. He also noted that this effect would be reflected in Halo 5: Guardians, with a story that explores how the Master Chief copes with loss and memories.

The team set out to make a different Halo campaign than the pattern of previous Halo games. Rather than having the level design team build out the levels and then have the art and character teams do their own passes, the various teams had frequent meetings to react to and build off each other's work. Holmes recalled that while during Halo 4 343 Industries had been building up its team simultaneously with developing the game, with Halo 5 the team focused on establishing the core gameplay foundation early on. Combat was focused around spaces called "bowls", with enough action for four players in a fireteam, as well as offering different tactical options to defeat opponents. The team prototyped a number of Spartan abilities that ultimately were pared back, including a double jump. To encourage players to use the new Spartan abilities, the level designers hid secrets like better weapons, alternate routes, and audio logs in spots only reachable by boosting over gaps or knocking down cracked walls. On the departure from the Xbox 360 hardware, Ross noted that the Xbox One allowed 343 Industries to broaden the game's scope, as its matchmaking and four-player online campaign co-op modes utilize the console's dedicated server support. The co-op player count prompted the studio to work at increasing the number of enemies and sense of scale. To support the drop-in/drop-out co-op, 343 Industries built a dynamic AI system for the fireteam companions to assist the player when a session is played alone.

=== Art ===
A team of roughly 150 artists worked on Halo 5. The art director for Halo 4, Kenneth Scott, stepped down from his role in January 2014. He was succeeded by Nicolas "Sparth" Bouvier, a concept artist who joined Microsoft in 2009. Bouvier described the early stages of developing artistic concepts as akin to sculpting from marble: "[we] start with a very loose idea that has trickled down from the writers or studio creative director and begin chipping away at the problem." Concept artist Kory Lynn Hubbell recalled that the game's art had to be justified. "If there's no plausible story behind something, it shouldn't be there," he said, recalling that an original plan for a fountain on the mining world of Meridian was changed to a holographic tree, to reflect the desire to simulate nature in the barren landscape. The art team took inspiration from the US space program to science fiction films to inform the look of the game, trying to create unique looks for characters and locations that still felt grounded in reality and remain connected to previous Halo games. Most of the existing assets had to be rebuilt or redesigned for the high-fidelity graphics.

343's artist and designers focused on differentiating the members of each Spartan fireteam through their design. As Locke's mission is to find Master Chief, Bouvier recalled "he reflects that visually. The design of his armor is very nonintrusive. He doesn't have any bright tones. He's gray and dark to amplify the very nondisruptive nature of his armor." In comparison, Vale's armor was sleeker to reflect her agility, and painted magenta to imply nervousness and aggression.

As with the previous game, Halo 5 used motion capture to animate characters. To record the performances, 343 Industries used a 2,500-square-foot stage and fifty cameras, along with a 3D tracking system called OptiTrack.

=== Audio ===
Sataro Tojima was the audio director for Halo 5: Guardians, with Japanese composer Kazuma Jinnouchi composing the original score. Jinnouchi had worked remotely with Neil Davidge on the score for Halo 4, but came to the project only a year before release. In comparison, he said Halo 5 was an easier, collaborative process as he was now in-house and with the project from the beginning.

With the goal of making the audio design for Halo 5 more immersive, 343 Industries went on trips to capture ambient sound from hot springs in Iceland, the clattering sound of materials dropping from an elevated crane for explosions and the destruction of objects, and the boom of real firearms. To capture accurate sound of gunfire in urban environments, the team shut down part of a Warner Bros. lot. For the first time in Halo's multiplayer, teammates can make voiced callouts. The Covenant have conversations with each other. The audio team worked with the AI and narrative departments when developing the fireteams in the campaign to create sophisticated chatter and conversations during firefights and in lulls between action.

Tojima recalled that while Halo fans liked the new sounds of Halo 4 in isolation, they missed the music not having enough of "a classic Halo aesthetic", adding that the music was less memorable in-game in part due to how it was incorporated. For Halo 5, they wanted to honor the legacy of the previous games while using it as a springboard for a new approach. Jinnouchi started composing the score by reading the script, calling the music story-driven. A piece representing Locke was the first music composed for the game. To differentiate Chief from Locke, Jinnouchi used different chord progressions and switched the key between major and minor, to suggest ambiguity as to whether the character was good or bad. A larger emphasis was placed on the use of a choir in Halo 5: Guardians' music compared to Halo 4's. The music was recorded at Abbey Road Studios in London and the choir was recorded at the Rudolfinum in Prague. Jinnouchi wanted to reintroduce the original Halo theme in Halo 5: Guardians, so he composed his own interpretation of the piece. The game's soundtrack was released on October 30, 2015, in four editions: a digital release, physical compact disc, vinyl, and limited edition featuring double compact discs, vinyl, and extra multimedia content.

== Promotion ==
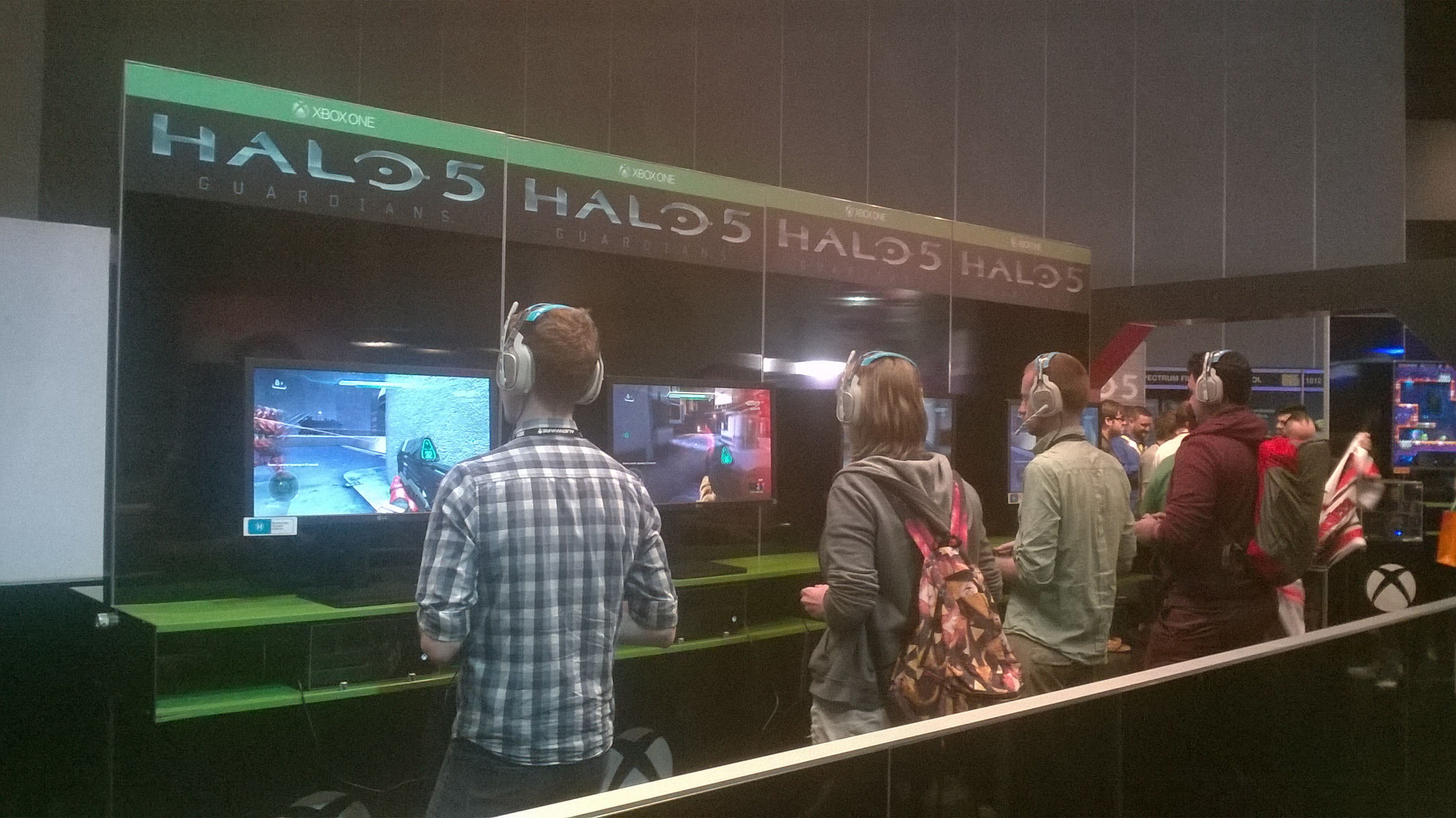
Halo 5: Guardians demo booths at PAX Australia 2015

At Electronic Entertainment Expo (E3) 2013, Microsoft announced a new, untitled addition to the Halo series with a trailer showing Master Chief. After E3, Xbox executive Phil Spencer said the previously announced "Reclaimer Trilogy", of which Halo 4 had been the first entry, had been expanded into a larger saga, explaining that the developers did not want to limit the story to just three games. The title and 2015 release date were confirmed in May 2014 as an Xbox One exclusive. Live-action advertisements on television revealed the October 27 release date. Campaign gameplay was shown at E3 2015. The development of the game was covered in a documentary series called The Sprint, which debuted on the Xbox One's Halo Channel and was later uploaded to YouTube.

Halo 5 had a multiplayer beta, which ran from December 29, 2014, through January 18, 2015. Players obtained access to the beta through purchasing Halo: The Master Chief Collection. The beta was a sample of Halo 5's arena gameplay, featuring three modes, seven maps and eleven weapons. The development team wanted to launch a beta as early as possible so that players could give feedback, which was used to make refinements to gameplay and adjustments to maps., The beta ran on dedicated servers. 343 treated the beta as a promise of a better launch for Halo 5 after the technical issues that plagued The Master Chief Collection.

Tie-in merchandise included Halo 5-themed Minecraft skins. Microsoft offered a limited-edition Halo 5-themed Xbox One bundle, with the console etched with Halo graphics and blue details, and the gamepad being themed after Spartan Locke's armor; a separate Master Chief-themed gamepad was also produced. Halo 5 was also marketed in sports events: Major League Soccer club Seattle Sounders FC wore jerseys with the game's ads; and Dale Earnhardt Jr. and Jamie McMurray drove in the NASCAR competition in Halo 5-themed cars. One fan in Australia was tapped to play the game from a helicopter while an aerial screen broadcast the gameplay from 2,000 feet up.

=== Hunt the Truth ===
On March 22, 2015, Microsoft launched Hunt the Truth, an audioplay similar to radio series such as This American Life. The first season followed the investigations of fictional journalist and war photographer Benjamin Giraud (voiced by Keegan-Michael Key), who investigates the Master Chief's background. Giraud discovers that the official story of Master Chief's origins are false, and attempts to expose the coverup.

The first season was highly successful, drawing an audience of 6.7 million listeners on iTunes and winning Hunt the Truth's ad agency a Clio Award. A second season of the podcast began September 22, 2015, focusing upon the view point of ONI Agent Maya Sankar (Janina Gavankar), returning undercover as FERO, to investigate unidentified attacks on human colonies.

== Release ==
Halo 5 released worldwide on October 27, 2015. In the United States, it was the first shooter in the franchise to receive a Teen rating from the Entertainment Software Rating Board, instead of a Mature rating. Microsoft executive Aaron Greenberg felt that the M ratings on previous installments were surprising given the comparative lack of graphic violence, but that the Teen rating gave Halo 5 a larger potential audience. The game shipped in a standard edition, limited edition, and collector's edition. The limited edition came with a REQ bundle, dossiers on the game's characters, the Fall of Reach film, a statue of a Guardian, and a "steelbook" metal case. The collector's edition contained the limited edition extras, plus a commemorative statue of Master Chief and Agent Locke. The collector's edition comes with a digital code rather than a physical disc; fan feedback led Microsoft to offer a limited-time free trade-in program so buyers could have a physical disc instead. A Windows PC version of the game's map editing tool and multiplayer, Halo 5: Forge, was released for Windows 10 on September 8, 2016.

First-week global sales of Halo 5 software and hardware totaled more than US$400 million, making it the biggest Halo launch in Xbox history. It was also the best-selling digital title. Within its first five days of release, Halo 5 was the best-selling game of October in the United States, according to NPD Group, which tracks physical sales from retailers. In November, Halo 5 was the eighth best selling game according to NPD's figures. It was the ninth best-selling game of 2015 in the United States.

Halo 5: Guardians was the eleventh bestselling retail game during its first week of release in Japan, with 7,455 physical copies being sold. In the United Kingdom, Halo 5 debuted on the top of the sales charts as measured by Chart-Track, besting the week's other new release, Assassin's Creed Syndicate. It outsold previous Halo release The Master Chief Collection by 50% in its first week, though its sales were lower than previous major Halo releases. The following week sales decreased 78 percent, and Halo 5 was displaced from the top of the charts by Call of Duty: Black Ops III. The game was the tenth best selling title of 2015 in Australia. Frank O'Connor said that the game sold 5 million copies in the first three months of its release.

=== Updates ===
Halo 5 was supported by free post-release content updates that added new features, weapons, and multiplayer maps. Holmes explained that the studio did not want to segregate the player base by distributing maps as paid downloadable content.

Update name	Release date	Additions	Ref.
Battle of Shadow and Light	November 18, 2015	Big Team Battle (BTB) game mode, new player customization options, REQs	
Cartographer's Gift	December 16, 2015	Forge mode, advanced controller settings, new player customization options, maps, and REQs	
Infinity's Armory	January 27, 2016	New maps and REQs	
Hammerstorm	February 24, 2016	New game modes, new map, new REQs	
Ghosts of Meridian	March 6, 2016	New maps and REQs, Forge additions, balance updates	
Memories of Reach	May 16, 2016	Infection game mode, new REQs, matchmaking preferences customization	
Hog Wild (REQ Drop)	May 27, 2016	New REQs	
Warzone Firefight	June 29, 2016	Campaign Score Attack and Warzone Firefight game modes, new maps and REQs, new Forge canvas	
Anvil's Legacy	September 8, 2016	New maps and REQs	
Monitor's Bounty	December 8, 2016	Custom Games Browser, Observer Mode, new REQs, new Warzone Firefight maps, bug fixes, balance changes	
Overtime	November 2, 2017	Enhanced for Xbox One X, Oddball game mode, Local Server, New commendations, weapon tuning	

== Reception ==
Reception

Aggregate score
Aggregator	Score
Metacritic	84/100

Review scores
Publication	Score
Destructoid	7/10
Electronic Gaming Monthly	9/10
Famitsu	10/10, 9/10, 9/10, 10/10
Game Informer	8.75/10
GameRevolution	4.5/5
GameSpot	8/10
GamesRadar+	4/5
GamesTM	6/10
GameTrailers	9/10
Giant Bomb	4/5
IGN	9/10
Official Xbox Magazine (UK)	4/5
Polygon	9/10
VideoGamer.com	9/10
VentureBeat	83/100

Halo 5: Guardians received an aggregated score of 84 out of 100 on Metacritic based on 101 reviews, indicating "generally favorable reviews". Arthur Gies, writing for Polygon, wrote that 343 Industries had much to prove with Halo 5 after Halo 4's online population "evaporated", The Master Chief Collection's woes, and Microsoft's need for a strong title to sell more Xbox One units. "343's response to that quagmire," Gies wrote, "[is] to return to the fundamentals of what made the series great in the first place. The studio has brought Halo's mechanics kicking and screaming into the modern era, while providing the most bombastic, co-op-driven campaign in Halo history." GameSpot's Mike Mahardy agreed that 343 had produced some of the best iterations of the game series' facets with Halo 5. IGN's Brian Albert opined that 343 Industries had created an even bigger game than previous entries, with "the strongest combat Halo has ever seen". Destructoid's Chris Carter felt that Halo 5 failed to grab him in the same way as previous games had, "but those of you who are still content with Master Chief and his wacky adventures across the galaxy will likely walk away satisfied." More critically, the reviewers of GamesTM felt that Halo 5 was "sheepish and safe" and represented a series low.

Halo 5's overall gameplay and multiplayer were well received. GameSpot praised Halo 5's multiplayer experience for being in the "best shape Halo's multiplayer has ever taken", and in particular, noting the game's return to "universal" weapon loadouts and obtaining stronger weapons spawning on-map, rather than unlocking weapons as in Halo 4. The Warzone mode was considered to be one of the "best new ideas" in both the Halo franchise and the genre, praising its MOBA-like mechanics and vast environments, explaining that "as with the rest of Halo 5, there is momentum here—but this is a force that shifts from side to side with each match. Warzone isn't so much about consistency—it's about adaptability. And the team that can roll with the punches, and punch back at the right moments, will have the upper hand." Albert praised the campaign for challenging enemies and environments dense with secret pathways and hidden weapons. "This kind of design makes Halo 5's campaign ripe for replaying, and well suited for the [...] co-op it's clearly made for", he wrote.

The game's AI received mixed impressions. Chris Carter found the squad controls rudimentary, but found the team chatter and their assistance welcome. GamesTM pointed out flaws in enemies by criticizing overpowered bosses and saying that "the number of things that can kill you instantly—even on Normal difficulty—is exasperatingly high". Reviewers like Carter and GamesTM complained of ally teammates failing to revive players, even in instances such as when they were standing right next to the player.

Halo 5's campaign and story received mixed reviews. Timothy J. Seppala of Engadget felt it was the first time in years that the campaign felt like a step backward compared to its predecessor; "instead of addressing what it got wrong with [Halo 4] and doubling down on what it did right, the team fundamentally altered how a Halo campaign works to horrendous results." Time's Matt Peckham felt that in comparison to the setup in Halo 5's marketing and the Hunt the Truth series, which suggested a novel direction for the series, "What happens in Halo 5's story, by contrast, feels disappointingly by the numbers." GameSpot's Mike Mahardy felt that while the plot had promise, the campaign did not effectively capitalize on its opportunities: "Cutscenes fade to black before they feel finished. Character motivations shift on a whim." Forbes' Paul Thier and GamesRadar's David Houghton complained that players did not suitably impact the story's progression, and that the game's cliffhanger ended the plot at the conclusion of the first act. Though he also found fault with parts of Halo 5's campaign, Albert praised Cortana's threat as "less black and white" in motives than previous antagonists, and the background chatter contributing to learning more about each character.

The game's mainstream marketing received criticism for being different from the game's plot. Phil Hornshaw of Digital Trends wrote that Halo 5's marketing "suggests an emotional conflict between the questionably-loyal Chief and the 'traitor-hunting' Osiris leader, Locke, but those moments are barely in the game". 343 later promised that they had heard complaints about the lack of Master Chief in Halo 5, and would renew their focus on the character in the future.

In a 2022 retrospective ranking the Halo series, Game Informer called Halo 5 the most controversial game in the franchise. The game was followed by a sequel, Halo Infinite in 2021.

=== Awards ===
List of awards and nominations
Award	Category	Result	Ref.
The Game Awards 2015	Best Multiplayer	Nominated	
The Game Awards 2015	Best Shooter	Nominated	
The Game Awards 2015	Best Score/Soundtrack	Nominated	
Game Critics Awards 2015	Best Action Game	Nominated	
Game Critics Awards 2015	Best Online Multiplayer	Nominated	
Game Revolution Best of 2015 Awards	Best Multiplayer	Won	
Game Revolution Best of 2015 Awards	Best Shooter	Won	
Game Revolution Best of 2015 Awards	Best Xbox Exclusive	Nominated	
Game Revolution Best of 2015 Awards	Game of the Year	Nominated	
IGN Best of 2015 Awards	Best Competitive Multiplayer	Honorable mention (tie)	
IGN Best of 2015 Awards	Best Shooter	Nominated	
OXM Game of the Year Awards 2015	Best Innovation	Won	
OXM Game of the Year Awards 2015	Best Online Multiplayer	Won	
OXM Game of the Year Awards 2015	Ultimate Game of the Year	Nominated	
19th Annual D.I.C.E. Awards	Outstanding Achievement in Online Gameplay	Nominated	
20th Satellite Awards	Outstanding Action/Adventure Game	Nominated	
12th BAFTA Games Awards	Best Music	Nominated	
Canadian Videogame Awards 2015	Fans' Choice: Best International Game	Nominated	
