= List of Gretchen Corbett performances =

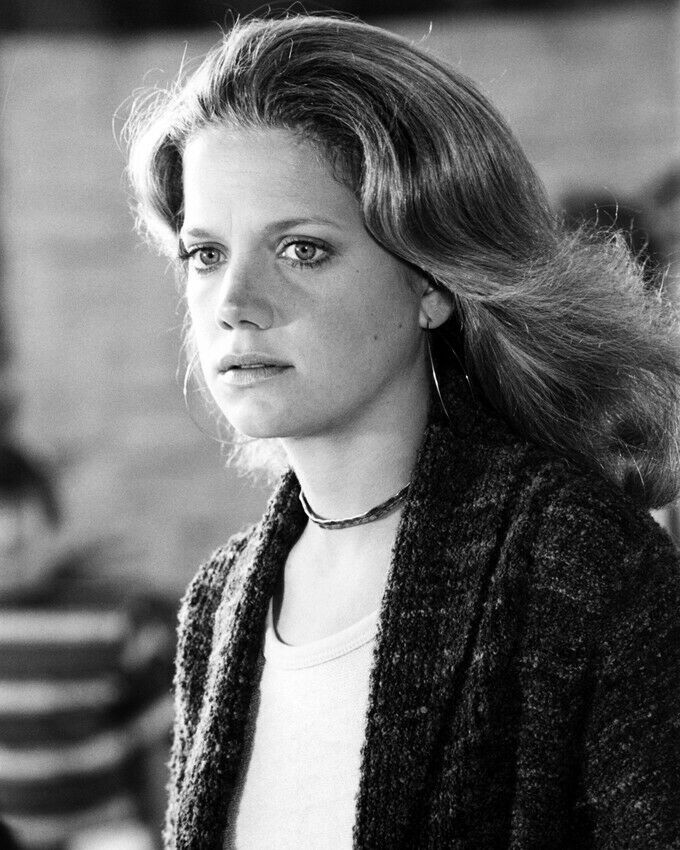
Corbett in 1975

Gretchen Corbett is an American actress of film, stage, and television. She began her career as a stage actress, starring in productions at the Oregon Shakespeare Festival before being cast in Broadway productions of After the Rain (1967) and Forty Carats (1968). She made her feature film debut in the comedy Out of It (1969), and subsequently had supporting roles in the horror films Let's Scare Jessica to Death (1971) and The Savage Bees (1976), as well as the drama The Other Side of the Mountain Part 2 (1978). She also appeared on stage in New York-based productions of Henry IV (1970), The Survival of St. Joan (1970–1971), and The Justice Box (1971).

Between 1974 and 1978, Corbett portrayed attorney Beth Davenport on the primetime series The Rockford Files, opposite James Garner. She subsequently starred as a doctor in the supernatural horror film Jaws of Satan (1981), followed by a role in the television drama film Million Dollar Infield (1982). Corbett worked consistently in guest-starring roles on television throughout the 1980s, as well as appearing in regional theater productions. Since the 2000s, she has appeared in numerous stage productions with Portland Center Stage, in her hometown of Portland, Oregon, as well as directing plays. Between 2013 and 2015, she had a recurring guest role on the comedy series Portlandia, and appeared in the Hulu series Shrill in 2019.

== Film ==
Year	Title	Role	Notes	Ref.
1969	Out of It	Barbara		
1971	Let's Scare Jessica to Death	The Girl		
1973	The House and the Brain	Kate Marsh	Television film	
1974	The Cay	Grace Enright	Television film	
1976	Farewell to Manzanar	Lois	Television film	
1976	The Savage Bees	Jeannie Deveraux	Television film	
1978	The Other Side of the Mountain: Part II	Linda Mae Meyers		
1978	Secrets of Three Hungry Wives	Karen McClure	Television film	
1979	Mandrake	Jennifer Lindsay	Television film	
1979	She's Dressed to Kill	Jennifer Gooch	Television film	
1980	High Ice	Liz	Television film	
1980	PSI Factor	Lt. Sheila Foster		
1981	Jaws of Satan	Dr. Maggie Sheridan		
1981	Time Warp	Ellen Devore	Television film	
1982	Million Dollar Infield	Carole Frische	Television film	
1984	Things Are Looking Up	Joanne Braithwaite	Television film	
1985	North Beach and Rawhide	Rita Aaron	Television film	
1991	Final Verdict	Aunt Blanche	Television film	
1993	Moment of Truth: Why My Daughter?	Mrs. Hill	Television film	
1995	Without Evidence	Mary		
1996	If the Frame Fits...	Beth (Davenport) Van Zandt	Television film	
1996	The Rockford Files: Friends and Foul Play	Beth (Davenport) Van Zandt	Television film	
1998	A Change of Heart	Gail Stern	Also known as: "A Father for Brittany"	
1999	The Rockford Files: If It Bleeds... It Leads	Beth Davenport	Television film	
2011	Motor Away	Paisley	Short film	
2011	Bucksville	Kathleen French		
2012	Evelyn	Evelyn	Short film	
2021	Pig	Mac		
2021	Lorelei	Kitty		
2026	The Cycle	Joni		

== Television ==
=== Series ===
Year	Title	Role	Notes	Ref.
1967	Love Is a Many Splendored Thing	Meg Stewart	1 episode	
1968	N.Y.P.D.	Darlene Welby	Episode: "Case of the Shady Lady"	
1973	Kojak	Jeri	Episode: "Conspiracy of Fear"	
1974	Ironside	Gail Portman	Episode: "The Taste of Ashes"	
1974	Banacek	Vicki Merrick	Episode: "Now You See Me, Now You Don't"	
1974	Columbo	Jessica Conroy	Episode: "An Exercise in Fatality"	
1974	Gunsmoke	Arlene	Episode: "Town in Chains"	
1974	Sierra	Theodora Burke	Episode: "The Trek"	
1974–1976	Marcus Welby, M.D.	Hedy Moran/Leah Blakely/Jan Allister	4 episodes	
1975	Hawaii Five-0	Glynis	Episode: "Study in Rage"	
1975	McMillan & Wife	Megan McMillan	Episode: "Love, Honor, and Swindle"	
1975	Ellery Queen	Jenny O'Brien	Episode: "The Adventure of Colonel Nivin's Memoirs"	
1975	Barbary Coast	Lily Colt	Episode: "Arson and Old Lace"	
1975	Matt Helm	Nancy Taylor	Episode: "Murder on the Run"	
1975–1976	Emergency!	Mara Lynn Smith/Sue Hickman	2 episodes	
1976	Switch	Beryl	Episode: "Come Die with Me"	
1976	Wonder Woman	Erica Belgard	Episode: "Wonder Woman vs Gargantua"	
1976	Kingston Confidential	Helen Drew	Episode: "Welcome to Paradise"	
1974–1978	The Rockford Files	Beth Davenport	33 episodes	
1977–1978	Family	Ellen Rickover	3 episodes	
1978	Barnaby Jones	Jenny Hastings	Episode: "Blind Jeopardy"	
1978	W.E.B.		Episode: "The Great Clowns"	
1978	Lucan	Bonnie	Episode: "Thunder God Gold"	
1981	The Misadventures of Sheriff Lobo	Kathleen Dixon, Esq.	Episode: "Bang, Bang... You're Dead!"	
1981	One Day at a Time	Sophie	Episode: "Plain Favorite"	
1982	Trapper John, M.D.	Vivian Langtry	Episode: "Victims"	
1983	Cheers	Gretchen Darrow	Episode: "Diane's Perfect Date"	
1983	Tales of the Unexpected	Martha Parker	Episode: "Turn of the Tide"	
1983	The Mississippi		Episode: "Peace With Honor"	
1981–1983	Magnum, P.I.	Holly Hudson/Holly Fox/Christine Richards	2 episodes	
1985	Otherworld	June Sterling	8 episodes	
1985	Simon & Simon	Lisa Cambio	Episode: "Burden of the Beast"	
1986	Murder, She Wrote	Lt. A Caruso	Episode: "Deadline for Murder"	
1987	21 Jump Street	Jan Prentiss	Episode: "Higher Education"	
1989	A Peaceable Kingdom	Dr. Amelia Altman	Episode: "Jaguar"	
1990	Hunter	Mary Reynolds	Episode: "Brotherly Love"	
1991	The Trials of Rosie O'Neill	Madeleine	Episode: "The Reunion"	
1995	Dead by Sunset	Barbara Welch	1 episode	
1995	Medicine Ball	Mrs. Scheider	Episode: "Hot Lips and Major Burns"	
2013–2015	Portlandia	Mary Eunice Oliver	2 episodes	
2019	Shrill	Jenelle	Episode: "Date"	

=== Televised plays ===
Year	Title	Role	Notes	Ref.
1975	Knuckle	Jenny	PBS's Hollywood Television Theater	
1976	The Fatal Weakness	Penny Espenshade	PBS's Hollywood Television Theater	

== Stage ==
Year	Title	Role	Location	Notes	Ref.
1966	Othello	Desdemona	Oregon Shakespeare Festival		
1967	Romeo and Juliet	Juliet Capulet	Repertory Theatre, New Orleans		
1967	Arms and the Man	Raina Petkoff	Sheridan Square Playhouse		
1967	After the Rain	Sonya Banks	John Golden Theatre	Broadway	
1968	The Bench	Jessie	Gramercy Arts Theatre		
1968	Iphigenia in Aulis	Iphigenia	Circle in the Square Theatre	Broadway	
1968	Forty Carats	Trina Stanley	Morosco Theatre	Broadway	
1970	Henry IV, Part 1 & Part 2	Joan la Pucelle	Delacorte Theater		
1970–1971	The Survival of St. Joan	Jeanne d'Arc	Anderson Theatre, New York City		
1971	The Justice Box	Francoise	Theatre de Lys		
1972	The Effect of Gamma Rays on Man-in-the-Moon Marigolds	Ruth	Berkshire Theatre Festival		
1972	Moonchildren	Shelly / Ruth / Cathy (understudy)	Royal Theatre	Broadway	
1973	Summer and Smoke	Alma Winemiller	Drew University, Madison, New Jersey		
1973	As You Like It	Rosalind	Drew University, Madison, New Jersey		
1973	The Master Builder	Hilda Wangel	Long Wharf Theatre, New Haven, Connecticut		
1977–1978	At the End of Long Island		Mark Taper Forum		
1982	The Carome Brothers' Italian Food Products Corp.'s; Annual Pasta Pageant	Roxanne	Long Wharf Theatre, New Haven, Connecticut		
1987	The Traveler	The Girlfriend	Mark Taper Forum		
1988	The Heidi Chronicles	Fran / Lisa / April	Seattle Repertory Theatre		
1988	The Fox	Jill	Van Nuys Theatre		
1993	Dancing at Lughnasa	Maggie	Oregon Shakespeare Festival		
2009	A Skull in Connemara	Maryjohnny Rafferty	Third Rail Repertory, Portland, Oregon		
2010	The Gray Sisters	Dina	Third Rail Repertory, Portland, Oregon		
2011	One Flew Over the Cuckoo's Nest	Nurse Ratched	Portland Center Stage		
2012	Anna Karenina	Mother Shcherbatskaya	Portland Center Stage		
2014	Bo-Nita	—N/a	Portland Center Stage	Director	
2016	Not Medea	—N/a	B Street Theatre, Sacramento, California	Director	
2019	The Breath of Life	Madeleine Palmer	Portland Center Stage		

== Sources ==
- Roberts, Jerry (2003). The Great American Playwrights on the Screen: A Critical Guide to Film, Video, and DVD. New York City, New York: Applause Books. ISBN 978-1-557-83512-3.
- Terrace, Vincent (1985). Encyclopedia of Television Series, Pilots and Specials. Vol. 2. New York City, New York: New York Zoetrope. ISBN 978-0-918-43261-2.
