= Henry W. Corbett =

American businessman, politician, and philanthropist (1827–1903)

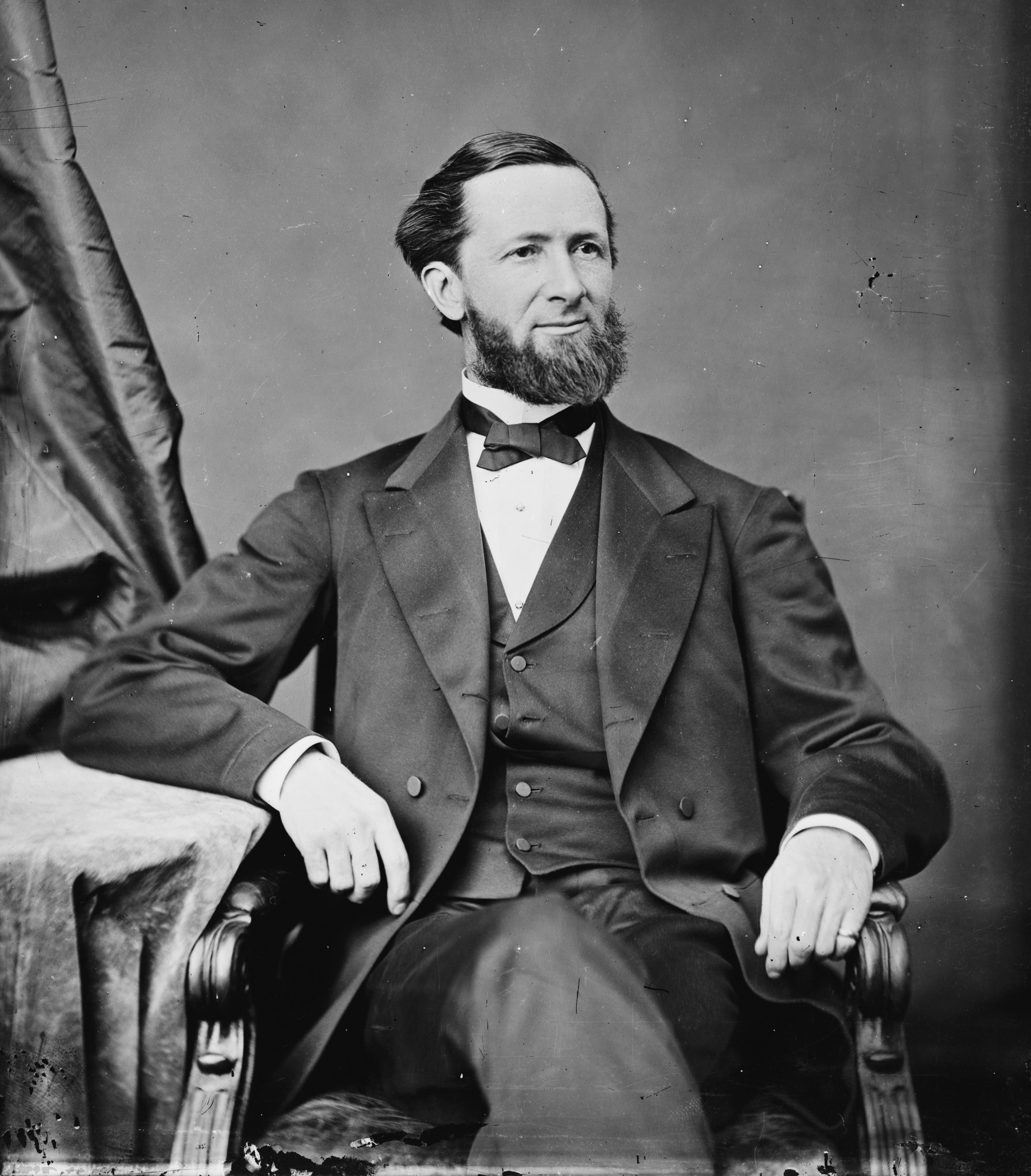

United States Senator from Oregon
- In office March 4, 1867 – March 3, 1873
- Preceded by: James W. Nesmith
- Succeeded by: John H. Mitchell

Personal details
- Born: February 18, 1827 Westborough, Massachusetts, U.S.
- Died: March 31, 1903 (aged 76) Portland, Oregon, U.S.
- Resting place: River View Cemetery
- Party: Republican
- Spouse(s): Caroline Jagger (died 1865) Emma Ruggles

Henry Winslow Corbett (February 18, 1827 – March 31, 1903) was an American businessman, politician, civic benefactor, and philanthropist in the state of Oregon. A native of Massachusetts, he spent his early life in the East and New York before moving to the Oregon Territory. He was a prominent figure in the early development of Portland, Oregon, and was involved in numerous business ventures there, starting in general merchandise. His interests later included banking, finance, insurance, river shipping, stage lines, railways, telegraph, iron and steel and the erection of Portland downtown buildings among other enterprises. A Republican, he served as a United States senator from 1867 to 1873.

== Early years ==
Corbett was born in Westborough, Massachusetts, on February 18, 1827. Of English descent, born into a family that had settled in Massachusetts in the seventeenth century, his parents were Elijah and Melinda Corbett. He was the youngest son, the fifth child, of a family of eight.

His father became the first edge tool manufacturer in Westborough, Massachusetts, and later moved his business to Washington County, New York. When he retired, he moved his family to Cambridge, New York, where he had a hotel and farm. He died in 1845.

There were three sons Joel Hamilton Corbett, the eldest and ten years Henry's senior, Elijah Corbett III, who was slightly over two years older than Henry. Elijah was to follow his younger brother, Henry, to Portland in 1854 followed by his two surviving younger sisters Mary Freeland Corbett (Mrs. Thomas Robertson who with her husband was to move to Portland in 1856) and Emily Phelps Corbett (later to marry Henry Failing in Portland in 1858). H.W. Corbett and these three siblings lived in Portland until their deaths.

In 1831, Corbett moved with his parents to the town of White Creek, New York, in 1831. Corbett attended the local common schools and then engaged in mercantile pursuits in Cambridge, New York, in 1840. There he attended Cambridge Academy before he moved to New York City in 1843 where he worked at Williams Bradford & Co, dry goods merchants, for seven years.

== Oregon territory ==
Oregon Territory had become an undisputed US possession in June 1846. A treaty had been concluded with the British on June 15, 1846, and ratified by the Senate on June 18, 1846. So the land South of British Columbia to the California border and West of the Rocky Mountain Divide was no longer US/British joint occupancy but undisputed United States territory. Congress passed the Bill creating Oregon Territory on August 13, 1848.

=== Business partnership ===
Corbett, foreseeing this new US territory's promise, then subject to US law, formed a three-year 50/50 partnership, signed October 12, 1850, with Williams Bradford & Co "for the purpose of selling goods, wares and merchandise and farming implements at Portland, Oregon Territory." Williams Bradford were to provide the goods, cash and credit. Corbett, aged twenty-three, was to go to Portland to run the business.

He chartered a bark, the Frances and Louise, and loaded it with $25,000 worth of general merchandise, mainly assorted hardware; powder, shot, nails, brooms, implements and groceries; coffee, sugar, tobacco, drugs, medicine, millinery, silk goods and shoes. She set sail from New York on the long voyage through the Straits of Magellan around Cape Horn up the Pacific Coast to Portland.

Corbett then embarked on the steamship Empire City from New York and crossed the Isthmus of Panama on the "hurricane deck of a mule" (there was no Panama Canal until 1914 over ten years after his death). At Panama City he boarded the S.S. Columbia, one of the ships of the Pacific Steamship Company. She was then on her maiden voyage en route to San Francisco. The Columbia was the first steamship built to ply the route between San Francisco and Astoria, at the mouth of the Columbia River. He then embarked on the Little Columbia, sleeping on the open deck, for the overnight passage up the Columbia and the Willamette rivers to Portland, incorporated as a city a month before on February 8, 1851.

Corbett arrived on March 5, 1851, in Portland, a city of little over 821 souls on the Willamette River, with a few small stores and businesses, large tree stumps bordering its two streets, Front and First, and backed by virgin forest.

Arriving in Portland, he climbed the riverbank to the Warren House, the principal hotel, situated on the corner of Oak and Front streets, which would "accommodate, by judicious crowding, about a dozen people".

Before the arrival of the Frances and Louise with his merchandise, Corbett spent two months familiarizing himself with Oregon Territory and its main settlements. He visited Astoria, Oregon City, Salem, Santiam, Albany, Corvallis and Lafayette.

Corbett felt that tiny Portland with its strategic location would make a logical hub for commerce for the Territory and for shipping supplies of farm produce and timber to California.

He rented a building there that was being erected on the corner of Front and Oak streets, for $125 per month. His shipment arrived in May. He hoisted his goods into the upper story and "slept with his wares". As a Presbyterian, he was one of the first businessmen in Portland to invariably close on Sundays.

Corbett's business at that time dealt in general merchandise, hardware and farming implements - supplying the ranchers and farmers and the new settlers who were beginning to arrive by the Oregon Trail. Oregon Territory then included the large area now occupied by the states of Oregon, Washington, Idaho and part of Montana and Wyoming. Corbett was the first general merchant in Portland and probably in Oregon Territory.

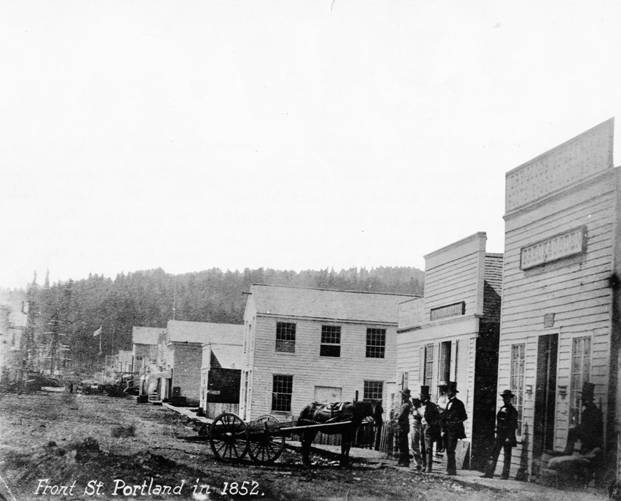
Front St. in Portland in 1852. H.W. Corbett, third from right in stove pipe hat, in year after he arrived. (Oregon Historical Society)

Corbett sold most of his initial stock of goods in fourteen months at a profit of $20,000. The cost of the entire original cargo had been $24,621.57. His total sales by then had been $83,000 with additional supplies of stock and his profit of about $20,000 was divided equally between his backers Williams, Bradford and Co. and himself. On the advice of his supplier who noted the downturn in the California Gold Rush, Corbett left for New York in July 1852, leaving his store with employees Finley McLaren and Robert McLaren. He first took them on as co-partners to continue the business while he was in New York.

Arriving in New York, he split this substantial profit with his partners Williams Bradford & Co, who tried to persuade him to stay in the East to be involved in their New York business. Instead he bought out their share in the partnership on August 28, 1852, for $1750.

Corbett had renamed the store Corbett & McLarens, and became an independent buyer. He began purchasing for his store and other merchants who wanted to buy directly from New York, rather than buying overpriced goods from San Francisco. He also offered credit to his customers, which increased his sales against competitors.

He continued to use Williams Bradford as one of his principle suppliers in the East. However he was now able to use his own resources and negotiate goods on advantageous terms of credit and he arranged for more shipments around the Horn.

He also became engaged at that time to Caroline E. Jagger of Albany, New York. She was to follow Corbett to Portland to be married there once she had seen where she was to be living. Corbett and she were married in Portland, Oregon, in February 1853.

=== H. W. Corbett & Co. ===
Soon after his return to Portland, Corbett, dissolved the partnership with the McLaren brothers, on June 17, 1854, and his business became a sole proprietorship as H.W. Corbett & Co. He also bought the freehold of the store. As an individualist, Corbett from then on controlled his business as single proprietorship from 1854 to 1871, rather than as a partnership, which was the norm for other Portland merchants at the time. It enabled Corbett to pour his profits back into his business each year.

He continued shipping goods to Portland around Cape Horn, and after the railway was built in 1855 across the Isthmus of Panama, he also transhipped some goods by rail.

The Atlantic shipping terminal was in Colon, Panama. The Pacific terminal was in Panama City. The 48-mile double track railway was the first transcontinental railway and an engineering marvel of the era. Until the opening of the Panama Canal in 1914, the Panama Railway Company carried the heaviest volume of freight per unit length of any railroad in the world. H. W. Corbett and others from Portland would then use it to get back and forth to the connecting ships to and from the East, rather than crossing on mule back. When the transcontinental Union Pacific Railroad to San Francisco was completed on May 10, 1869, this more direct route was then used for shipping and travel connecting to Portland by boat or stage coach.

In 1869 Corbett was able to make his first transcontinental trip from the East to San Francisco. Prior to that he had crossed the Isthmus of Panama thirteen times on trips between the East and West. Corbett was later instrumental in getting the transcontinental railway connection built direct to Portland in 1883 (see Railways and river transportation below).

Corbett made lifelong friendships with his fellow merchants who had travelled out from the East in the months following his arrival in Portland on March 5, 1851: William S. Ladd (arrived April 8, 1851), Josiah Failing (also referred to as Jushua), and his son Henry Failing and C. H. Lewis (on same boat, June 9, 1851) "All of these merchants were neighbourly, each commanding the others' fullest respect while practicing the rules of competitive business… With their Eastern backgrounds they helped impress upon the young community the distinct New England cultural tone which pervaded the town from its inception."

== Oregon becomes a state ==
On February 14, 1859, eight years after Corbett's arrival there, Oregon became a state.

In 1860 Corbett changed his business to a wholesale hardware and farm implement business. He became a leading dealer in various eight horse threshers and reapers and was one of the leading outlets for the McCormick reaper.

He instructed his agent in New York at Samuel Roosevelt and Co., Samuel House, that his orders marked "Steamer" he was to "send by Isthmus [of Panama], the balance for first good clipper [around Horn]". These fast sailing ships were more numerous to San Francisco: some clippers went there first and then transhipped to Portland.

Soon his business was growing so fast that Samuel House became his sole agent in New York. In 1867 he had taken two of his employees into partnership. Edward Failing, who in 1857 when he was sixteen had first started to work at H.W. Corbett and Co when he had finished school, and M.B. Millard. Each became a sixth interest partner in H.W. Corbett and Co. Edward had been only ten when he first came out to Portland with his father Josiah Failing and older brother Henry Failing, who was then seventeen and later became Corbett's brother-in-law. By September 1867 H.W. Corbett & Co. had its own office in New York City and was no longer employing an agent.

In 1869 John West and associates established the first salmon-canning factory on the Oregon side of the Columbia River and H.W.Corbett & Co. shipped the canned salmon to New York.

=== Corbett, Failing and Co. ===
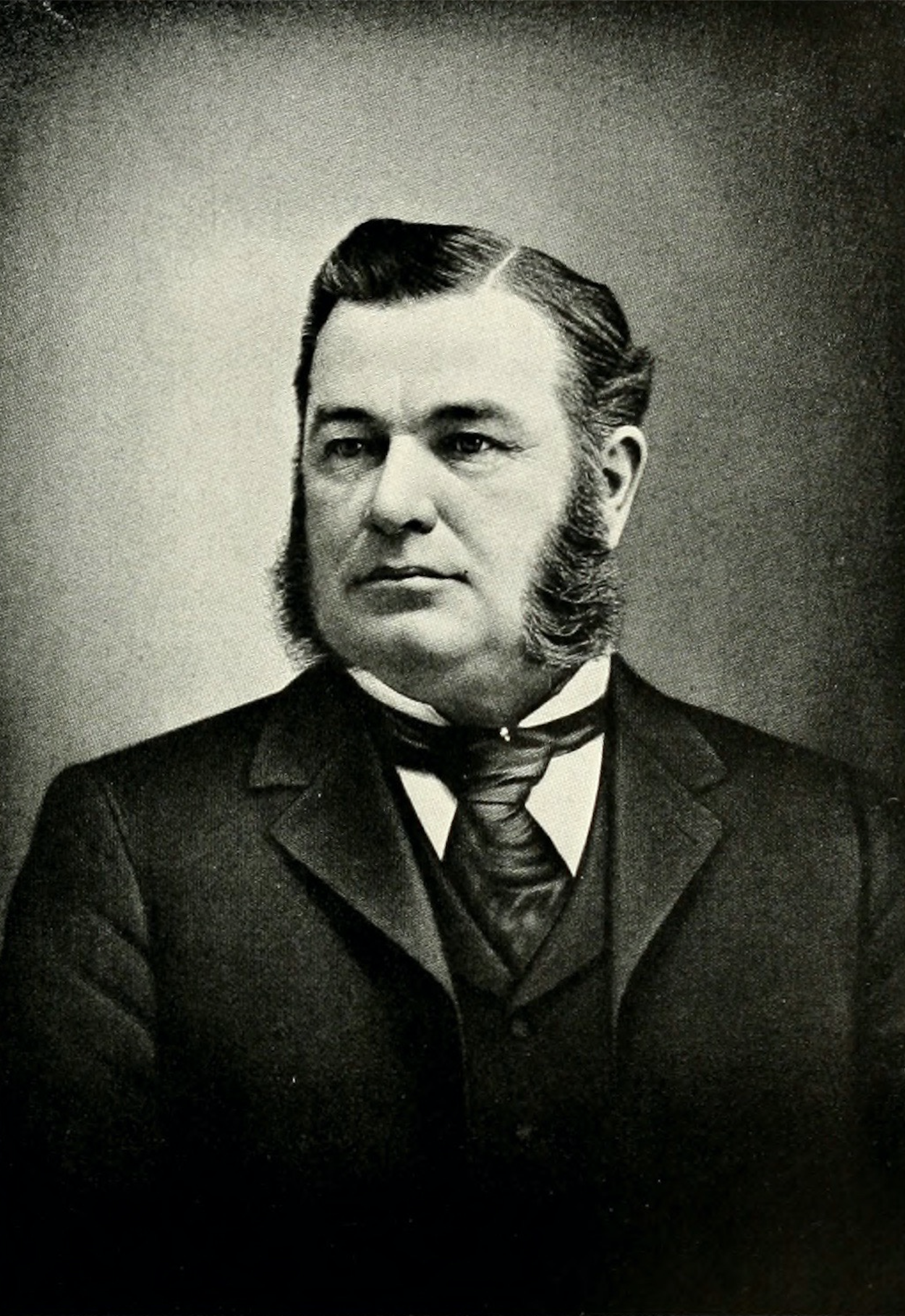
Henry Failing (1834 – 1898) Corbett's brother-in-law and a leading Portland businessman. Corbett partnered with him in many business and charitable endeavours

With the acquisition of the First National Bank in 1869 with his brother-in-law Henry Failing (who became President of the bank. Corbett was vice-president) and with Corbett serving as the US Senator in Washington from 1867 to 1873, the combination of their other duties, business acumen and constant drive in recognising new opportunities, meant that their interests went beyond the wholesale merchandise and farm machinery market. In February 1871, Corbett's (previously H.W. Corbett & Co.) and Failing's (originally J. Failing and Co. and then Failing and Hatt) dry goods and hardware businesses were amalgamated into a new major partnership, Corbett, Failing and Co., which became the largest wholesale hardware business in the Pacific Northwest.

The new partnership agreement stipulated the less demanding role of the two main partners in article six: "Henry Corbett and Henry Failing are not required to give their formal attention to the business of said firm, except as they shall find it convenient so to do – but they and each of them, are not withstanding, entitled to direct and counsel in any and all of the affairs of the firm in the same manner, and like effect as the other partners or either of them."

In addition to Corbett and Failing, the partners from Oregon were Marshall Millard and Henry's younger brother Edward Failing who came into the partnership from H.W. Corbett & Co. where they were one-sixth partners. James F. Failing came into the new company from Henry Failing's business. (James had initially stayed back in New York with his mother and two sisters in a house on Washington Square when Josiah Failing and his two eldest sons, seventeen-year-old Henry and ten-year-old Edward, had come to Portland on June 9, 1851, just three months after Corbett. Also included as a partner was Failing's former New York agent John A. Hatt. Hatt later left the partnership when the arrival of telegraph and train connections with the East made a New York office no longer necessary. Corbett, Failing and Co were using the Northern Pacific Railroad (Northern Pacific Railroad Fast Freight Line) from New York by April 3, 1884 (see Corbett's involvement in railways below).

Corbett and Henry Failing remained investors, and the new partnership divisions were "Henry W. Corbett and Henry Failing four twentieths each. And John Hatt, Marshall Millard, Edward Failing and James Failing three twentieths each."

In 1891 Corbett retired from the business, bestowing his share on his eldest son Henry Jagger Corbett. His longtime right hand and partner, who was by then managing the business, wrote:

Dear Sir, … In your letter, you make an allusion to the long time (40 years) you have been engaged in this business and it brings strongly to my mind that these forty years I have been nearly thirty four years with you. This period of over a third of a century covers my entire business life. I need not tell you how much I regret your withdrawal from the firm,... I owe much to your kindness, careful training and good example, and at this moment it is some comfort to me to reflect that I have been faithful to your interests and useful to you for many years. That it may please God to restore you to health and grant you many happy years of life is my hope and prayer.
Yours very truly,
Edward Failing

Corbett apparently thought so highly of Edward Failing, his former junior partner in his wholesale hardware, merchandise and farm machinery business, that he was later named as one of Corbett's executors in his will and was bequeathed by him in his will a financial bequest as well as shares in the First National Bank, but in the event Edward had died before him.

== Other businesses ==
Corbett was involved in numerous other businesses.

=== Oregon Telegraph Company ===
Corbett formed (with W.S. Ladd and S.G. Reed) the Oregon Telegraph Company in 1862, connecting Portland to the East by telegraph communications. This meant that Portland could get news and place orders with the eastern US without delays. On March 8, 1964, the mayors of Portland, Maine, and Portland, Oregon, used it to exchange greetings.

=== Oregon Stage Line ===
Posters H.W.Corbett & Co., Proprietor's Oregon Stage Line (Dale Forster)

Corbett became proprietor in 1865 of the Oregon Stage Line. This four and six horse stage coach line ran overland daily between Portland, Oregon, and Sacramento, California, and points in between. It appears Corbett used both four and six horse coaches depending on the weight of documents carried, the terrain and weather conditions. The route ran between Portland and Sacramento going south (and the reverse going north) stopping at Oregon City, Salem, Albany, Corvallis, Eugene, Oakland, Winchester, Roseburg, Canyonville and Jacksonville in Oregon and Yreka, Trinity Centre, Shasta, Red Bluff, Tehama, Chico, Oroville, Marysville and Sacramento in California. Through ticket holders could stop over at any of these stops going either way.

The stage company provided seven-day daily runs from April–December and twelve-day runs during other months. Later Corbett cut the seven-day run to a six-day run. The steamships to and from San Francisco took five days but only went fortnightly so the stage usually provided a faster means of transport for both mail and passengers.

There were connecting stage lines running from Sacramento to where the rail track under construction had reached linking east on to Missouri. These connecting stages were first contracted by Ben Holladay in 1862, who later sold his stage line to Wells Fargo in 1866. As the Central Pacific Railroad and Union Pacific Railroad tracks were approaching each other this overland stage-line got shorter.

Corbett held the contract to carry the mails to Lincoln, California and San Francisco, only giving up that 640-mile route when it conflicted with his responsibilities as a U.S. senator.

=== Railways and river transportation ===
Corbett was involved in the completion of the transcontinental railway to Portland in 1883. He was one of the original incorporators of the Northern Pacific Railroad in 1864 (and he was a director of Columbia River and Northern Railway Company ) and had been an early promoter, a principal investor and director of the Oregon Railway and Navigation Company (OR&N). Corbett and Failing were elected as directors of Oregon Railway and Navigation Company (OR&N) in June 1888, along with Henry Villard, Christopher Meyer, John Hubert Hall, Sidney Dillon, Charles S. Colby, Colgate Hoyt, C. H. Lewis, W. S. Ladd, Cyrus A. Dolph, W. H. Holcomb, and S. B. Wiley. Contemporaneous elections for the Oregon and Transcontinental and the Northern Pacific Terminal Company installed many of the same men on the boards of those companies as well. The Northern Pacific Terminal Company was to build Portland Union Station. The elections were understood to signal no change at ORNC, underscoring their intent to extend the Farmington Line to the Coeur D'Alene Mines, and were viewed as a defeat of Villard and his initiative to jointly lease property of the Northern Pacific and the Union Pacific. Corbett took a lead in the reorganisation and completion of the line after it had run into financial trouble in 1873. The completion of the OR&N line ultimately linked Portland along the Columbia River Gorge through to St. Paul, Minnesota with connections east to the Union Pacific Railroad. The Northern Pacific using this OR&N line was the first transcontinental train to arrive in Portland on September 11, 1883, and was greeted with great celebrations. Thereafter the OR&N and the Northern Pacific jointly operated the eastbound Atlantic Express and the Westbound Pacific Express . The OR&N later became part of Union Pacific after it bought a controlling interest in 1898. (From 1936 the railroad operated under the Union Pacific name.)

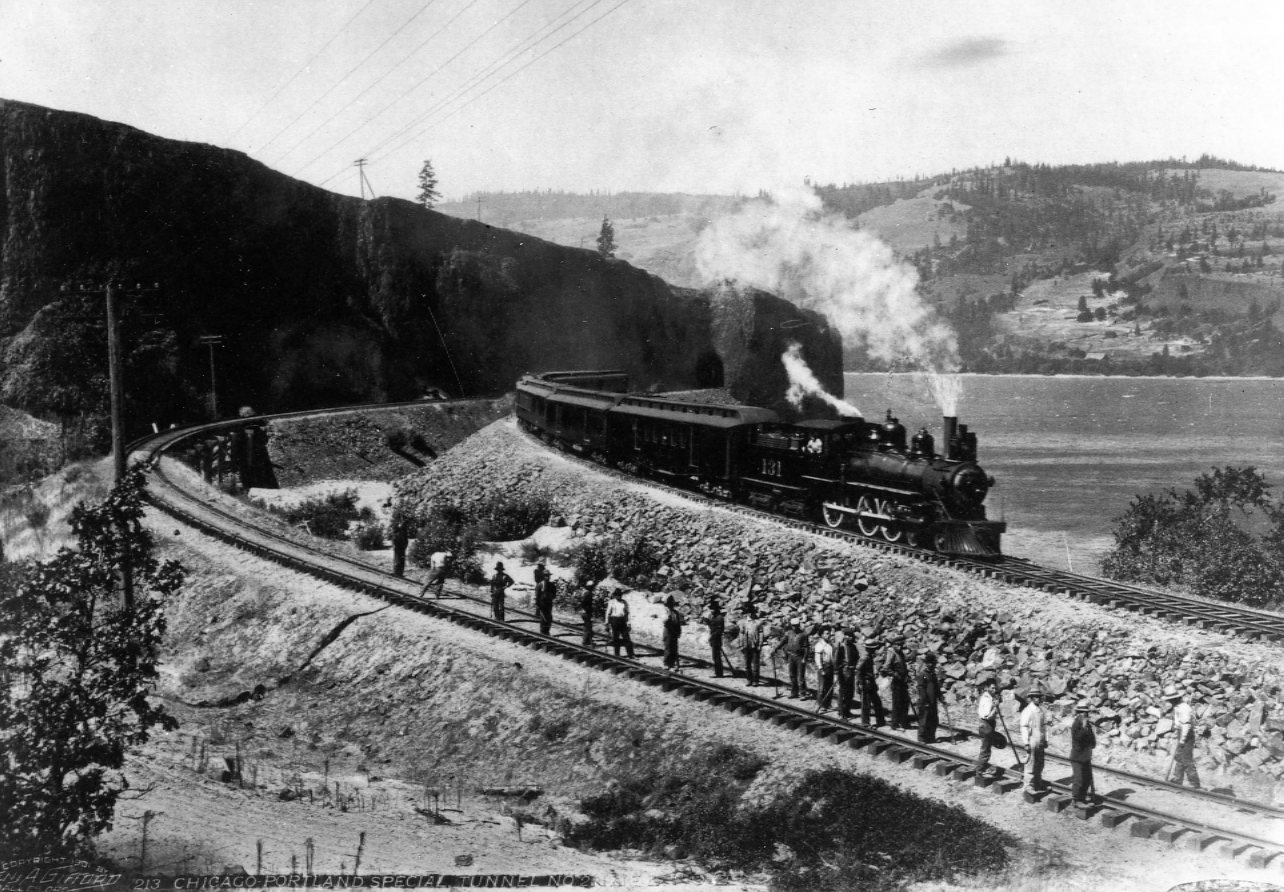
The O.R.&N.'s "Chicago Special" (Benjamin Gifford 1901) (Oregon Historical Society)

Prior to the building of the transcontinental railway, Portland's contact with the outside world – California or the eastern US – was largely by sea. These journeys took a long time: they were made for business; to replenish stocks; visits to family; education in the East; or to see the world. Even the inland routes were largely along rivers.

In May 1869, it became possible to travel by steamboat from Portland up the Columbia River to Umatilla, Oregon, then by stagecoach via Boise, Idaho Territory to the Union Pacific railhead at Kelton, Utah, then a Territory and from there on to localities in the east. This route could save time, but was difficult and hard going as described when teenage W.M.Ladd went with his father's partner C.E.Tilton to the East and Europe.

Corbett was also involved in building the street railways as an investor and director in the City & Suburban Railway.

At his death he held substantial holdings in the City & Suburban Railway Company and the Union Pacific Railway.

=== The First National Bank ===
In 1869, ten years after the formation of the Ladd and Tilton Bank, Corbett and his brother-in-law Henry Failing (with his father Josiah Failing) purchased almost all the shares of the First National Bank. Corbett held 500 shares, Henry Failing 250 and his father Josiah 50 and they immediately increased the bank's capitalization from $100,000 to $250,000.

Henry Failing became President of the bank, Corbett the vice-president. Failing held the position until his unexpected death in 1898 when Corbett assumed the President's role until his own death in 1903.

The First National was the only bank in Portland and for a long time the only one West of the Rocky Mountains that was chartered under the National Banking Act.

This 1863 act required nationally chartered banks to hold one third of the capital of the bank in US Treasury bonds. It allowed them in return to issue a uniform bank note backed by the bonds. The amount of the notes not to exceed 90 percent of the value of the bonds. It was intended to make banking safer and guarantee the value of bank notes to in effect create a nationwide currency. In 1865 the U.S. Congress enacted a 10 percent tax on any bank or individual using state bank notes. As a result, a number of banks converted to national charters, but many simply stopped issuing notes. Instead, they began to issue demand deposit money—checking accounts. There was no state-banking act in Oregon until 1907 so other banks at the time (like the Ladd and Tilton) were strictly private proprietorships, without a board, taking deposits and lending money without regulation. The First National Bank in Portland was the exception.

The First National Bank moved into the first Corbett Building on completion 1870 (Oregon Historical Society)

Shortly after Corbett and the Failings acquired the bank it moved into the Corbett Building, completed in 1870. The Corbett Building on SW 1st Avenue between Alder and Washington was the first fully cast-iron fronted building in the city.

The three-storey building had floor to ceiling windows, an advanced innovation. Its cast-iron frontispieces were manufactured in Baltimore and shipped around Cape Horn. (The bank subsequently moved into a new bank building built by H.W. Corbett. The present First National Bank Building at 401–409 SW 5th Avenue, designed by Coolidge and Shattuck of Boston, resembling some of the Lincoln memorial classicism, was built in 1916 when the bank outgrew those later quarters and when it was subsequently under the ownership of H.W.Corbett's grandsons).

Corbett and his brother-in-law, Henry Failing proved to be astute bankers. Corbett was a keen investor and trader and the only real politician – in the broadest sense – among the merchants of 1851. Corbett was at various times City treasurer of Portland, member of the city council, and chairman of the Republican State central committee. Elected as a Republican to the United States Senate, he served from March 4, 1867, to March 3, 1873, although Josiah Failing was an Oregon delegate at the second convention that re-nominated Abraham Lincoln and the following one that chose Grant (and he also served as a Republican state chairman).

Corbett's holding in the First National Bank passed to his three grandsons at his death. Abbot Mills was appointed president and subsequently directed the First National Bank's operation for nearly 25 years. The Corbett grandsons Henry Ladd Corbett, Elliott Ruggles Corbett, and Hamilton Forbush Corbett then controlled it with over 60% of the stock while the Failing and C.S. Lewis heirs held most of the rest. After over sixty years of Corbett family majority involvement, the Corbett brothers sold the bank in 1930 (along with minority shareholders) to Transamerica Corp, which also owned Bank of America and Bancitaly, to concentrate on their real-estate and other investments. During those years the bank had been regarded as "typifying the extreme conservatism for which Portland had been celebrated for half a century".

=== The Oregonian newspaper ===
The Oregonian newspaper became an influential voice in the development of Portland and the state. It had been founded as a weekly on December 4, 1850. It became a daily in 1861.

Corbett was its proprietor from 1872 to 1877 when he bought control with others after its publisher Henry Pittock had run into financial difficulties. He subsequently sold it back to him when these were resolved.

For a while he used the paper to support his political interests in the state and nationally. When Rutherford B. Hayes was nominated as the Republican presidential standard bearer in 1876 Corbett wrote to him from Washington "…[I] have written to the "Oregonian", which I control, to give to you its most hearty and enthusiastic support".

=== Portland downtown development ===
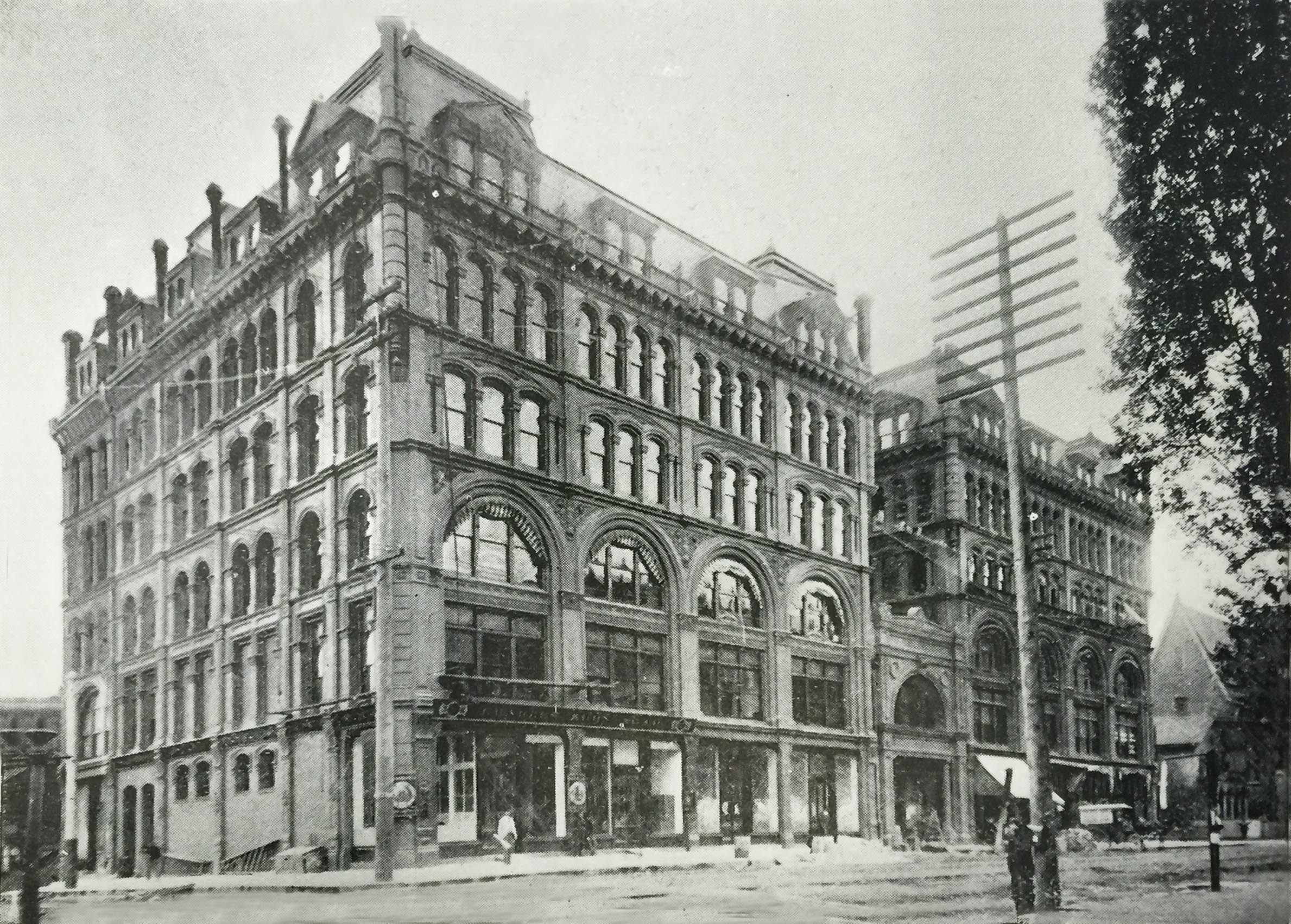
Worcester Block built by Corbett in 1889 at Third and Oak to Pine St.

Corbett was a leading early developer of downtown Portland and ultimately owned over twenty-seven buildings. Among them were:

The Corbett & Co. Building he bought in 1853 for his dry goods, hardware and farm implement business (N.E. Corner of Front and Oak).
Corbett & Co expansion in 1858 was the first building he had actually commissioned to be built.
The Corbett Building. The original Corbett Building was built in 1870 at First Avenue midway on the west side of the block between Alder and Washington (pictured above).
The Corbett (or Burrell) Block, was built in 1874 at SW Front and Alder.
The Union Block built in 1879 at First and Stark, which he built with his brother-in-law Henry Failing. (pictured below)
The First National Bank Building. This, the first building carrying the bank's name, was built in 1882 at the southeast corner of First and Washington Streets. which was later replaced as the First National Bank's main building by the present First National Bank Building built in 1916 at 5th Avenue and Stark (when his grandsons controlled the bank).
The Multnomah Building at Fifth and Morrison.
The Cambridge Block built in 1884 at Third and Morrison.
The Worcester Block in 1889 at Third and Oak to Pine Sts. (Photo above in this section)
The Marquam Block in 1889 (of which he was part owner).
The Fifth & Stark Building in 1890.
The Neustadter Building c. 1892 at Fifth and Ankeny.
The Hamilton Building in 1893. The six-story building at 529 SW 3rd Ave was named in memory Corbett's younger son Hamilton who predeceased him.

Portland Hotel built by Corbett. (Now site of Pioneer Courthouse Square) (Oregon Historical Society)

The Portland Hotel, opened in 1890, designed by McKim Mead & White (pictured on right in this section). On eight floors and with 326 bedrooms, the hotel cost over a million dollars and took eight years to build. Corbett completed the building, which had been started and abandoned by railroad magnate Henry Villard on Villard's bankruptcy. Corbett became principal owner and president. It was then one of the two most luxurious hotels in the West, second only in size to the Palace Hotel of San Francisco (it occupied the block which is now Portland's Pioneer Courthouse Square).

At his death in 1903 Corbett's estate of 27 downtown Portland buildings would increase in value by over 500% within seven years, much of the appreciation due to the financial boom and population growth stimulated by the Lewis and Clark Exposition, which he had chaired.

Corbett also owned 169 West 45th Street in New York City (just west of what is now known as Times Square), which he instructed be sold in his will to part fund his Portland charitable benefactions.

=== Finance, insurance, iron, steel and other ===
Corbett was president of the Willamette Iron Works, founded in 1865. The company cast some of the iron fronts for buildings in Portland such as the three storey iron fronted Corbett and Henry Failing built Union Block built in stages between 1879 and 1881 using the city block at 1st and Stark and covering approximately two hundred square feet. Designed by the architect W. H. Williams. It is stamped with company logo at the time Corbett was its president.

The Oregon Iron Company was established in 1865 and in 1867 and became the first company in the US to smelt iron on the US West Coast at Oswego, Oregon. The company was incorporated by William S. Ladd and John Green and Henry D. Green. The smelter operated until April 8, 1869. In early 1872 a group of Eastern and San Francisco capitalists leased the furnace with the option of buying it at the end of two years. Henry W. Corbett, Henry Failing, and W. S. Ladd served on the board of directors during this reorganisation.

Corbett founded and was president of the Security Savings & Trust Company, one of the leading financing institutions on the West coast.

He was a founder and vice-president of the Oregon Fire and Marine Insurance Company. It was founded by Corbett and William S. Ladd in 1883 and was Portland's first home-based fire insurance company. (Other firms were agents for large national and foreign insurance companies).

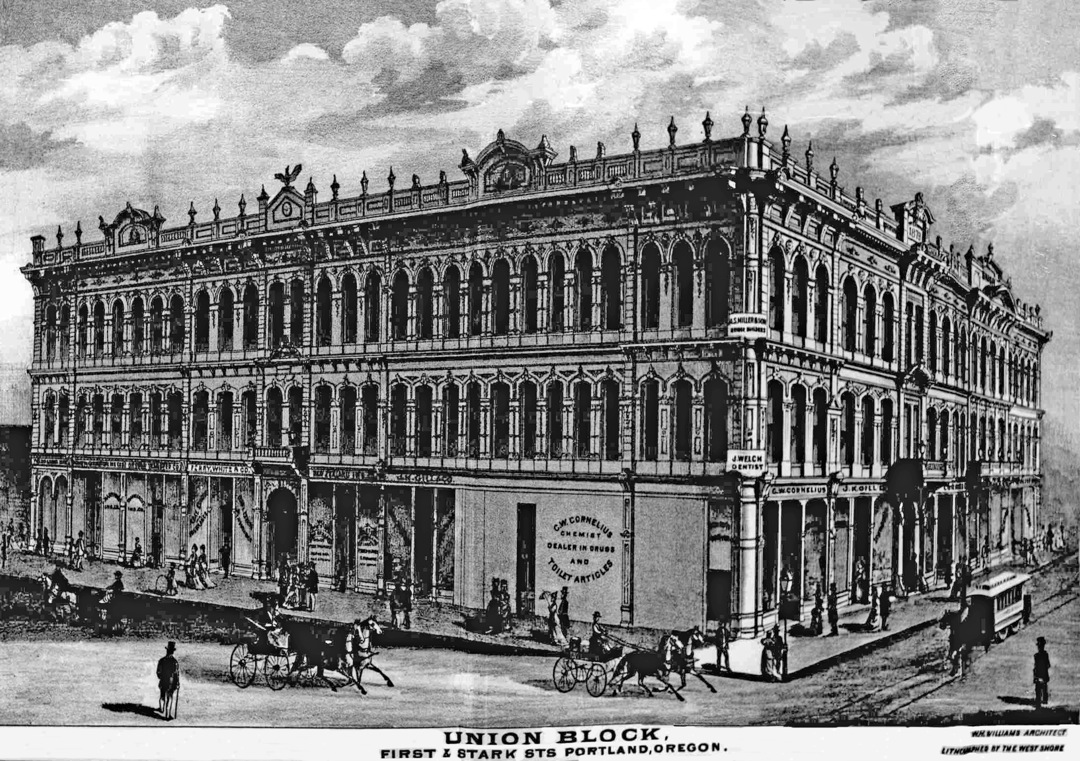
Union Block, cast iron fronted building built by Corbett & Henry Failing from 1879 to 1881 1st and Stark, Portland The West Shore, June 1, 1882 (Enhanced image courtesy of Susanna Campbell Kuo)

The businesses that he was involved in other than merchandise, banking, railways, telegraph, river transport, stage lines, buildings and newspaper covered in separate sections above also included finance, insurance, iron, steel and others such as:

- The Willamette Iron Works
- The Oregon Fire and Marine Insurance Company
- The Oregon Iron Company
- The Portland Cordage Co.
- The Portland Linseed Oil Co.
- The Portland Rope Works
- The Oregon Transfer Co.
- The Portland Gas Company
- The Trinidad Asphalt Company
- The Macadamized Road Company (built a macadamised toll road where Macadam road is now, running almost parallel with Corbett Ave.).

== Senate career ==
Corbett served as United States Senator from Oregon between 1867 and 1873 during Reconstruction after the American Civil War, becoming a Republican Senator when he was forty, eight years after Oregon had become a state.

The Democratic Party and the Whig Party had been the major political parties in the United States Second Party System. Corbett had been a Whig and follower of Henry Clay but when the Republican Party was founded on July 6, 1854, in Jackson, Michigan, he was one of its early and enthusiastic supporters. The Republican Party was founded as the anti-slavery party in opposition to the mainly pro-slavery Democratic Party as well as a replacement for the rapidly declining Whigs.

Corbett became chairman of the Republican State Central Committee and on February 14, 1859, eight years after his arrival there, Oregon became a state. It entered the union as the 33rd state but as a free state after pro-slavery forces were voted down in a lengthy struggle during the Constitutional convention.

Corbett was an early backer of Abraham Lincoln for president shortly after Oregon attained statehood. He appointed Horace Greeley, editor of the New York Tribune, as a delegate from Oregon at the 1860 Republican Convention in Chicago that nominated Lincoln.

Whether Corbett was aware that Lincoln was related to him is not recorded. This was through Corbett's great-great-great grandfather, Daniel Corbett (1693–1753), the son of the original North American settler Robert Corbett. Daniel's wife Sarah Jones had an aunt (also named Sarah Jones) who married Mordecai Lincoln. This Aunt Sarah and Mordecai Lincoln were the great-great-great grandparents of President Lincoln, so Abraham Lincoln was a fifth cousin once removed of Henry Corbett (e.g., Lincoln and Corbett's father share great-great-great-great grandparents, the parents of the elder Sarah Jones). (Corbett was also related to Salmon P. Chase from Ohio, another aspirant for the 1860 nomination, whose stray votes finally secured Lincoln the nomination).

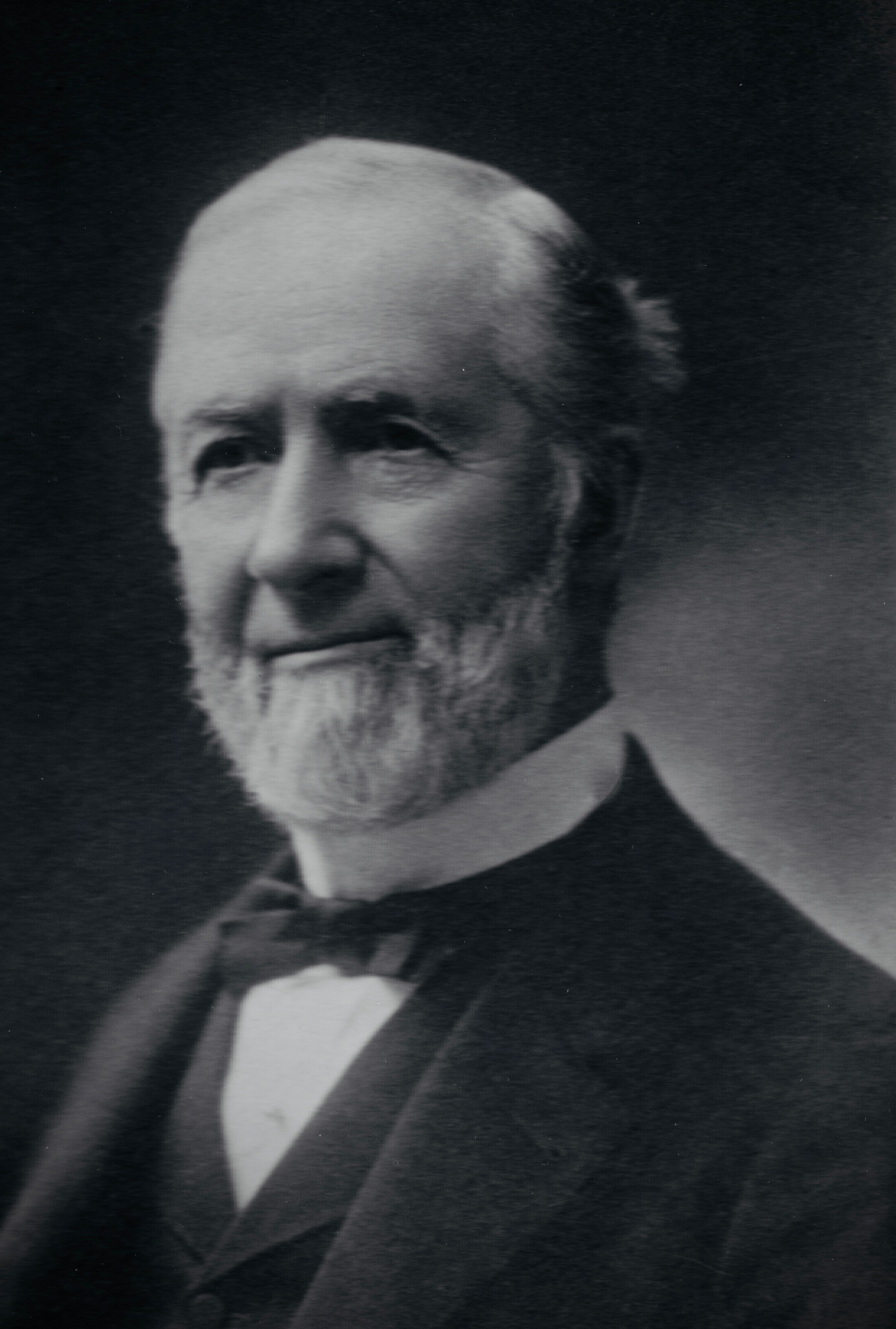
US Senator Henry W. Corbett

Corbett believed that war with the Southern States was inevitable as soon as the South decided to withdraw from the union. He believed that the future of the country lay in its union and that the war should be prosecuted against the states in open hostility with their government. On his return to Oregon he went to work to unite the Republicans and the Douglas or War Democrats. He was largely successful in this. He was asked by them to become Governor of Oregon but declined.

Corbett served as US Senator from Oregon from 1867 to 1873 during Reconstruction after the Civil War. During this economically difficult time for the Union, he was an advocate in Washington for honoring the nation's financial obligations in opposition to those who advocated debt repudiation or unilateral debt restructuring. He maintained that the government could fund its debt at a lower rate of interest, sustain its credit worthiness and save money in the long run by honoring its obligations.

In an address on the Senate floor on February 11, 1869, Senator Corbett gave notice that he was moving an amendment to the funding bill. The following two extracts from his speech give insight into his personal convictions.

It is not for the present that I speak, but it is that great, grand, and glorious future that I see for my country looming up before me, powerful and mighty as she is to be, destined to withstand, as one day she will, all the governments of the crowned heads of Europe.... We need only look back a hundred years to the march of events, when an American drew the lightning from heaven to see if it could be made subservient to man. Another American takes it up and teaches it to speak, and it is heard a thousand miles distant over distant portions of our country. Another American takes it up and stretches his electric wires through the vast ocean for thousands of miles, and he makes it talk to all Europe.... Look at …your steamships on the Atlantic; and that magnificent line of ships upon the Pacific and China seas; and yet it is only three-score years. Look at your perfect network of railroads East and West, and all this has been accomplished in a little over thirty years. Therefore let us keep … our credit untarnished and look to time, to the great future, as our remedy for this burden. To say that we cannot pay the interest on this debt is folly; there is no such sentiment in the American heart; but, on the contrary, they are determined to do and accomplish what no other nation has the internal wealth and vigor to do. Many croakers said that we could not put down this rebellion; the people said, "We will try." All the people now ask is that you should try to pay the debt. As for myself, I never had a doubt that we could put down the rebellion. Neither have I a doubt but that we can pay this debt in dollars.

… To me, Mr. President, my duty is plain; my duty to the men - that came forward to supply our suffering army, to succor our noble boys, in the days of the national darkness and despair, and to the capitalists of Germany, of Frankfort, who took our securities, and spewed out the rebel bonds, and gave to us money, the sinew of war, to assist us in maintaining the life of the nation. I need not the example of other nations to tell me what is right between man and man or between nation and nation; it needs not the shrewd argument of a lawyer to tell me what is due to my creditor - if there is any one thing that I regard more sacred in life, after my duty to my God, it is to fulfil all my engagements, both written and implied, and nothing shall drive me from this position.

In the end this reasoning carried.

As Oregon's senator he obtained the federal appropriation for building the United States Building, now known as the Pioneer Courthouse, to house Portland's US Court House and Post Office (the construction began in 1869 on the adjoining block next to his own house).

He obtained funding for the Custom House at Astoria and had Portland made a customs port of entry for the Willamette. He had the navigation on the Willamette improved, lighthouses erected along the coast and foghorns and buoys installed to mark navigable channels in the rivers. He obtained funding for a survey of public lands in Oregon and got the headquarters of the Columbia military department moved to Oregon. The bill he introduced for the return of specie payment (coinage rather than paper money) did not get through Congress but was notably later adopted.

After his retirement from the Senate he spent seven months travelling abroad.

The US Building that Senator Corbett had built. Now known as the Pioneer Courthouse. (Oregon Historical Society)

Corbett, like all U.S. Senators at the time, was appointed by election of the states' legislatures under the Constitution.

In later years he was again twice his party's nominee but was never again selected.

In 1897 the Republicans in the legislature had asked him to accept a subsequent appointment as Senator for the term beginning March 4, 1897, to succeed the sitting Republican Senator John H. Mitchell. In what was known as the "Hold-up of '97", William Simon U'Ren and his People's Party forged a coalition and used a procedural process to try to gain approval of a constitutional amendment to institute the statewide referendums process.

With the legislature having adjourned without electing anyone, the governor appointed H. W. Corbett for a second time as US Senator on March 6, 1897, to fill the Senate term that should have begun two days earlier. The Senate subsequently disagreed that the governor could appoint and needed a legislative election. In 1898 a special session was called. There was another impasse and Corbett withdrew his name. He was later again unsuccessfully proposed in 1901 when, in an almost deadlocked vote, his candidature was defeated.

Partly owing to these deadlocks, in 1906 Oregon was the first state to approve the direct referendum to choose its senators: binding on the legislature. Ultimately the nation followed the example of Oregon and by then other states also, but through direct franchise in 1914, after ratification of the 17th Amendment to the US Constitution.

== Other activities ==
=== Portland public school system ===
In 1854, apart from the educational institutions H. W. Corbett later helped found and endow, he and Josiah Failing (the immediate past mayor and Henry's father) and William S. Ladd, the then mayor, were responsible for the establishment of a tax funded Portland public school system. Together they paid for a notice in the Oregonian, then the new city's weekly newspaper. The notice called for a public meeting on December 7, 1854, to seek agreement from the taxpayers for the founding of a public school. Josiah Failing reflected their views when he stated that it made much more sense to pay taxes to build schools than to build jails. The citizens agreed.

The first public school building built as such, known as Central School was erected at cost of $7,000 (including $1000 for the land). It opened on May 17, 1858, with Mr. L.L. Terwilliger as principal. By that Summer 280 pupils had been enrolled. It was located on the block where the Portland Hotel was later built and after its demolition is now Pioneer Courthouse Square.

=== Portland Water Committee ===
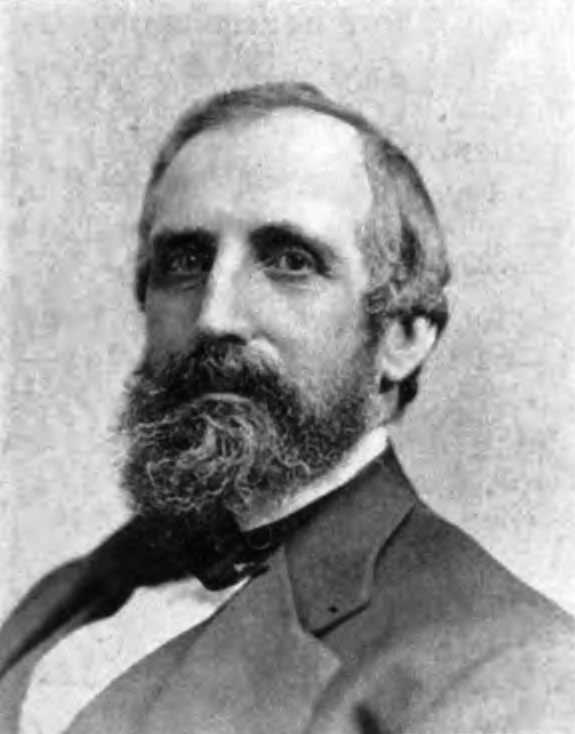
William Sargent Ladd, a business & philanthropic associate of Corbett's, whose eldest daughter Helen K. Ladd married Corbett's eldest son Henry J. Corbett.

Corbett was involved in developing Portland's Municipal water works. Henry Failing chaired the Water Committee from 1883 to 1898 and Henry Corbett succeeded him in that position from 1998 to 1903. The 15-member committee also included such civic leaders as C. H. Lewis, Simeon G. Reed and William S. Ladd. The Bull Run reservoir, which they built below Mt. Hood, some 50 miles from Portland, brought gravity-fed mountain water to Portland along cast iron pipes, manufactured at Oswego, Oregon. The superbly designed system and its reservoirs was an enormous undertaking and still today supplies water to the city. The system was built in spite of opposition (water then came out of the Willamette River largely by private contractors) but both Ladd, as one of its leading proponents, along with Failing and Corbett were vindicated when it provided Portland with the cheapest water in the US after Niagara Falls, N.Y.

=== Business organizations ===
Corbett was a charter member of the Arlington Club in Portland; he was instrumental in organising the Portland Board of Trade and was for some years its president; he served on the United States Board of Trade Standing Committee of National Finance and Currency after its foundation in 1868; chaired the Committee of One Hundred, which proposed improvements to Portland's infrastructure. He was also a commissioner of immigration.

== Philanthropist and civic benefactor ==
The city was a major trading center and a bustling port (the largest after San Francisco on the West Coast). It shipped out lumber, wheat and flour and brought in manufactured goods.

Corbett's early business success made it possible for him to help provide the infrastructure that the sinews of commerce and industry required in a growing state and city, such as banking, transportation, railways, buildings, iron mining and steel, water, electricity and telegraph.

The flourishing city doubled in population every few years, but its isolation from the rest of the world meant that Portland welcomed each new group of arrivals and helped newcomers.

Its citizens began to envision Portland as a great city. In due course, there was a desire to participate in the world of culture and art. This became especially important to the leading families and civic leaders who had the means to introduce it to the city. As a frontier city, Portland merchants had traveled to all the main urban centers of the East (and to Europe and beyond) and had become aware of the culture, which was lacking in Portland.

Corbett was among Portland's successful businessmen who felt that a great city and civilized society required these elements and he set about helping establish and endow places of worship, educational and cultural institutions such as the Portland Art Gallery and the Portland Library. In all these institutions he was also an active participant, helping pick those most suitable for their boards and seeing to it that they flourished and contributed significantly to the community.

Leading Portland families began to collect fine books, art, furniture, oriental rugs and other fine objects for their homes. They also felt that culture and books should be available to all.

=== Portland Library Association ===
The Portland Library Building, built in 1893 to house library on ground floor & Portland Art Museum on the second floor (Oregon Historical Society)

In order to make books easily accessible, Portland merchants began to raise funds for a library and reading room in 1863. US District Court Judge Matthew P. Deady, with William S. Ladd, Henry Failing and others, formed the Portland Mercantile Library Association. In 1864, the association's name was changed to The Library Association of Portland and its constitution and bylaws were adopted. Corbett was one of the founding board members and a trustee. (Later the Portland Library Association became the Portland Central Library and is now the Multnomah County Central Library.)

The library gave access to books of reference to the citizens of Portland and was housed initially on the second floor of Benjamin Stark's building at First and Stark and then, courtesy of William S. Ladd, at one dollar a year, above the Ladd and Tilton Bank, where it moved to in 1869 and remained for 24 years.

It later moved, as a result of Judge Matthew Deady's leadership, to a purpose-built Romanesque stone building of its own in 1893 on the South side of Stark Street between Seventh (now Broadway) and Park with the Portland Art Museum occupying the second floor. The architect was William M. Whidden of Boston (formerly of McKim, Mead and White, later to found Portland's Whidden & Lewis). It was opened in 1893 under the Presidency of Henry Failing after a generous financial contribution from him to cover the fundraising shortfall. On Deady's death Failing had succeeded him as president. The present successor building designed by A. E. Doyle (on 10th Street between Taylor, Yamhill and 11th Streets) was opened in 1913 (where portraits of the founders, Judge Matthew Deady, Henry Failing, H. W . Corbett and W. S. Ladd hang on the staircase).

=== Portland Art Museum ===
Corbett conceived the idea of starting an art museum in Portland. The Portland Art Association was founded in 1892 "to make a collection of works of art and to erect and maintain a suitable building in which the same may be studied and exhibited." This institution was one of the first seven art museums to be established in the United States.

The first trustees were: Henry Failing, president; H.W. Corbett, vice-president; William M. Ladd (William S. Ladd's eldest son), treasurer; with four others: Holt C. Wilson, Thomas L. Eliot, W. B. Ayer and C. E. S. Wood. All these original trustees and their families later made donations of important artwork to the museum.

The original museum was located on the upper floor of the Library Association Building, and opened to the public in 1895 in an imposing Romanesque stone building on the South side of Stark Street between Seventh (now Broadway) and Park with the Portland Art Museum occupying the second floor. Greek casts commissioned by Corbett from the originals in the British Museum and from other important international collections went on display there.

Later Corbett donated in his will the property for the site of the first standalone Portland Art Museum Building together with an endowment for it. He and Caroline Elliott Ladd (Mrs. William S. Ladd), the widow of his former business associate and mother-in-law of his late eldest son (Henry Jagger Corbett), donated the additional funds for the construction of the building at SW Fifth and Taylor and the collection was moved from the second floor of the old Library Building and installed there in 1905.

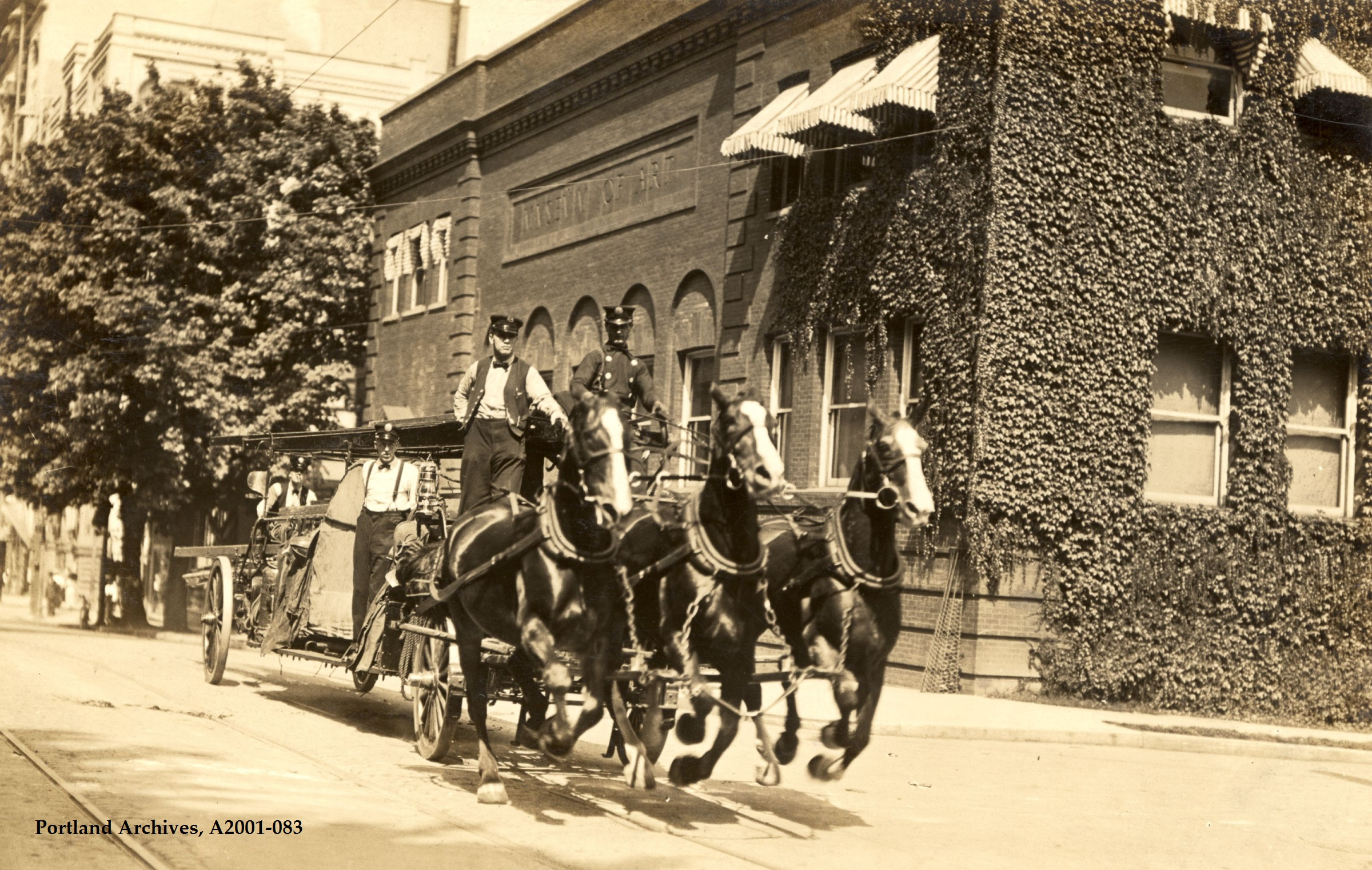
First Portland Museum of Art Building (with horse-drawn fire wagon passing). Opened 1905 Purpose-built building gift of Henry Corbett & Caroline Elliott Ladd (Mrs. William S. Ladd) (City of Portland (OR) Archives. Photo circa 1910)

In 1932, the Portland Art Museum moved to its present location at 1219 S.W. Park Avenue since expanded to take up a second adjoining Park block. H. W. Corbett and all the founding trustees' families made donations of art to the museum, which they added to over the decades and through following generations.

Since 1932, when the museum was given more than 750 traditional woodblock Japanese prints from the collection of Mary Andrews Ladd (and her husband William M. Ladd), the museum's Japanese print collection has grown to more than 2,500 works including remarkable works dating from late 17th century up to the present day. Some are unique to the Portland Art Museum, others extremely rare.

This was the beginning of the Portland Art Museum's pre-eminence as one of the most significant Japanese print repositories. The museum collection also ranges from important French and American Impressionists, Ancient Greek to modern American, African, pre-Columbian and Native American, sculpture, prints and silver.

William M. Ladd and his wife also amassed a major collection of over 5000 etchings including over 150 Rembrandts and probably one of the world's three most important collections of Whistler etchings (all of which his sister Helen Ladd, Mrs Henry Jagger Corbett, was also separately collecting in concert with him). The other significant Whistler print collections are the S. P. Avery Collection at The New York Public Library and the one at Glasgow University Hunterian Museum and University Library. The greatest part of the William M. Ladd etching collection now forms the "William Mead Ladd: H. V. Jones Bequest Whistler collection" at the Minneapolis Institute of Arts in the US Midwest (sold to them in 1917 for a significant amount). This sale was made after Ladd's decision to cover all the obligations on the failure of the Title Guarantee & Trust Company of which he held only a 30% stake at a cost to him of over $2.5 million, even though he was not legally liable to do so.

=== Others ===
Corbett was the founding President of the Portland Pioneer Association in 1872, the forerunner of the Oregon Historical Society, founded in 1892 (his grandson, Elliott R. Corbett, was a subsequent President of the OHS when he obtained the land where the Oregon Historical Society museum and building is now located on S.W. Park Avenue, opposite the Portland Art Museum. Prior to that, the Society had been housed in cramped space above the Portland Auditorium).

Corbett was a founder and trustee together with W. S. Ladd, Henry Failing and C. H. Lewis of the Portland Old Peoples' Home, Children's Home, Young Men's Christian Association (YMCA), City Board of Charities, Homeopathic Hospital. H.W.Corbett was also president of the Seamen's Friend Society, president of the Boys' and Girls' Aid Society (The home was built especially for children convicted of a first crime so they would not be thrown in prison among hardened criminals) and other charitable organizations set up to aid the less fortunate.

Education being one of Corbett's central interests, he founded the Portland Academy, a predecessor educational institution of the present Catlin Gabel school, and was a long-time supporter (and on the board of trustees) of Tualatin Academy and Pacific University. He was also a trustee and one of the largest donors to Albany Collegiate Institute, now Lewis & Clark College. His philanthropy saved the fledgling college from closing in its early years.

He was also president of the board of trustees of the First Presbyterian Church of Portland, and he provided funds towards the erection of the church, built in basalt and sandstone with a spire. He also supported other Presbyterian churches throughout the Pacific Northwest and Trinity Episcopal Cathedral of Portland.

Corbett, Ladd and Failing bought the first 286 acres (later increased) to create the non-profit River View Cemetery on the Willamette River in 1879 (where they themselves were later buried at the top of the hill in their family plots next door to each other).

H.W. Corbett donated substantial amounts to charitable causes and institutions during his lifetime and bequeathed endowments of about a tenth of his estate to a number in his will, as had been his practise from his annual incomes when alive. These included the Portland Art Association (endowment, works of art and land for a new art museum building), The Children's Home, the Young Men's Christian Association, the Portland Academy (to endow a chair for a professor of penmanship and bookkeeping "to the end that penmanship might not become a lost art absolutely"), the Presbyterian Board of Home Missions, money for the building of a Home for Old Ladies (later known as the Anna Lewis Mann Old People's Home), the Boys and Girls Aid Society and the Presbyterian Board for Relief for Disabled Ministers, Widows and Orphans.

== Personal life ==
In 1853 Henry W. Corbett had married Caroline E. Jagger (Oct 26, 1829 – July 27, 1865), of Albany, New York. They had two sons Henry Jagger Corbett (Nov 6 1857 – March 2, 1895), and Hamilton Forbush Corbett (Dec 1 1859 - Oct 12 1884).

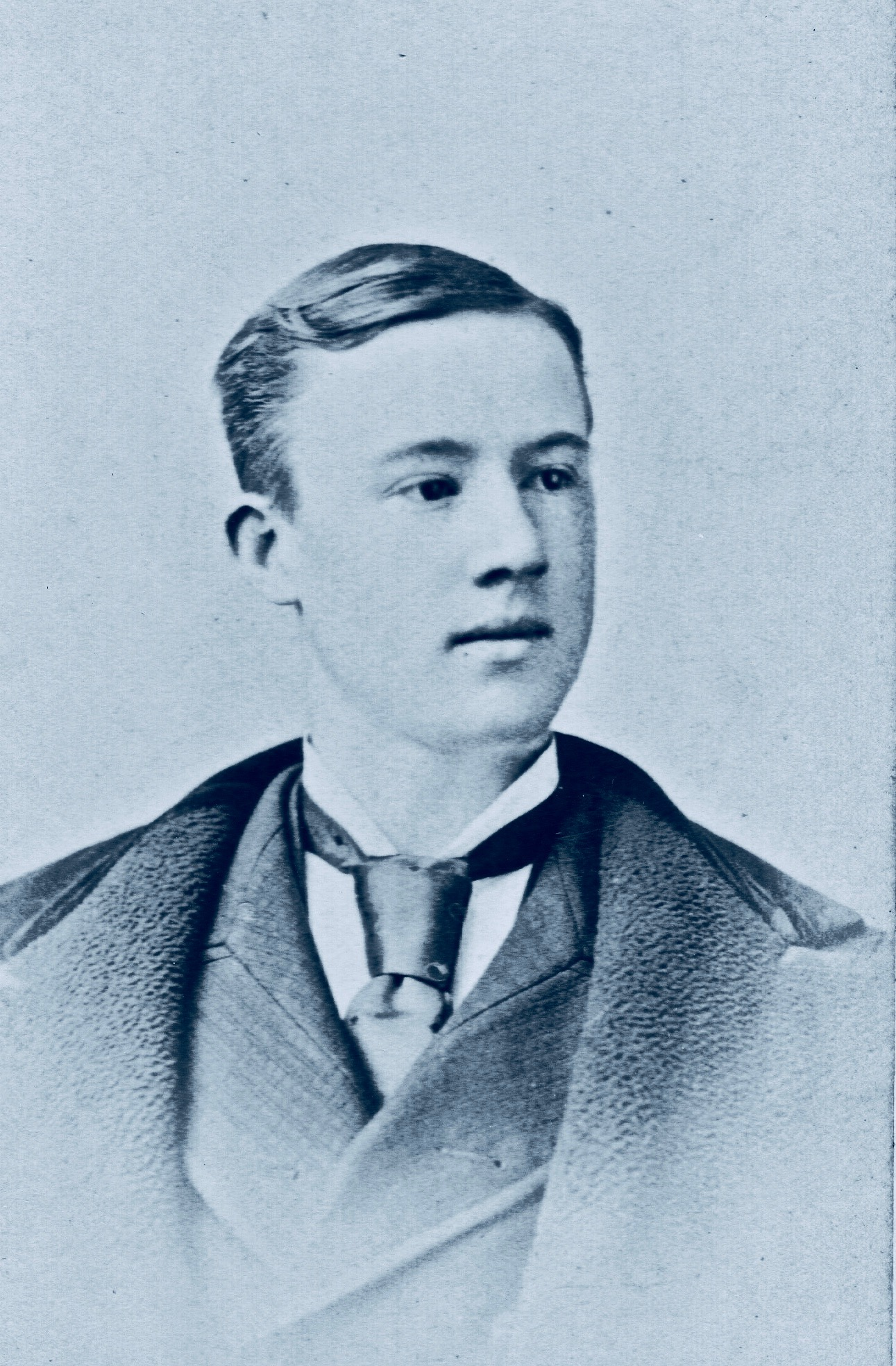
Henry Jagger Corbett, April 1876 (18 years). H. W. Corbett's eldest son predeceased him at age 37 leaving his widow Helen Kendall Ladd Corbett and three sons.

After his first wife's death in 1865, aged 35, he married a second time, in 1867, Miss Emma L. Ruggles (Sept 30, 1846 – July 4, 1936.) of Worcester, Massachusetts. They had no offspring. She acted as hostess at his side when he was U.S. Senator in Washington. She died aged 89 in the H. W. Corbett residence in downtown Portland.

Eldest son Henry J. Corbett married William S. Ladd's eldest daughter Helen Kendall Ladd in 1879, and they had three sons Henry Ladd Corbett (July 29, 1881 – April 22, 1957), Elliott Ruggles Corbett (June 29, 1884 – May 2, 1963), and Hamilton Forbush Corbett (Dec 13, 1888 – May 7, 1966). These grandsons assumed responsibility for the estate and enterprises of Henry Winslow Corbett after he died on March 31, 1903.

Both Corbett's sons predeceased him. They died of tuberculosis while still young men.

H.W.Corbett wrote in his own hand to his eldest son Henry J. Corbett on his 21st birthday on November 6, 1878, a letter which sheds an interesting light on both:

My dear son Henry,

This day you take upon yourself the dignity of manhood, to you it is no great change, you were always a little man, when young in years. But today you set out upon the Sea of Life, with all its cares, with much responsibility and many obligations assumed by me, and to be transmitted in part to you.

This day may mark an epoch in your life, whether you are to live for self alone, or whether you will mark out for your self, a course, that shall make your name beloved and honoured amongst those with whom your life is cast and receive the blessings of Devine Providence, I trust you will cultivate in your heart a love to do good to the helpless and unfortunate, be forward in helping good works, by word and deed, give of your substance that Good has intrusted to your care at least 1/10 of your net income, let this be a covenant with your Heavenly Father, as it has been mine for many years, if you be faithful he will make you his trustee to dispense much of his bounty, if you are unfaithful he may take away that which you have.

Therefore forget not that you have a higher and more important part to act in life, than simply ministering to your own daily wants.

Remember a loving Mother, a tender brother, and join with them in council, if it so happen, that they may need the aid of your good judgement and wise caution, hold not back, let each aid and council with the others. We know not what a day may bring forth, let us all live so that we may hope for a meeting beyond this life of probation. I trust that none of you may ever be obliged to struggle with adversity, and that all dark clouds may have a silver lining and that you may be honored and loved, is the sincere wish of

Your affectionate Father,

Henry W. Corbett

=== Oregon residences ===
H.W. Corbett and Henry Failing residences (centre & right) in their Portland city blocks (Oregon Historical Society)

After his death, his widow Emma continued to live until her death in 1936, aged 89, in the Corbett residence in downtown Portland on Taylor Street (the property occupied the whole Portland city block fronted by S.W. Taylor between 5th and 6th Avenues and backed by S.W. Yamhill). H.W. Corbett had originally built a Greek Revival style house there in 1854 that was brought around the Horn in 1852 and described as "the first elegant residence to have been built" in Portland but it was replaced by a more imposing three-story Second Empire style structure in 1874. With its Corinthian style columns and porches with balustrades, this was the first time full Classical details were used in Portland. The layout was designed for entertaining.

(When President Grant's recently retired eight year Ambassador to France, visited in June 1874, he told Mrs Corbett that in Paris they would bestow the "Cordon Bleu" upon her cook." The Corbetts had first engaged their cook when Corbett was a US senator and they had bought a house in Washington, D.C. She had been Lincoln's cook and had come on to them after the President's death. Afterwards she continued to cook for the Corbetts in Oregon )

Their residence was the last of the great houses in Portland to be built in the Second Empire style (the fashion had been influenced by Napoleon III and Empress Eugénie's reconstruction of the Louvre). The Henry W. Corbett mansion differed radically from the earlier Portland residences built in the same style. At 825 SW Fifth Avenue the house reflected ideas from buildings that Corbett had seen on his European travels, when he had gathering sketches on architectural styles. It borrowed the giant pediment designs from the older buildings of the Louvre designed by Du Cerceau. He and his neighbour Henry Failing had returned from Europe with art to fill their homes, decorating their walls with stencilling and painting their ceilings with 'frescoes' in the most fashionable styles of the day.

However, a few years after Corbett's death it was not the house that became the center of attention. It was 'Mrs. Corbett's cow', which grazed in the landscaped and tree shaded field adjoining the house located in the centre of Portland. Eventually the elegant home, set in its own city block, was surrounded by office buildings, but Mrs. Corbett and the family cow seemingly refused to be intimidated by their new neighbors. This unusual sight was dubbed 'the Million Dollar Cow Pasture' and became one of Portland's sights for visitors and locals alike.

The site on which house, garden and coachhouse stood is now the location of The Duniway Portland, a Hilton Hotel, formerly Portland Hilton Hotel Executive Tower. The hotel's entrance at 545 SW Taylor is almost exactly where the entrance to the coach house had been. The house was situated a bit further East on Taylor nearer 5th Avenue. The cow pasture was located on the other (northern) half of the block (at the back of the house) opposite the Pioneer Court House. The cow pasture half block is where her grandsons Henry L. Corbett, Elliott R. Corbett and Hamilton F. Corbett later built the present Pacific Building overlooking the Pioneer Court House.

Corbett had a farm, the Highlands, that he used as a summer retreat, which he had purchased in 1885 high up on the Columbia River Gorge on the bluff with a panoramic view overlooking the river at the point where it bends somewhat northward. A little over ninety years before, in 1792, the river below had first been seen by a white man when it was charted by one of Captain George Vancouver's ships. Ten years later, this bluff had first been gazed upon by the first Americans to come overland to the West when Lewis and Clark passed by on the river below. And around 1812 David Thompson had been the first to map its wilderness for the Hudson's Bay Company. The farm gave the name to the town of Corbett, later established nearby (the house no longer stands but a gazebo and the great barn remain). The farm was reached by one of Corbett's rail cars after the ORNC railway had been built along the gorge. Visitors disembarked at the Corbett stop (before the road was built) so there was already a Corbett station of sorts when the town was founded.

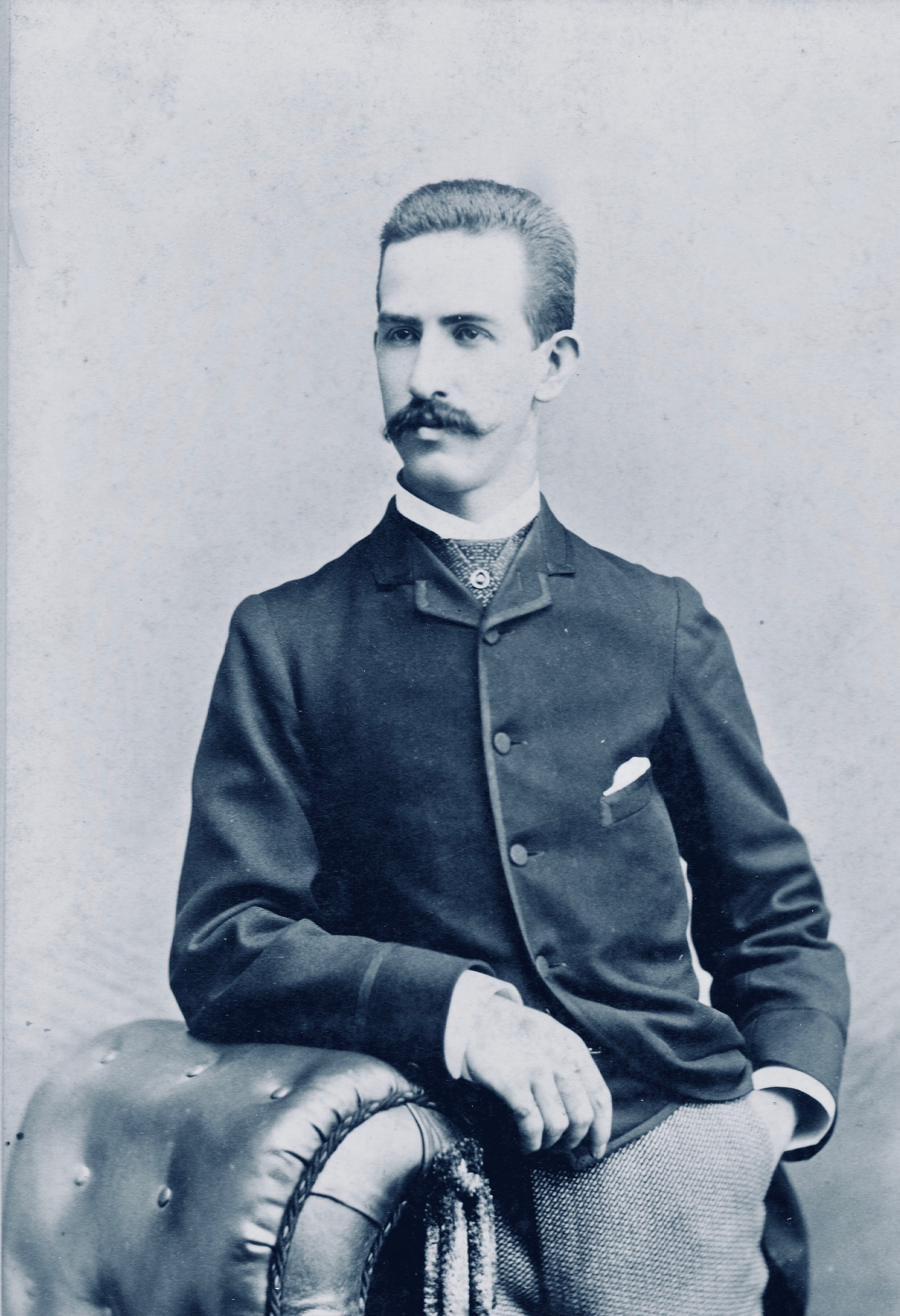
H. W. Corbett's eldest son Henry Jagger Corbett (circa 1887) sometime after his marriage to Helen Kendall Ladd

In 1892 Corbett and his wife built a seaside home The Pines in Seaview, Washington, north of the Columbia River, which still stands there (now run as a resort inn).

=== Named after H.W. Corbett ===
Corbett Avenue in SW Portland is named in his honour.

The town of Corbett, Oregon, on the Columbia Gorge where he had a farm is named after him.

Henry W. Corbett had a World War II 'Liberty' ship named after him (as did other Portland pioneers Henry Failing and William S. Ladd). They were built by the Kaiser's Oregon Shipbuilding Corporation in their new shipyards in Portland.

The SS Henry W. Corbett (#1616) was launched on March 29, 1943, by Mrs. Henry Ladd Corbett. The keel had been laid only twenty days earlier on March 9, 1943. This ship was afterwards lent to the Russian war effort. A portrait of Stalin was found hanging alongside the one of H. W. Corbett in a Russian port when a younger relation went on board. The SS Henry W. Corbett was never returned and was later renamed by the Russians the Alexander Nevsky after their thirteenth century warrior prince and saint. It was scrapped in 1978.

The SS Henry Failing (#1621) was launched on April 7, 1943, and sailed as a US navy ship and troop transport. It was scrapped in Everett, Washington in 1961.

The SS William S. Ladd (#2084) was launched on September 13, 1943, and was sunk by Kamikaze attack on December 10, 1944, 11 miles south of Dulag, Leyte, Pacific Islands.

Among his descendants are Gretchen Corbett and Winslow Corbett, television and stage actresses.

== Lewis and Clark Centennial Exposition ==
In later years Corbett was responsible (as President of the Portland Pioneer Association) for the planning of the Lewis and Clark Centennial Exposition, the Portland world's fair (officially named the Lewis and Clark Centennial and American Pacific Exposition and Oriental Fair) earning him the accolade of "Father of the Exposition" (Corbett was also one of its main benefactors). It would be the first world's fair on the West Coast and became known as "The Great Extravaganza".

It would be modelled on the successful 1876 Centennial Exposition in Philadelphia, the 1893 Chicago World's Fair (World's Columbian Exposition), and a 1904 Fair scheduled for St. Louis (the Louisiana Purchase Exposition). As chair, H.W. Corbett chose the blue-ribbon executive board, whose membership was ratified by a mass citizen's meeting in November 1901.

The extent of his lifetime achievement, together with that of his fellow Portland pioneers, became evident when he presided in 1901 over these arrangements in the cosmopolitan city that Portland had become only fifty years after he had first arrived in the tiny rough frontier "stump town" that had been incorporated in the year he arrived, 1851. The exposition attracted participating nations from all over the world to general acclaim. It opened on June 1, 1905, and was staged for four and half months closing October 15, 1905.

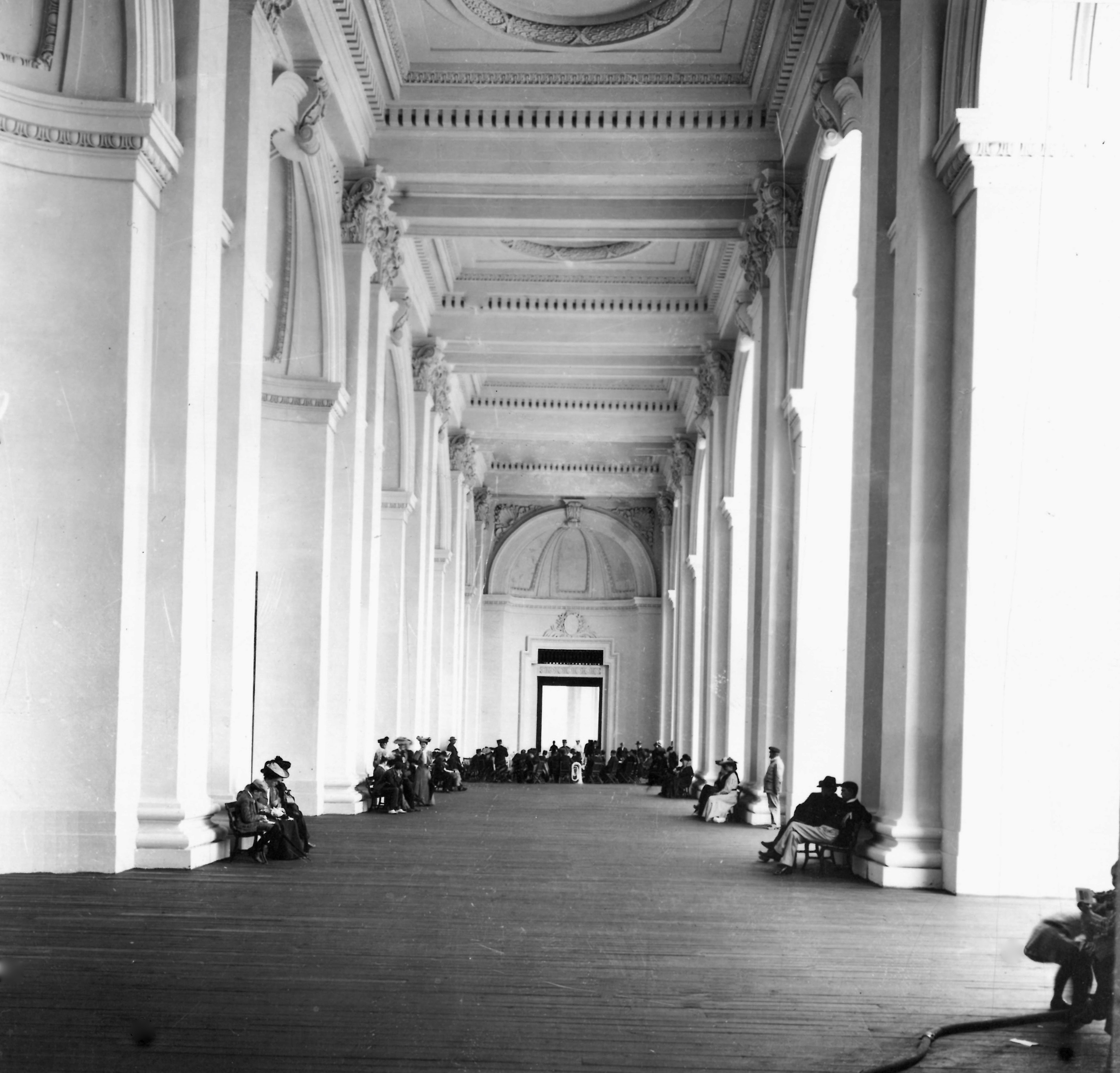
Lewis and Clark Exposition US Government Building portico Portland, Oregon. 1905 (Oregon Historical Society)

Apart from the State of Oregon, the US government and another 18 US states, 20 foreign nations participated with Japan's million-dollar exhibit being the largest. The participating nations were the US, Japan, Great Britain, the British Empire nations, Italy, France, Germany, Russia, Switzerland, the Netherlands, Hungary and Austria. During its four and a half months, 1,588,000 paying visitors passed through the gates to the 400-acre fairgrounds. More than 400,000 were from outside the Pacific Northwest, a huge number of visitors for a city of approximately 120,000 residents. It did much to demonstrate the national status of the United States as having become not just an Atlantic but a Pacific nation and a gateway to Asia. Portland in the process became a city of world note in 1905. The Exposition that Henry W. Corbett had done much to bring to life opened two years after his death.

The Oregonian, June 3, 1905, wrote on the opening:

This is a time when it should be said that the Lewis and Clark Exposition and its splendid results are due to the late Henry W. Corbett. It was he who gave it the first forward movement. He took hold of it with all his accustomed energy, subscribing a heavy sum of money to start it, and gave to the work of organizing it the last earnest efforts of his life.

== Death reported ==
Corbett died in Portland on March 31, 1903, at the age of 76.

The Morning Oregonian headlined his death on its front page and devoted all of its page 10 and part of page 11 in reporting his death the following day:

H. W. CORBETT – Portland's Foremost Citizen Passes Away – EX-SENATOR AND PIONEER – His Heart Ceases to Beat and End Comes Painlessly – LAST DAY SPENT AT WORK. "Henry Winslow Corbett for over half a century a foremost citizen of Portland is dead. ... Mr Corbett was one of the father's of Portland."

The Oregon Journal, the evening paper, headlined the report on its front page and continued it on its second page on the day of his death:

A NOBLE CAREER ENDS IN THE DEATH OF HONOURABLE HENRY WINSLOW CORBETT - Oregon's Sterling Citizen Called Suddenly to Eternity - Valuable Life of the Great Man of Oregon - Always Prominent in the Affairs of the State - Kind and Gentle of Disposition and Beloved by All.

The Daily Oregon Statesman in the state's capitol Salem, led with and used most of its front page in reporting the event on the afternoon of his death with:

GRAND OLD MAN OF OREGON DEAD - Hon. Henry W. Corbett Ex-United States Senator Expires in Portland - Was One of Oregon's Most Honoured Citizens and His Death Will Cause a Vacancy Which Will Be Most Difficult to Fulfill—Was One of the Principal Builders of State and Portland---Prominent in Politics.

== Archives and records ==
- Henry Winslow Corbett papers at Baker Library Special Collections, Harvard Business School
- Henry Winslow Corbett papers, Oregon Historical Society archives, Portland, Oregon.

U.S. Senate
Preceded by James W. Nesmith	U.S. senator (Class 3) from Oregon; 1867–1873; Served alongside: George H. Williams, James K. Kelly	Succeeded by John H. Mitchell
