= Lucy in the Sky (soundtrack) =

Lucy in the Sky (Original Motion Picture Soundtrack)

Film score by Jeff Russo
- Released: October 4, 2019
- Genre: Film score
- Length: 80:49
- Label: Lakeshore
- Producer: Jeff Russo

Jeff Russo chronology
Mile 22 (2018)	Lucy in the Sky (Original Motion Picture Soundtrack) (2019)	Lorelei (2021)

Lucy in the Sky (Original Motion Picture Soundtrack) is the soundtrack to the 2019 film Lucy in the Sky, directed by Noah Hawley. The film score is composed by Jeff Russo and released through Lakeshore Records on October 4, 2019. The vinyl edition of the album was issued by Mondo which released it on June 19, 2020.

== Development ==
Jeff Russo composed the musical score for Lucy in the Sky; he previously worked with Hawley in the television series Fargo (2014–present) and Legion (2017–2019). When Hawley narrated the script to Noah, the former wanted "to fashion the story of this woman [breaking] down, but also have a bit of magical realism." According to Russo, the emotional place of the film was to track the feelings of the character losing herself. He admitted that as the character goes to space, she faces the existential moment where she sees her whole life before her and the whole universe and then feeling small when she gets back."

As Lucy in the Sky being a terrestrial film set in space, he was not intimidated by other space films. He created specific instruments to give sounds that he had not heard and then could write melodies based on it. He wrote the score for two months while one of his friends helped him built the instruments that formed the basis for the score. He used a bow drone that provided a "low, resonant tone" and strings and harp in low registers that operated the bow drone. Most of the score had been composed with the help of this instrument. The vocals were provided by Lisa Hannigan. She performed a cover of the Beatles' song "Lucy in the Sky with Diamonds" (1967) with Russo. Other lead vocals were provided by Gary Stockdale.

== Reception ==
Tim Grierson of Screen International wrote "Jeff Russo’s grandiose score feels designed for an interstellar epic, even though the story is actually quite intimate". Peter Debruge of Variety and Todd McCarthy of The Hollywood Reporter called the score to be "intense" and "atmospheric". Christopher John of The Curb described it as "an excellent score by Jeff Russo".

== Track listing ==
Lucy in the Sky (Original Motion Picture Soundtrack) track listing
No.	Title	Length
1.	"Main Titles – Why Are We Here"	4:56
2.	"Cosmic Pickup (Theme 5)"	2:24
3.	"Running On the Track"	0:45
4.	"Lucy's Percussion"	2:34
5.	"Suit Breach (NBL)"	4:02
6.	"We Can Go to My Place"	1:34
7.	"The Wake"	1:45
8.	"Feel the Feeling"	1:00
9.	"Changing Clothes" (alt)	2:43
10.	"Inconsistent – Liftoff"	3:01
11.	"You're Gonna Lose"	1:12
12.	"Airport Arrival"	0:44
13.	"Lucy Exits Car"	0:51
14.	"Feel It All"	4:37
15.	"Lucy's Pressure (Theme 1 H&M Test)"	8:59
16.	"Bees"	1:08
17.	"Lucy's Theme (Theme 4)"	9:30
18.	"Lucy Floats (Theme 2 OP 174)"	6:38
19.	"End Credits Suite"	4:32
20.	"Lucy in the Sky with Diamonds" (featuring Lisa Hannigan)	5:31
21.	"Insomnia II – Cocoon"	1:59
22.	"Following Mark"	1:02
23.	"Lucy's Poem"	2:07
24.	"Back in Space"	1:48
25.	"Homecoming"	1:05
26.	"Butterfly"	0:35
27.	"Someone Else"	0:57
28.	"Bees" (alt version)	2:50
Total length:		80:49

== Release history ==
Release dates and formats for Lucy in the Sky (Original Motion Picture Soundtrack)
Region	Date	Format(s)	Label	Ref.
Various	October 4, 2019	Digital download; streaming	Lakeshore Records	
Various	June 19, 2020	Vinyl	Mondo	
