= Gretchen Corbett =

American actress and theater director (born 1945)

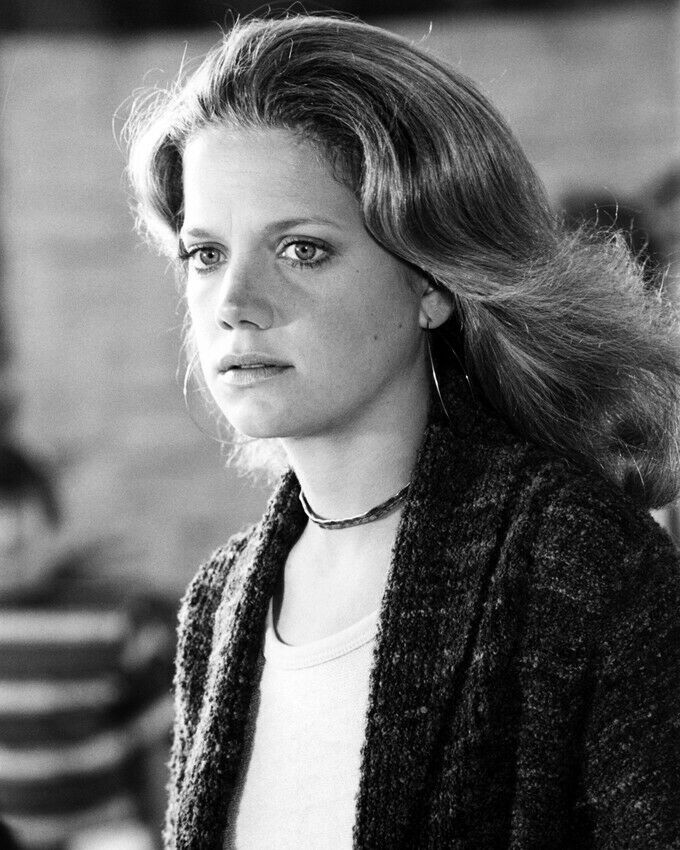
- Corbett in 1975
- Born: Gretchen Hoyt Corbett; August 13, 1945 (age 81) (Note: Corbett's year of birth is variously given as 1947 and 1945.); Portland, Oregon, U.S. (Note: Some sources state Corbett was born in Camp Sherman, Oregon, though a 1985 article notes her birthplace as Portland; another article published the same year notes that Corbett spent her early life in Camp Sherman, but was not born there.)
- Occupations: Actress; theater director
- Years active: 1966–present
- Partner: Robin Gammell
- Children: Winslow Corbett
- Relatives: Henry L. Corbett (grandfather); Henry W. Corbett (great-great-grandfather)

Gretchen Hoyt Corbett (born August 13, 1945) is an American actress and theater director. She is primarily known for her roles in television, particularly as attorney Beth Davenport on the NBC series The Rockford Files, but has also had a prolific career as a stage actress on Broadway as well as in regional theater.

A native of Oregon and the great-great-granddaughter of Oregon U.S. Senator Henry W. Corbett, she spent her early life in Camp Sherman and Portland, where she graduated from the Catlin Gabel School. Corbett studied drama at Carnegie Mellon University before making her stage debut in a production of Othello at the Oregon Shakespeare Festival. She subsequently appeared in lead roles on Broadway in After the Rain (1967) and Forty Carats (1968), opposite Julie Harris. She also starred off-Broadway in the title role of Iphigenia in Aulis (1968), and as Joan la Pucelle in Shakespeare's Henry VI, staged at Central Park's Delacorte Theater in 1970. She starred as Jeanne d'Arc in The Survival of St. Joan between 1970 and 1971.

She made her feature film debut in the comedy Out of It (1969), followed by a supporting role in the cult horror film Let's Scare Jessica to Death (1971). In 1972, Corbett signed a contract with Universal Studios, and appeared in numerous television films and series for the studio, while simultaneously working in summer stock theater on the East Coast. Between 1974 and 1978, she starred as the idealistic attorney Beth Davenport on the NBC series The Rockford Files, opposite James Garner. Corbett subsequently starred in the horror film Jaws of Satan (1981), and the drama Million Dollar Infield (1982), directed by Hal Cooper.

For the majority of the 1980s, Corbett appeared in guest-starring roles on numerous television series, including Cheers (1983) and Magnum, P.I. (1981–1983), and starred in the short-lived Otherworld (1985). In 1988, she starred in the original workshop stage production of The Heidi Chronicles for the Seattle Repertory Theatre. She later had minor parts in the films Without Evidence (1995) and A Change of Heart (1998). Since the 2000s, Corbett has served as the artistic director of the Portland-based Haven Project, a theater project serving underprivileged children, and appeared in numerous stage productions at the Portland Center Stage as well as the city's Third Rail Repertory. She returned to television with a recurring character on the IFC series Portlandia in 2013, and had a guest-starring role on the Hulu series Shrill in 2019.

== 1945–1965: Early life ==
Gretchen Hoyt Corbett was born August 13, 1945. Corbett's year of birth is variously given as 1947 and 1945. in Portland, Oregon to Henry Ladd Corbett, Jr. and Katherine Minahen (née Coney) "Kay" Corbett. She is a great-great-granddaughter of Oregon pioneer, businessman, and Senator Henry Winslow Corbett, and granddaughter of Henry Ladd Corbett, a Portland civic leader, businessman, and politician. The community of Corbett, Oregon is named for her great-great-grandfather. Through her paternal ancestry, she is of English descent, with ancestors originating from Essex, Norfolk, and Suffolk. Corbett has two brothers and one sister.

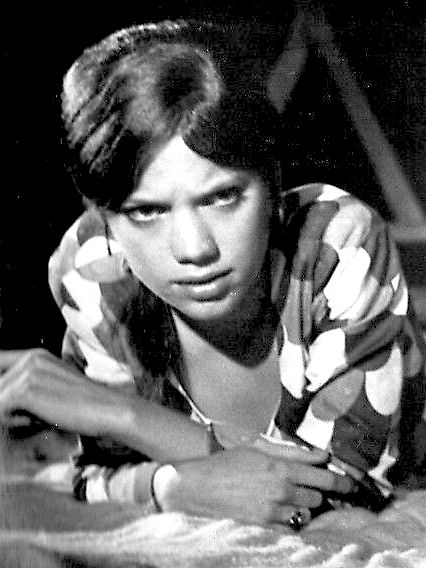
Corbett in Out of It 1969

Corbett's father, tired of the city, relocated the family to rural Camp Sherman, Oregon, where she spent her early life. "I rode my horse to school every day, four miles each way," she recalled in a 1985 interview. "I hated it then, but, in retrospect, it was a marvelous life and a great way to grow up." The family eventually returned to Portland in her later childhood, where her mother worked as an administrator at the University of Portland. At age seven, Corbett was inspired to become an actress after attending the Oregon Shakespeare Festival.

Corbett attended the Catlin Gabel School in Portland, and as a teenager apprenticed with the Carnival Theatre camp at the University of Oregon. She studied drama at Pittsburgh's Carnegie Tech (before its merger with the Mellon Institute of Industrial Research to form Carnegie Mellon University in 1967), but dropped out after her first year of studies to begin working as a full-time actress.

== Career ==
=== 1966–1972: Stage and early films ===
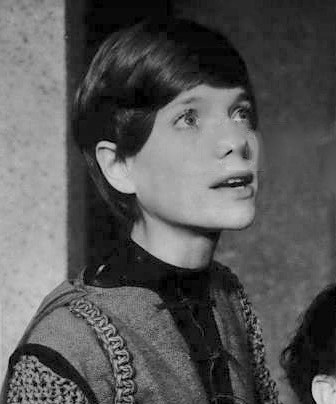
Corbett as Jeanne d'Arc in The Survival of St. Joan, 1970

Corbett made her stage debut as Desdemona in a production of Othello at the Oregon Shakespeare Festival in 1966. She subsequently appeared in productions with the New Orleans Repertory Theater in 1967. The same year, she was cast as Sonya Banks in the Broadway production of After the Rain with Alec McCowen. In 1968, she appeared in The Bench at the Gramercy Arts Theatre, and in the title role in Iphigenia in Aulis at the Circle in the Square Theatre, opposite Irene Papas. She subsequently co-starred with Julie Harris in the Broadway production of Forty Carats, staged at the Morosco Theatre.

One of Corbett's first television roles was on ABC's short-lived police detective show, N.Y.P.D., in 1968; in the episode, "The Case of the Shady Lady", Corbett played a dancer who tries to make her husband's suicide into a murder for the insurance money. Corbett made her feature film debut in the comedy Out of It (1969), co-starring with Jon Voight. She then appeared in the cult horror film Let's Scare Jessica to Death (1971). Meanwhile, between 1970 and 1971, Corbett starred as Jeanne d'Arc in a New York production of The Survival of St. Joan. She also appeared in The Government Inspector with David Dukes and John Glover at The Phoenix Theatre.

=== 1973–1978: The Rockford Files; television ===
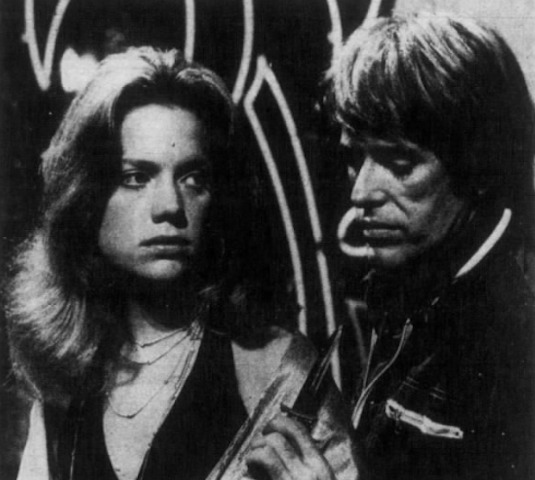
Corbett and Jack Colvin in Knuckle (1975)

Corbett moved to Los Angeles under contract to Universal Studios, as one of the last contract players. Her first role under contract was in "Conspiracy of Fear" the ninth episode of Kojak (1973). The same year, she appeared in stage productions of Tennessee Williams's Summer and Smoke, and Shakespeare's As You Like It (portraying Rosalind), held at Drew University in New Jersey. Under her Universal contract, Corbett guest-starred in numerous network series in 1974, including Columbo, Gunsmoke, and Banacek.

In 1974, Corbett joined the cast of NBC's The Rockford Files where she played Beth Davenport, the beleaguered lawyer and sometimes lover of series lead Jim Rockford, a private investigator portrayed by James Garner. She appears in 33 episodes (including one uncredited voice-over). During Christmas 1974, Corbett survived a house fire at her residence in Hollywood, California, which destroyed nearly all of her belongings and left her with minor injuries. After completing the first season of The Rockford Files, Corbett starred in a televised production of the play Knuckle (1975), part of PBS's Hollywood Television Theater, as well as guest-starring on the series Hawaii Five-O and McMillan & Wife. On September 13, 1975 she appeared in the television series Emergency! as flight stewardess Sue Hickman who started a relationship with Gage after an in flight emergency brought the two together. In that same season, on March 6, 1976, she appeared as a therapy nurse who helped Gage as he recovered from being hit by a car. She also appeared in Marcus Welby, M.D., playing the stepmother of a young boy molested by his teacher.

Corbett appeared as Penny in another PBS televised play, George Kelly's The Fatal Weakness, opposite Eva Marie Saint and Dennis Dugan.

In 1978, Corbett left The Rockford Files at the end of the fourth season over a dispute between the show's producers and Universal, who owned Corbett's contract as a contract player.

=== 1981–present: Film, television and theater ===
Corbett starred in the horror film Jaws of Satan (1981), playing a doctor implicated in a preacher's battle with a snake which is Satan incarnate. In 1982, she starred as Roxane in a production of The Carome Brothers' Italian Food Products Corp.'s Annual Pasta Pageant at the Long Wharf Theatre in New Haven, Connecticut. In 1985, she starred in the science fiction series Otherworld. In 1988, Corbett starred in the original workshop production of Wendy Wasserstein's The Heidi Chronicles at the Seattle Repertory Theatre.

Corbett reprised her role of Beth Davenport in the Rockford Files television films of the 1990s, including Friends and Foul Play, If the Frame Fits... (both 1996) and If It Bleeds... It Leads (1999).

Between 2013 and 2014, Corbett appeared in a recurring guest role on the IFC series Portlandia. In 2014, she directed a production of the play Bo-Nita at Portland Center Stage. In 2019, she appeared in the Hulu series Shrill, opposite Luka Jones and Aidy Bryant. In late 2019, Corbett began filming the independent drama Pig, starring Nicolas Cage, Adam Arkin, and Alex Wolff. She also appeared in Lorelei, starring Pablo Schreiber and Jena Malone, which was released in 2021.

=== The Haven Project ===
In the 2000s, Corbett served as Artistic Director of the Haven Project, a theatre project for underprivileged children in Portland, Oregon, a replication of New York's 52nd St. Project.

== Personal life ==
Corbett had a relationship with Robin Gammell. Her daughter is actress Winslow Corbett.
