= Jon Korkes =

American actor (1945–2025/2026)

- Born: Jonathan David Korkes; December 4, 1945; New York, U.S.
- Died: December 31, 2025 (aged 80); New York, U.S.
- Occupation: Actor
- Years active: 1968–2025

Jonathan David Korkes (December 4, 1945 – December 31, 2025) was an American film, stage and television actor. He was best known for playing the recurring role of corrections officer Tom Robinson in the American drama television series Oz from 2001 to 2003.

== Life and career ==
Korkes was born in New York, and was raised in Marblehead, Massachusetts. He attended and graduated from Marblehead High School. He first worked in the theater in Jules Feiffer's Little Murders, directed by Alan Arkin, in 1968. He later began acting in film and television, as his credits include All in the Family (and its spin-off Maude), The Front Page, Dr. Vegas, The Day of the Dolphin, Two-Minute Warning, The Mary Tyler Moore Show, Getting Away with Murder, Starsky & Hutch, Riding in Cars with Boys, Catch-22, The Outside Man, The Larry Sanders Show, The Out-of-Towners, Homicide: Life on the Street and The Rookies.

Korkes died in New York on December 31, 2025, at the age of 80.

== Filmography ==
- The Out-of-Towners (1970) as Looter
- Catch-22 (1970) as Snowden
- Little Murders (1971) as Kenny Newquist
- The Outside Man (1972) as First Hawk
- Cinderella Liberty (1973) as Dental Corpsman
- The Day of the Dolphin (1973) as David
- The Front Page (1974) as Rudy Keppler
- Two-Minute Warning (1976) as Jeffrey
- Between the Lines (1977) as Frank
- Jaws of Satan (1981) as Dr. Paul Hendricks
- Worth Winning (1989) as Sam
- Syngenor (1990) as Tim Calhoun
- Too Much Sun (1990) as Fuzby Robinson
- Getting Away with Murder (1996) as Chemistry Lab Professor
- Riding in Cars with Boys (2001) as Counselor
- The Double (2013) as Detective
