= Catlin Gabel School =

Private school in Oregon, United States

Location
- 8825 SW Barnes Road; Portland, Oregon 97225; United States; 45.509819°N 122.767373°W

Information
- Type: Independent private
- Opened: 1957
- Head: Aline García Rubio
- Grades: Preschool–12
- Enrollment: 760 (2014)
- Student to teacher ratio: 6.3:1
- Campus: Suburban, 67 acres (27 ha)
- Colors: Royal blue and white
- Athletics conference: OSAA Lewis & Clark League 3A-1
- Mascot: Eagles
- Rival: Oregon Episcopal School
- Accreditation: NAAS
- Newspaper: CatlinSpeak
- Annual tuition: $29,700 (preschool and kindergarten) to $37,025 (high school)
- Website: www.catlin.edu
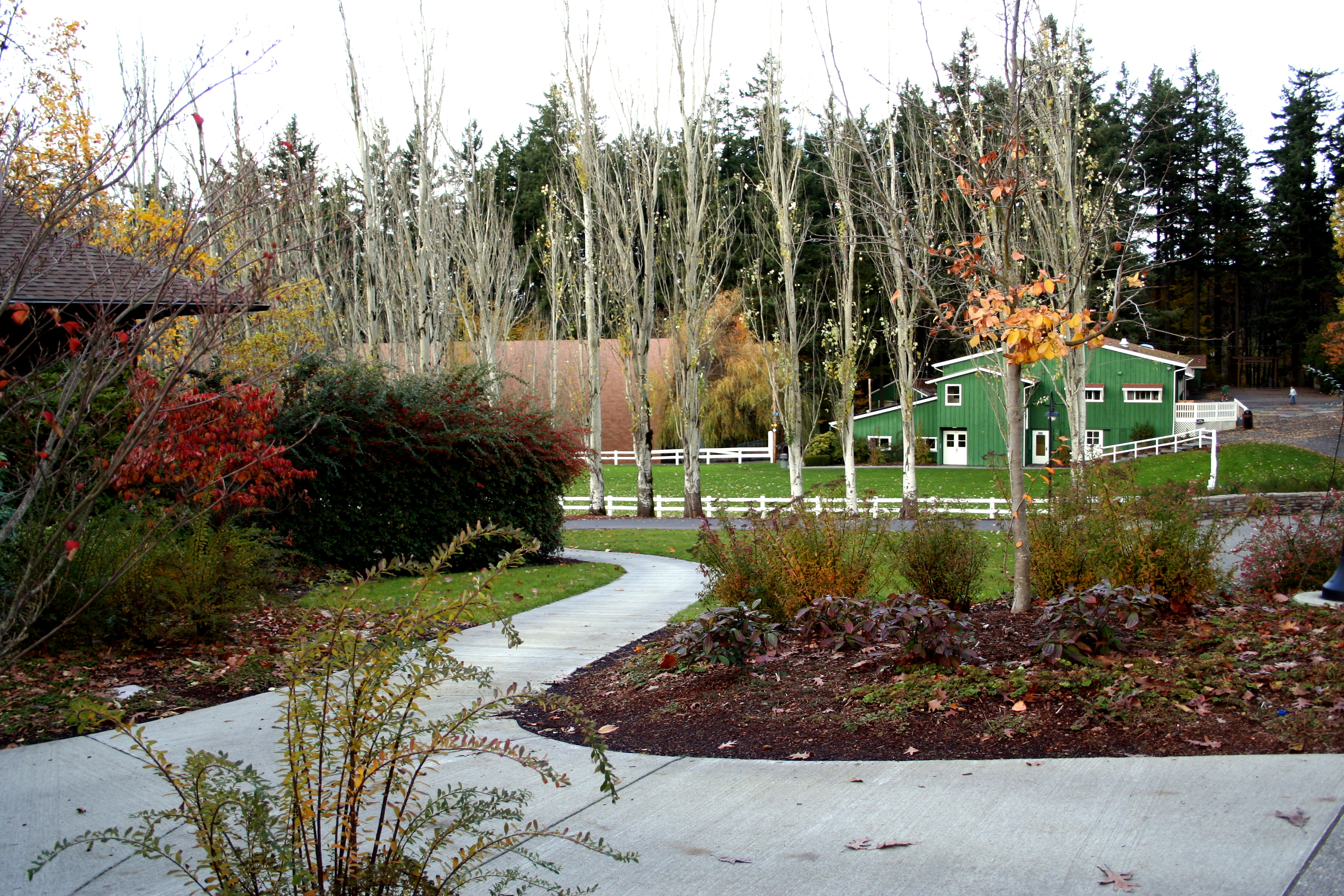
- Upper School Walkway

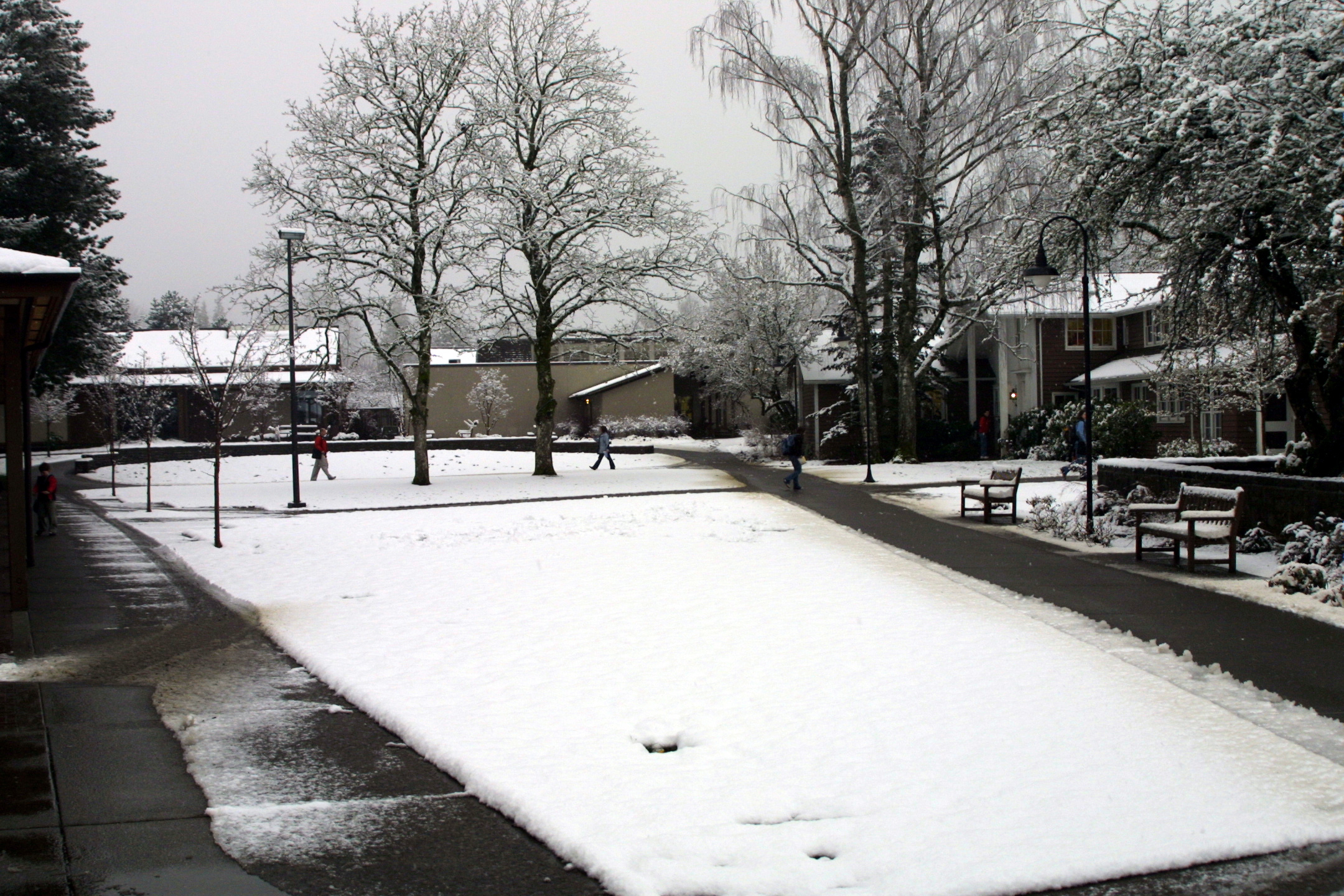
- The quad during a snowfall

The Catlin Gabel School (Catlin Gabel, Catlin, or CGS) is a private preschool–12 school located in West Haven-Sylvan in Washington County, Oregon, with a Portland, Oregon postal address. Annual enrollment is approximately 780 students from across the Portland metro area.

== History ==
The school was formed by the 1957 merger between the Catlin Hillside School (founded in 1911 as Miss Catlin's School, named after the founder Ruth Catlin) and the Gabel Country Day School (originating as the Portland Academy, named after founder Priscilla Gabel). The school had initially hoped to expand onto the Gabel school property, but lost it to eminent domain. Since the Catlin property was too small to support the school, Catlin Gabel purchased the Honey Hollow Farm in 1958, relocating the Upper School there in the fall. Nine years later, the Middle School relocated there, followed by the Lower School a year later, in 1968. The school sold the Catlin Hillside buildings to the Portland Art Museum for its art school. The buildings were later converted to a community center for the Hillside neighborhood.

Catlin Gabel received a $3.8 million bequest from Howard Vollum (co-founder of Tektronix) in the late 1980s, growing the non-profit school's endowment. In 2005, the Malone Family Foundation endowed Catlin Gabel with a $2 million grant for financial aid under its Malone Scholars Program.

== Students ==
As of the 2020–2021 school year, there were 780 students. The student body is divided into three groups: Upper School (grades 9–12), Middle School (grades 6–8), and Beginning and Lower School (preschool–grade 5).

Each year between 2017 and 2020, a Catlin Gabel student was named a U.S. Presidential Scholar, a recognition given each year to 161 high school seniors nationally for their accomplishments.

== Accreditation ==
Catlin Gabel is accredited by the Northwest Association of Independent Schools.

== Student competition activities ==
Catlin Gabel has a long history of science research competition success. Over the years, many students have placed highly in competitions such as the Intel Science Talent Search, the Siemens Competition, the Davidson Fellows Scholarship, and the Intel International Science and Engineering Fair. As of 2023, school review website Niche ranks Catlin Gabel as the number one overall private high school and number one best high school for STEM in the state of Oregon.

Since 2005, Catlin Gabel has operated a team called "The Flaming Chickens". The team competes in the FIRST Robotics Competition as FRC Team 1540 and qualified for the FIRST Championships Competition almost every year since its inception. In 2020, Tiffany Toh, a member of The Flaming Chickens, was named one of ten Dean's List winners at the FIRST Robotics World award ceremony out of more than 90,000 students.

A team of five Catlin Gabel students won the 2019 BPA Regional Science Bowl out of 114 regional teams, a win that sent them to the Department of Energy National Science Bowl in Washington, D.C., later that same year.

Catlin Gabel has been a successful participant in the Oregon Mock Trial competition, and has often gone to the national competition.

Since the founding of its chess club, Catlin's Varsity Chess Team has taken 1st in the Oregon High School Chess Team Association Championships three years in a row.

== Athletics ==
The Catlin Gabel Eagles are one of the most successful small-school athletic programs in Oregon, having claimed 79 state championships since 1974. The Upper School competes in soccer, cross-country, basketball, baseball, track, golf, swimming, skiing, women's volleyball, and tennis. The school also offers a robust Middle School athletics program.

Catlin Gabel's traditional athletic rival is Oregon Episcopal School, which is also based in Portland.

Catlin Gabel School competes as a member of the Lewis & Clark League, which comprises public and private high schools in the Portland metropolitan area, and operates under the supervision of the Oregon Schools Activities Association (OSAA). With around 300 students in grades 9–12, the school was classified by the OSAA for the 2022–23 school year as Class 3A school for most athletic competition purposes, which included schools with an enrollment of 146 to 310 students in that grade range.

=== Boys Soccer ===
Catlin Gabel Boys Soccer program have made 20 appearances in the state championship game and claimed a share of 14 state championships (1988, 1989, 1990, 1991, 1992, 1994, 1995, 2002, 2004, 2010, 2016, 2018, 2019, 2021), which are the 2nd most in Oregon high school state history. In 2016, the boys soccer team was honored by The Oregonian as the 7th best sports team in the state for that calendar year, out-ranking the Oregon Ducks Men's Basketball team and the Portland Thorns professional soccer team.

=== Girls Soccer ===
Girls Soccer is the most successful athletic program at Catlin Gabel. The Eagles girls soccer team became the state's winningest girls soccer program after claiming their 16th state championship in 2023. (1992, '94, '95, '96, '97, '98, '99, 2000, '01, '02, '03, '04, '10, '19, '21)

=== Tennis ===
Both of the school's tennis programs last won state titles in 2022. The Boys Tennis team has claimed 13 state championships (1985, 1996, 1997, 1998, 2000, 2002, 2003, 2004, 2005, 2010, 2022) and have been state runner-up 9 times. The Girls Tennis team has won 6 state titles (1980, 2002, 2003, 2015, 2016, 2022) and have been state finalists 8 times (1996, 2001, 2005, 2006, 2009, 2013, 2014, 2019)

Hedy Jackson, the Boys Head Varsity Tennis coach, is the only coach in Oregon state history to lead both boys and girls programs to state championships, doing so in 2002 and 2003 while coaching both teams concurrently. Jackson has the most state titles of any Oregon head coach in any OSAA sanctioned sport, with 14 in total (12 boys, 2 girls).

=== Swimming ===
The varsity swim teams began in 2013, despite Catlin Gabel's lack of a natatorium. Boys swimming has won 4 4A/3A/2A/1A state titles, the latest in 2025 and winning their first in 2015 with just four swimmers. Girls swimming claimed their first-ever state championship in 2023 and again in 2025.

== Sustainability ==
All grades include an aspect of environmental and social sustainability. Grades one through five student projects include a worm farm and seedling starts for the campus garden. Middle school students research studies on topics including obesity, agribusiness, the global food supply-chain and the carbon footprint of food. The Upper School's PLACE Program (Planning and Leadership Across City Environments) uses urban planning to study sustainability.

Since 2007, the school has instituted food services programs such as switching to washable dinnerware in the cafeteria and sourcing food from local farms within a 150-mile radius. Within one year, the school reduced its landfill contributions by 32.49 tons, and in 2016, after realizing that their recycled plastic was making its way to landfills, two students convinced the school to stop selling bottled water. In 2020, students and community partners removed 25 truckloads of invasive species from 2.5 acres of school property and planted over 2,000 native shrubs and trees.

== School traditions ==
Some of the early traditions at Catlin Gabel included the beginning-of-the-year "Bacon Bat" picnic. Bacon Bat is an event involving games, competitions and a cookout with the intention of building school spirit.

Additionally, in 1931 students first performed the play St. George and the Dragon, a tradition which was recently discontinued in favor of putting on short plays called "Winterlude."

One tradition has been the recitation of the School Chapter, a tradition dating back to 1935 for ninth graders to memorize 1 Corinthians 13 in their English classes.

The school's annual Rummage Sale began during World War II and ran for 65 years, with the first event raising over $8,000. The event grew so large it was eventually moved to the Portland Expo Center. The last event was held in 2009.

== Faculty sexual assault and misconduct allegations ==
Beginning in 2017, several former students began writing about sexual abuse by faculty on social media. Coinciding with the Me Too movement, the number of accounts increased, prompting the school to commission an investigation in October 2019.

The investigation issued a report on November 11, 2019. It found that at least 21 Catlin Gabel faculty had taken advantage of their positions at the school in committing various degrees of sexual impropriety. This ranged from the rape of a 6th grade student to generally inappropriate behavior and relationships between faculty and students that went back as early as the 1960s and was recorded occurring as recently as 2016. In December 2019, the Washington County Sheriff's Department opened a criminal investigation of the school. In January 2020, The Oregonian documented allegations by over 15 former students from age 21 to 61. Six more former students sued the school in April 2020 saying they were fondled, groped, and sexually abused by former teachers Richardson Shoemaker, Robert Ashe, Art Leo and Sam Crawley. A total of 16 former students have filed suit against Catlin Gabel.

== Notable alumni ==
- Megan Amram, 2006, comedian and writer
- David Bragdon, 1977, former president of Metro
- Caroline Burke, 1933, actress, theater producer, and art collector
- John H. Chun, 1987, federal judge
- Gretchen Corbett, 1963, actress
- Winslow Corbett, 1998, film and stage actress
- Kevin M. Esvelt, 2000, biologist at the MIT Media Lab
- Roger Gantz, 1989, Portland Timbers midfielder
- Margaux Hemingway, 1973, model and actress, granddaughter of novelist Ernest Hemingway
- Mayo Methot, 1919, actress and second wife of Humphrey Bogart
- Sadako Ogata, 1946, former United Nations high commissioner for refugees
- Nadya Okamoto, 2016, founder of PERIOD.org, author of Period Power: a Manifesto for the Menstrual Movement, former Chief Brand Officer of JUV Consulting, founder of August.
- Nancy Neighbor Russell, 1944, conservationist and founder of Friends of the Columbia Gorge
- David Shipley, 1981, deputy editorial page editor and op-ed editor at The New York Times
- Olaniyi Sobomehin, 2003, NFL football player
- J. Mary Taylor, 1948, science educator
- Gus Van Sant, 1971, film director
- Charis Wilson, 1932, writer, model for, and wife of photographer Edward Weston
