= Forty Carats =

Play adapted by Jay Presson Allen

- Broadway Playbill with June Allyson
- Written by: Jay Presson Allen
- Genre: Comedy

Premiere
- Date: December 26, 1968
- Place: Morosco Theatre; New York City

Forty Carats is a play by Jay Presson Allen. Adapted from the French original by Pierre Barillet and Jean-Pierre Gredy, the comedy revolves around a 40-year-old American divorcee who is assisted by a 22-year-old when her car breaks down during a vacation in Greece. Their ensuing romantic interlude changes from a brief encounter to a potentially serious relationship when he turns up on her New York City doorstep to take her 17-year-old daughter on a date. Finding the attraction between them still irresistibly strong, she must overcome her resistance to a May–December romance while contending with her mother, ex-husband, and a real estate client who wants to discuss more than business.

After two previews, the Broadway production, directed by Abe Burrows, opened on December 26, 1968, at the Morosco Theatre, where it ran for 780 performances. The opening-night cast included Julie Harris (Ann Stanley), Marco St. John (Peter Latham), Iva Withers (Mrs. Adams), Polly Rowles (Mrs. Margolin), Murray Hamilton (Billy Boylan), Franklin Cover (Eddy Edwards), Glenda Farrell (Maud Hayes), Gretchen Corbett (Trina Stanley), Nancy Marchand (Mrs. Latham), John Cecil Holm (Mr. Latham), and Michael Nouri (Pat).

Julie Harris won the Tony Award for Best Actress in a Play, in the lead role and she was succeeded by June Allyson, Joan Fontaine, and Zsa Zsa Gabor throughout the run.

The 1973 film adaptation starred Liv Ullmann.
