= Jaws of Satan =

1982 film by Bob Claver

- Theatrical poster
- Directed by: Bob Claver
- Screenplay by: Gerry Holland
- Produced by: Bill Wilson
- Starring: Fritz Weaver; Gretchen Corbett; John McCurry
- Cinematography: Dean Cundey
- Edited by: Len Miller
- Music by: Roger Kellaway
- Distributed by: United Artists
- Release date: January 15, 1982
- Running time: 92 minutes
- Country: United States
- Language: English

Jaws of Satan, also called by its working title King Cobra, is a 1982 American horror film directed by Bob Claver, and starring Fritz Weaver, Gretchen Corbett, Jon Korkes, and Christina Applegate, in her feature film debut. Its plot follows a preacher from a cursed family who is forced to battle Satan, who has taken the form of a huge king cobra and is also influencing other regular snakes in the area. The film was released on January 15, 1982.

== Plot ==
A large king cobra escapes during transport and kills two railroad workers before reaching a small town in Alabama. That night, Father Tom Farrow, the town's Catholic priest, is warned by librarian Evelyn Downs that an ancient enemy has come to claim his soul. The next day, two tree loggers are attacked by a rattlesnake, prompting Dr. Maggie Sheridan to call in herpetologist Dr. Paul Hendricks after discovering a body with unusual puncture wounds.

Observed by the Cobra, Maggie encounters a rattlesnake in her home, which Paul kills, and he stays overnight to comfort her. Following Evelyn's death, Farrow learns from his uncle, the Monsignore, that his family has a cursed bloodline linked to violent deaths and strange occurrences every third generation. The Monsignore warns Farrow that if Satan has arrived in the form of a snake, unnatural events will follow.

As the town deals with snake attacks, including the death of a deputy, the Monsignore reveals a family member once defeated a serpent. After the Cobra attacks Farrow, he manages to fend it off with a cross, but the Monsignore dies. During a town meeting, the mayor dismisses the threats and pushes to proceed with a dog race, prompting Maggie and Paul to investigate.

Maggie encounters a mugger, and they both escape an attack by the Cobra. Paul discovers the Cobra's lair and is knocked out. The mayor eventually cancels the dog race after a series of events, including a child being attacked. Maggie finds Paul but is captured by the Cobra.

In the climax, Farrow confronts the Cobra in the caves, offering himself in place of Maggie. He prays, and his cross glows, leading to the Cobra's demise via being engulfed in fire. Farrow, Paul, and Maggie manage to escape the cave alive.

== Cast ==
- Fritz Weaver as Father Tom Farrow
- Gretchen Corbett as Dr. Maggie Sheridan
- Jon Korkes as Dr. Paul Hendricks
- Norman Lloyd as the Monsignore
- Diana Douglas as Evelyn Downs
- Bob Hannah as Matt Perry
- Nancy Priddy as Elizabeth Perry
- Christina Applegate as Kim Perry
- John McCurry as Sheriff George Tatum
- Jack Gordon as Mayor Grady Thorpe
- Allene Simmons as Nurse Peggy
- Mark Daly Richards as Dr Owens
- Virginia Samford as the Senator

== Production ==
The screenplay was written by Gerry Holland from a story by James Callaway. Filming took place in the fall of 1980 in Alabama, in the cities of Tuscaloosa, Demopolis, Eutaw, and Childersburg. The film was shot under the working title King Cobra. Dean Cundey served as cinematographer. The film marked Christina Applegate's feature film debut; she was approximately ten years old during production and played Kim Perry, the daughter of a local businessman.

== Release ==
Jaws of Satan premiered in Birmingham, Alabama, on January 15, 1982.

=== Home media ===
Scream Factory released the film on Blu-ray as a double-feature with Empire of the Ants (1977) in 2015.

=== Critical response ===
Jeffrey Kauffman, writing for Blu-ray.com, opined that "Jaws of Satan is at times a risibly awful motion picture, but it deserves a few bonus points for being one of the oddest mash-ups in horror cinema history, with elements drawn from entries as disparate as Jaws ... and The Exorcist (and, no, that isn't a typo)." Dennis Schwartz of Ozus' World Movie Reviews gave the film a grade of C, calling it "a poor man's derivative of Spielberg's Jaws" and criticizing the screenplay for its plot holes. Bobby Lisse of Morbidly Beautiful argued that the film's supernatural angle undercuts whatever real-world threat the snake premise could have offered, and that it would have worked better under its original title King Cobra as a straightforward animal-attack film.
