= Out of It (1969 film) =

1969 film

- Film poster
- Directed by: Paul Williams
- Written by: Paul Williams
- Produced by: Edward R. Pressman
- Starring: Barry Gordon; Jon Voight; Lada Edmund Jr.
- Cinematography: John G. Avildsen
- Edited by: Ed Orshan
- Music by: Michael Small
- Production companies: Pressman-Williams Enterprises, Inc.
- Distributed by: United Artists
- Release date: December 1969
- Running time: 95 minutes
- Country: United States
- Language: English
- Budget: $350,000

Out of It is a 1969 American comedy-drama film directed by Paul Williams, and starring Barry Gordon, Jon Voight, Lada Edmund Jr., Gretchen Corbett, and Peter Grad. It was entered into the 20th Berlin International Film Festival.

== Plot ==
A brain and a brawn battle for the attentions of a bird in the back seat of a Buick.

== Cast ==
- Barry Gordon as Paul
- Jon Voight as Russ
- Lada Edmund Jr. as Christine
- Gretchen Corbett as Barbara
- Peter Grad as Steve
- Frank Campanella as Coach
- Martin Gray as Draft Board
- Oliver Berry
- Leonard Gelber as Draft Board

== Production ==
The film was made before Voight's breakout performance in Midnight Cowboy but released after.
