= A Father for Brittany =

1998 American television film

- DVD cover
- Genre: Drama
- Written by: Scott Swanton
- Directed by: Alan Metzger
- Starring: Andrew McCarthy; Michael Learned; Shirley Knight
- Music by: James McVay
- Country of origin: United States
- Original language: English

Production
- Executive producers: Joan Barnett; Joseph A. DiPasquale; Jack Grossbart
- Producer: Linda L. Kent
- Cinematography: Geoffrey Erb
- Editor: Pam Malouf-Cundy
- Running time: 91 minutes
- Production companies: Big Street Pictures; Grossbart Barnett Productions

Original release
- Network: CBS
- Release: March 15, 1998

A Father for Brittany (also known as A Change of Heart) is a 1998 American made-for-television drama film and based on a true story. Andrew McCarthy and Teri Polo play a husband and wife who try to adopt a child. The film originally premiered on CBS on March 15, 1998.

== Plot ==
Keith Lussier, a hard-working man, and his wife Kim, a speech therapist, are high school sweethearts unable to conceive. The couple decides to adopt a baby, but Kim is more interested in the idea than Keith. Just before their baby girl arrives from Korea, Kim is diagnosed with uterine cancer. During her struggle to fight it, their new adopted daughter arrives. They name her Brittany. Keith's fears of becoming a father fade away as he gets to know his new daughter.

When Kim dies before the adoption is finalized, Keith loses Brittany because the adoption agency says they do not allow single parent adoptions. Keith goes to court to bring his daughter home and wins. Keith and Brittany are reunited.

== Production ==
It was shot between October and November 1997 in Toronto, Canada, with working titles including The Child in Question and The Keith Lussier Story. At three months old, Brittany was portrayed by sisters Jenny and Hanna Kim, while at 10 months old she was portrayed by Caroline and Catherine Lee.
