= After the Rain (play) =

Play by John Griffith Bowen

- 1967 Broadway playbill cover
- Written by: John Bowen
- Original language: English

Premiere
- Date premiered: 1966
- Place premiered: Hampstead Theatre Club, London

After the Rain is a play by John Griffith Bowen, based on his 1958 novel about a 200-year flood. The action takes place in a university lecture hall two centuries after a massive rainfall.

The play's first English staging was at the Hampstead Theatre in 1966, and was notable for involving the audience in the action of the play by situating them as students in a lecture hall.

Its U.S. premiere on October 9, 1967, at the John Golden Theatre in New York City starred Alec McCowen and was directed by Vivian Matalon. It received a good review in The New York Times but only ran a short time.

The play was profiled in the William Goldman book The Season: A Candid Look at Broadway.

== External ==
- After the Rain at the Internet Broadway Database
