= Lorelei (film) =

2020 American drama film

- Official release poster
- Directed by: Sabrina Doyle
- Written by: Sabrina Doyle
- Produced by: Francesca Silvestri; Kevin Chinoy; Jennifer Radzikowski
- Starring: Pablo Schreiber; Jena Malone; Amelia Borgerding; Parker Pascoe-Sheppard; Chancellor Perry; Gretchen Corbett
- Cinematography: Stephen Paar
- Edited by: Daniel Myers
- Music by: Jeff Russo
- Production companies: Freestyle Picture Company; Visit Films
- Distributed by: Vertical Entertainment
- Release dates: September 9, 2020 (Deauville); July 30, 2021 (United States)
- Running time: 110 minutes
- Country: United States
- Language: English
- Box office: $12,642

Lorelei is a 2020 American drama film written and directed by Sabrina Doyle in her feature directorial debut. It stars Pablo Schreiber, Jena Malone, Amelia Borgerding, Parker Pascoe-Sheppard, Chancellor Perry, and Gretchen Corbett.

Lorelei had its world premiere at the Deauville American Film Festival on September 9, 2020, and was theatrically released in the United States on July 30, 2021.

== Cast ==
- Pablo Schreiber as Wayland
- Jena Malone as Dolores
- Amelia Borgerding as Periwinkle Blue
- Parker Pascoe-Sheppard as Denim Blue
- Chancellor Perry as Dodger Blue
- Gretchen Corbett as Kitty
- Dana Millican as Violet
- Martin Hernandez as Dodger's Friend
- Quinn Liebling as Dodger's Friend #2

== Production ==
In February 2019, it was announced Pablo Schreiber and Jena Malone had joined the cast of the film, with Sabrina Doyle directing from a screenplay she wrote. Filming took place in and around Portland, Oregon.

== Release ==
The film had its world premiere on September 9, 2020 at the Deauville American Film Festival, where a jury presided over by Vanessa Paradis awarded it the Jury Prize. It was previously set to have its world premiere at the Tribeca Film Festival in April 2020, but this was postponed due to the COVID-19 pandemic. The film subsequently got invited back to the 2021 Tribeca Film Festival, screening outdoors in Manhattan as part of the 20th anniversary edition of the festival. During its festival run, Lorelei also picked up Audience and Jury Awards at the International Filmfestival Mannheim-Heidelberg and the Jordan Ressler First Feature Award at the Miami International Film Festival. In March 2021, Vertical Entertainment acquired U.S. distribution rights to the film. It was released on July 30, 2021.
