= Winslow Corbett =

American actress

- Born: 1979 or 1980 (age 45–46); Portland, Oregon, U.S.
- Occupation(s): Film, stage actress
- Years active: 1998–2015
- Mother: Gretchen Corbett

Winslow Corbett (born 1979 or 1980) is an American actress.

== Early years ==
Corbett was born and raised in Portland, Oregon. Her mother is actress Gretchen Corbett. She became enamored with acting as an eighth grade student when she performed in a school production of H.M.S. Pinafore.

== Career ==
Corbett toured as Elaine Robinson in the stage version of The Graduate during the 2000s, as well as touring in several other plays, and appeared in the television film A Change of Heart (1998).

== Filmography ==
=== Television ===
Year	Title	Role	Notes
1998	A Change of Heart	Kelly	Television film
2013–2015	The Digressions	Kenley	13 episodes
2014	Submissions Only	Suzy	Episode: "Having Foresight"
2015	Veep	Reporter	4 episodes
