= Girls Nite Out (1982 film) =

1982 film directed by Robert Deubel

- Theatrical release poster
- Directed by: Robert Deubel
- Screenplay by: Gil Spencer Jr.; Kevin Kurgis; Joe Bolster; Anthony N. Gurvis
- Story by: Gil Spencer Jr.; Kevin Kurgis; Joe Bolster
- Produced by: Anthony N. Gurvis
- Starring: Rutanya Alda; Suzanne Barnes; Lauren-Marie Taylor; Julia Montgomery; James Carroll; Al McGuire; David Holbrook; Hal Holbrook; Mart McChesney
- Cinematography: Joe Rivers
- Edited by: Arthur Ginsberg
- Production company: Concepts Unlimited
- Distributed by: Independent International Pictures; Aries International
- Release date: December 3, 1982 (U.S.)
- Running time: 96 minutes
- Country: United States
- Language: English
- Budget: <$1 million

Girls Nite Out is a 1982 American slasher film directed by Robert Deubel, and starring Julia Montgomery, Suzanne Barnes, Rutanya Alda, Lauren-Marie Taylor, and Hal Holbrook. It focuses on a group of female college students who are targeted by a killer in a bear mascot costume during an all-night scavenger hunt on their Ohio campus.

The film was developed by Anthony N. Gurvis and Kevin Kurgis, two law firm partners in Columbus, Ohio, who completed a screenplay originally titled Blood Games in 1979. After securing Holbrook to appear in the film, principal photography was scheduled to begin on the campus of Denison University in the summer of 1980, but approval to film there was subsequently revoked. Gurvis and Kurgis then decided to relocate the production to New York, where the remainder of casting took place. The film was shot on location at Upsala College in East Orange, New Jersey as well as the Masters School in Dobbs Ferry, New York, over a period of 21 days in early 1982.

Girls Nite Out first received a test market theatrical release in the southern United States on December 3, 1982 under the title The Scaremaker through Samuel M. Sherman's distribution company Independent International Pictures. After the test market release failed to generate significant box office returns, Kurgis formed his own distribution company, Aries International, through which the film was given an expanded released under the better-known Girls Nite Out title. It received largely unfavorable reviews from critics, many of whom derided the film for its incorporation of humor contrasting against its violent content, as well as its expansive ensemble of characters.

== Plot ==
At Weston Hills Sanitarium in rural Ohio, psychiatric patient Dickie Cavanaugh commits suicide by hanging himself. Cavanaugh's sister gives permission to two gravediggers to bury the body. While the two men are digging the hole for Cavanaugh's body, they are attacked and murdered by an unseen killer who throws their corpses into the burial plot.

Meanwhile, at nearby DeWitt University, the basketball team wins a championship game, and as a result, an all-night scavenger hunt will take place the next evening for the female students. Lynn and her boyfriend-star player Teddy Ratliff celebrate the victory at the campus diner, and the waitress Barney is thrilled for the team. Lynn, Teddy, and other students attend a party that evening, where the story of Dickie circulates among freshmen who are unaware of his recent death; they are told that Cavanaugh murdered his girlfriend Patty in a jealous rage and is locked away in the sanitarium. Lynn becomes jealous over Teddy's attraction to Dawn Sorenson and misfit Mike Pryor gets into a fight with his girlfriend Sheila. Soon, school mascot Michael Benson is stabbed in his dorm room after arriving back from the party, and his bear mascot costume is stolen by the killer.

The following day, Mike Pryor is questioned by campus security officer Jim MacVey over the fight with his girlfriend; MacVey's daughter Patty was Dickie Cavanaugh's girlfriend. Later that evening, the campus radio DJ broadcasts the clues to the scavenger hunt, which are received by the girls on their portable radios. Meanwhile, the killer who is dressed in the bear costume, is armed with serrated knives mimicking bear claws.

Jane enters the girls' locker room and locates the first item of the hunt, only to be attacked from behind by the killer, who brutally slashes her throat while calling her misogynistic slurs. Shortly after, Kathy discovers Jane's body crudely strung up in the locker room showers. Kathy tries to flee before also having her throat slashed. The DJ at the radio station begins receiving phone calls from the killer, who tallies his victims; the killer also calls officer MacVey and claims to be Dickie Cavanaugh. Sheila goes down to the pond to search for another item and runs into the bear-clad killer, whom she believes to be Benson. Teasing him, she goes into an abandoned shed by the pond. While inside the shed, the killer smashes their hand through the window, slashing Sheila's throat.

Meanwhile, Lynn continues searching for items on the scavenger hunt, while Teddy visits Dawn at her apartment, where the two have sex. Lynn's friend Leslie goes to search for an item in the attic of the old chapel, where she is murdered and her body is discovered by Lynn. After calling, the police arrive and find all of the bodies, where they are suspicious of Mike Pryor and question several of the students. Dawn gets into an argument with her boyfriend Bud Remington, who kicks her out of their house after he tells her he knows about her affair with Teddy. Officer MacVey studies the phone calls placed to the radio station as well as files and photographs of Dickie Cavanaugh, whose death he became aware of by Dickie's doctor.

While walking home, Dawn senses that someone is following her and has a panic attack. She uses a payphone outside the student union to call Teddy's house, where he is consoling Lynn. The phone call is incomprehensible, and ends with Dawn screaming, followed by a gruff voice invoking Teddy to "come and get her." Lynn calls the police while Teddy flees to the student union. Once there, he finds Dawn bloody and wounded in the cafeteria. As Teddy is comforting her, he is stabbed by Barney, who reveals herself as the killer. Officer MacVey enters the cafeteria and confronts Barney, whom he addresses as Dickie's twin sister, Katie Cavanaugh. Katie, apparently suffering from dissociative identity disorder, responds to MacVey in alternating voices, claiming to be Dickie. After MacVey tells Katie that Dickie is dead, she reverts, and calmly tells him that Dickie is not dead, and that she brought him home from the hospital. She opens the freezer, displaying Dickie's frozen body clothed in a wheelchair and with the bear-claw weapon in his hand.

== Cast ==
- Julia Montgomery as Lynn Connors
- James Carroll as Teddy Ratliff
- Suzanne Barnes as Dawn Sorenson
- Rutanya Alda as Barney/Katie Cavanaugh
- Hal Holbrook as Jim MacVey
- Al McGuire as Coach Kimble
- Lauren-Marie Taylor as Sheila Robinson
- David Holbrook as Mike Pryor
- Laura Summer as Jane
- Mart McChesney as Pete 'Maniac' Krizaniac
- Carrick Glenn as Kathy
- John Didrichsen as Ralph Bostwick
- Lois Robbins as Leslie Peterson
- Mathew Dunn as Michael Benson
- Susan Pitts as Trish
- Gregory Salata as Hagen
- Tony Shultz as Bud Remington
- Larry Mintz as Charlie Kaiser
- Richard Bright as Detective Greenspan
- Kevin Mulvey as Sergeant Parker
- Richard Voigts as Dean Kemper (as Richard Voights)
- Page Moseley as Pledge One
- Paul Christie as Dancer

== Production ==
=== Development ===
Executive producers Anthony N. Gurvis and Kevin Kurgis, two law firm partners in Columbus, Ohio, had aspired to break into the film business, developing a horror film screenplay titled Blood Games in 1979. After approaching a film professor at their alma mater, Denison University, they received approval to shoot the film on location at the university. Kurgis then approached actor Hal Holbrook after one of his Mark Twain Tonight! one-man shows at Columbus's Mershon Auditorium, leaving the film's screenplay for Holbrook with the hope that he would accept a role in the film. Holbrook, who had recently completed John Carpenter's The Fog (1980), obliged, and the producers also gave Holbrook's son, David, a part in the film. Filming was scheduled to begin on the Denison University campus in the summer of 1980, but was stalled after a trustee at the university objected to the production, after which their approval was ultimately withdrawn.

The film's title was subsequently altered from Blood Games to The Fatal Clue, after which Gurvis and Kurgis partnered with Concepts Unlimited, an entertainment firm and production house in New York. Robert Deubel, an associate of Concepts Unlimited, was then enlisted as director.

=== Casting ===
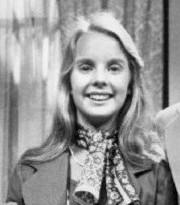
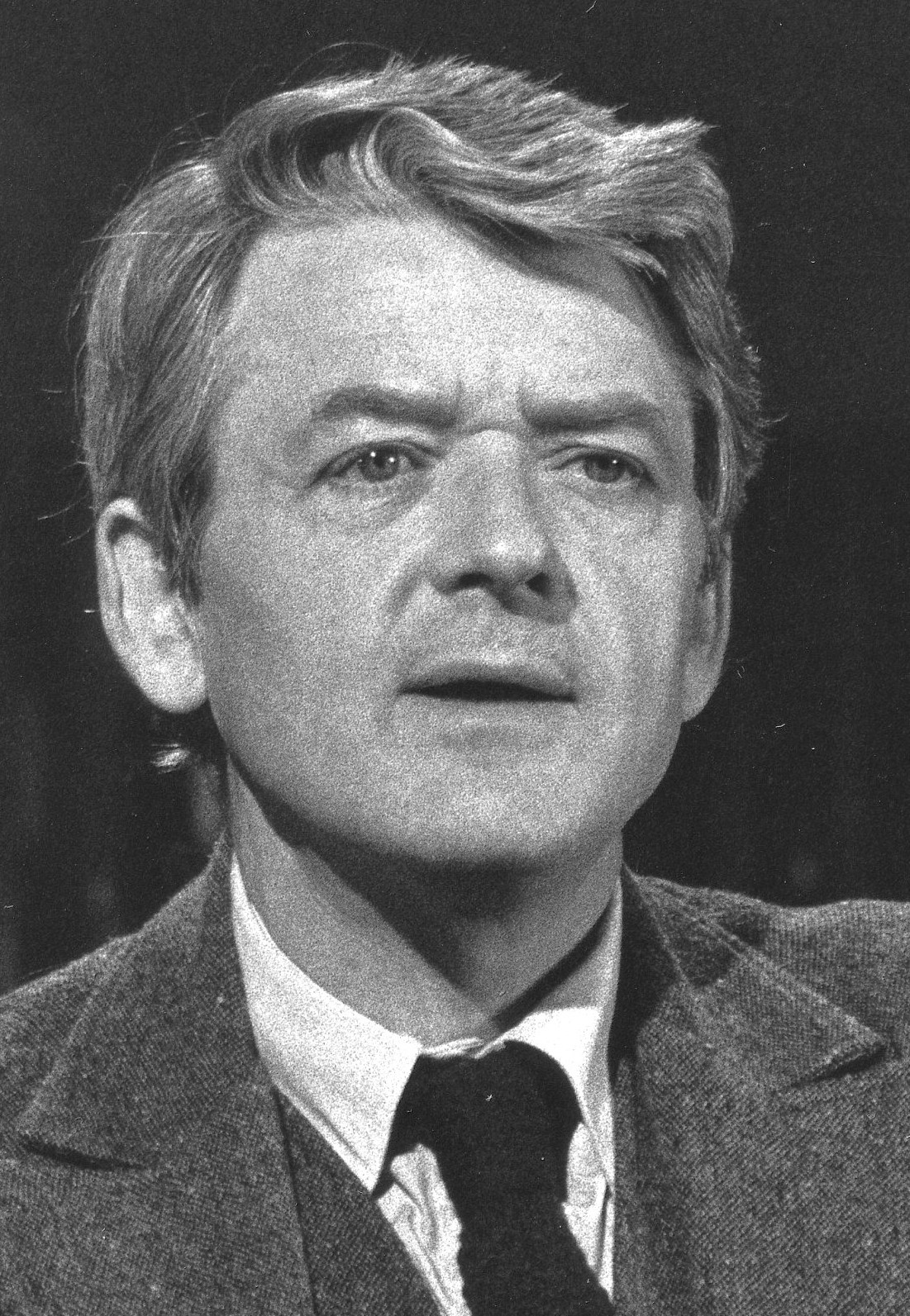
Julia Montgomery and Hal Holbrook have central roles in the film

With Hal Holbrook already cast in the film, the production began casting its younger performers out of New York City. Julia Montgomery, a series regular on the soap opera One Life to Live was given a lead role as Lynn Connors. Rutanya Alda was cast in the small but central role of Barney, the cafeteria server, and Alda's husband Richard Bright was given a minor part as Detective Greenspan.

Several of the younger actors cast in the ensemble already had experience appearing in other regional horror films: Carrick Glen had recently completed The Burning (1981); James Carroll had appeared in He Knows You're Alone (1980); and Suzanne Barnes had a supporting role in The Children (1980). Lauren-Marie Taylor, who was cast in a main supporting role as Sheila Robinson, had previously had a supporting role in Friday the 13th Part 2 (1981), and at the time of her casting, had just finished wrapping the comedy Neighbors (1981). Taylor met castmate John Didrichsen while shooting Girls Nite Out, and the couple were married the year after filming completed.

=== Filming ===
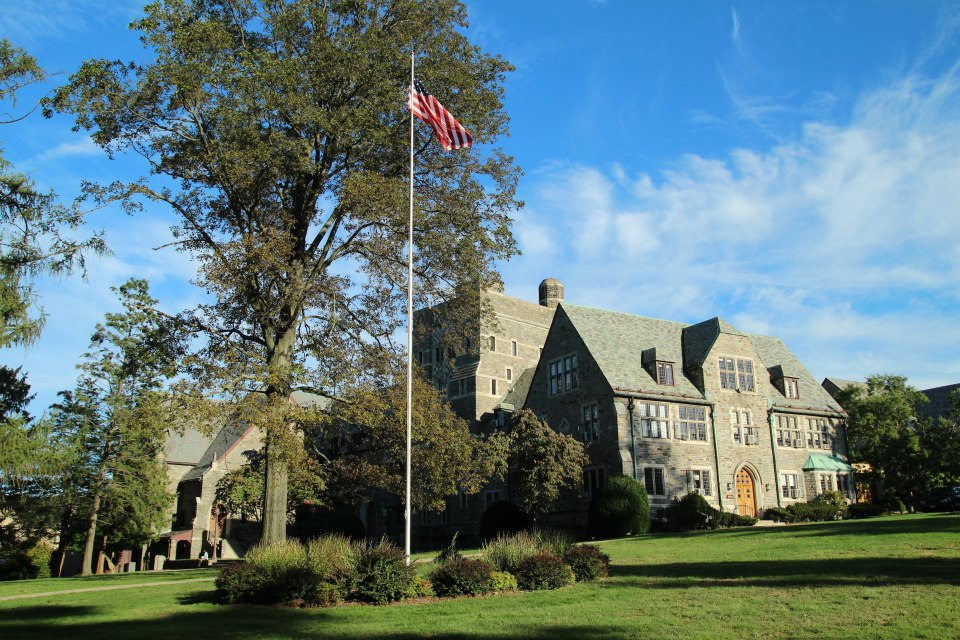
Part of the film was shot on the campus of the Masters School

Girls Nite Out was shot in early 1982 at the Masters School in Dobbs Ferry, New York, and at Upsala College in East Orange, New Jersey, on a budget of less than $1 million. Principal photography lasted 21 days. Director Robert Deubel had previously worked as a documentarian.

According to actress Rutanya Alda, her shooting schedule only lasted three days, and most of her scenes were shot in one to two takes. Because the film was shot on operating campuses, the filmmakers were forced to shoot over weekends; the shoots began on a Friday and concluded on a Sunday, meaning the cast and crew had to work for twenty-four-hour intervals. Alda stated that the final shot of the film in which Dickie's corpse is revealed freezer (which Alda herself played) was shot after the principal shoot. In a 2013 interview, Alda claimed that the producers of the film still owed her $5,000 for her work that they never paid her for.

=== Post-production ===
After principal photography was completed, producers Gurvis and Kurgis sold distribution rights to the film to Independent International Pictures, a company that specialized in grindhouse, exploitation, and B-horror films. Samuel M. Sherman, the head of the company, requested that the filmmakers change the title from The Last Clue to The Scaremaker, as well as incorporate additional horror elements into the film's first act, as there was no onscreen violence until approximately midway through the film. At Sherman's suggestion, additional footage of the gravediggers being killed while digging Dickie Cavanaugh's gravesite was filmed at night in Central Park. Sherman recalled: "I don't remember if I had anything to do with the writing and planning of these new scenes... I went there one night. It was pretty dark, the area they had chosen, and the crew was digging up a big section of ground... I don't know if the city approved that or not, but they dug it up anyway!"

== Soundtrack ==
Though an official soundtrack was never released, the film exclusively features various oldies and doo-wop hits:

- "Summer in the City" by The Lovin' Spoonful
- "Do You Believe in Magic by The Lovin' Spoonful
- "You Didn't Have to Be So Nice" by The Lovin' Spoonful
- "Didn't Wanna Have to Do It" by The Lovin' Spoonful
- "Yummy Yummy Yummy by Ohio Express
- "Quick Joey Small (Run Joey Run)" by Kasenetz-Katz Singing Orchestral Circus
- "Indian Giver" by 1910 Fruit Gum Company
- "1, 2, 3, Red Light" by 1910 Fruit Gum Company
- "Down at Lulu's" by Ohio Express
- "Hanky Panky" by Tommy James and the Shondells
- "Do Something to Me" by Tommy James and the Shondells
- "I'm Alive" by Tommy James and the Shondells
- "Darling, How Long" by The Heartbeats
- "Judy in Disguise" by John Fred and His Playboy Band

== Release ==
The film first received a test market theatrical release through Clark Releasing under the title The Scaremaker on December 3, 1982 at 35 theaters and drive-ins in southern United States. Among the cities in which it showed include Little Rock and Jonesboro, Arkansas, as well as Memphis and Jackson, Tennessee; and Clarksville, Mississippi. The film continued to screen regionally under this title through early 1983, as a double bill with Blood Beach.

Following a financially unsuccessful test market release, "the producers took the picture back, and I heard nothing about it for some time," said Independent International Pictures head Samuel M. Sherman. In late 1983, the film was re-released under the title Girls Nite Out, distributed by Aries International, an independent film distribution company formed by Kurgis. It opened under this title in Detroit, Michigan on October 8, 1983 as part of a double bill with Pieces (1982). In the United Kingdom and Ireland, the film was released in December 1986, with twenty-two seconds excised from the original cut.

=== Marketing ===
The film's marketing campaign under the Girls Nite Out emphasized images of scantily-clad women, with a sensational tagline on one poster reading: "You know what really turned her on... She loved to be scared; weird and kinky things really got her motor running" along with a sub-tagline reading: "Don't bring your girlfriend to this film. She may never go out again." Film historian William Schoell described the film's advertising campaign as "blatant and sleazy," but noted that, despite its salacious marketing, the film itself does not feature any such sexual violence. Another alternate poster for the film shows three women running in terror.

=== Home media ===
Thorn EMI released Girls Nite Out on VHS in the United States in the mid-1980s, and was released in the United Kingdom by AVR home entertainment and other European territories under The Scaremaker title. In Sweden, the growling bear displayed in the artwork for the film Grizzly (1976) was repurposed for the film's VHS release to represent the bear-suited killer.

The film was released for the first time on DVD by Media Blasters on August 30, 2005, as part of the company's "Slasher Collection" series. The release features an interview with actress Julia Montgomery, as well as the film's theatrical trailer and original opening titles bearing the film's original title of The Scaremaker.

==== 2022 restoration ====
Arrow Video released the film for the first time on Blu-ray in the United Kingdom and North America on May 16 and May 22, 2022, respectively. The release was sourced from a number of 35 mm release prints from the producers' personal vaults, as the original pre-print materials could not be located. The materials were given a 2K scan and underwent digital restoration, though a few "very brief" sections missing from the source materials were sourced from a standard definition tape master. Despite the restoration efforts, Arrow noted that "some obvious signs of picture wear remain, due to the poor state of the materials available." The soundtrack featured on the release was sourced from the 35mm optical track and restored using Pro Tools.

The Blu-ray packaging was made available with both a standard edition slipcover and a limited edition with a slipcover bearing the alternate artwork and title as The Scaremaker.

== Reception ==
=== Box office ===
During the film's test market run in late 1983 under the title The Scaremaker, the film, according to studio head Samuel M. Sherman, "didn't do any business. And I guess the producers put the responsibility on my head and my company's head, for not making it commercial." Sherman partly attributed the lack of box office income to the fact that, at the time, many drive-in theaters were being bought out by commercial businesses who wanted to utilize their land.

=== Critical response ===
Variety described the film as "a routine slasher picture, offering little entertainment..." Scott Cain of The Atlanta Constitution wrote that the film "has all the predictable ingredients... There must be 50 supporting roles and, as a consequence, none of the characters has much chance to make a favorable impression." John Douglas of The Grand Rapids Press panned the film, criticizing its comedic relief and noting that the large cast and characters seemed indistinguishable, summarizing it as "[just] another cut and slash film."

Mike Hughes of the Hattiesburg American wrote: "By horror standards, it's almost adequate... Where they failed—thoroughly—was in their frequent passes at campus humor... Where they succeeded was in filming the story smoothly and giving it a solid cast." Writing for The Californian, critic Mike Hughes gave the film a middling review, noting that "by horror standards, it's almost adequate," but also criticized the screenplay's attempts at college humor.

=== Modern assessment ===
There have been numerous retrospective reviews of the film published since its initial release. In a 1998 review, the Blockbuster Entertainment Guide to Movies and Videos awarded the film two out of four stars. Online movie guide AllMovie awarded the film two out of five stars, writing: "Girls Nite Out might be one of the most forgettable of the early '80s slashers", calling it "dull" and "routine". Bill Gibron, writing for DVD Talk in 2005, called the film a "poor excuse for entertainment holds the grand distinction of hosting two members of the Holbrook family (Hal and son David) as part of its cast," also criticizing the lack of variety among the murder scenes, and adding: "In the end, when the slayer is revealed, we rest easier knowing that it takes a certain strangled mindset to turn serial killer and that we are safe—at least for now. Girls Nite Out offers none of this nuance. Instead, we get boredom on top of balderdash, never a good fright night combination."

Film scholar John Stanley awarded the film two-and-a-half out of four stars, writing: "This imitation of Friday the 13th (originally shot as The Scaremaker) is strengthened only by the presence of Hal Holbrook as a campus security chief." Steven Scheuer in Movies on TV '88-'89 referred to the film as "bloody and borderline offensive" and deemed the villain's costume "simply laughable," ultimately giving the film a one-star rating. Critic James J. Mulay gave the film zero stars in The Horror Film: A Guide to More Than 700 Films on Videocassette (1989), noting the film's surprise ending but that it overall "scarcely succeeds," also criticizing the film's actors, who he deemed "old enough to be teaching higher education." The American Genre Film Archive, a home media and film restoration organization, described Girls Nite Out as "a surreal and outrageous party slasher from the era's golden age."

In a 2021 retrospective of Hal Holbrook's career, Rob Hunter of /Film wrote: "It's no lost slasher classic, but there's fun to be had as the killer tapes steak knives onto his bear paw to simulate claws and the youths party on like they're going to live forever. Heads up fools, you're not! The film takes good advantage of the campus landscape finding dark hallways and shadow-filled trails between buildings, and while too many of the students are interchangeable–seriously, kudos to you if you can tell these guys and gals apart–they do solid enough work shaping their characters before being sliced and diced."

== Sources ==
- Albright, Brian (2012). Regional Horror Films, 1958-1990: A State-by-State Guide with Interviews. McFarland. ISBN 978-0-786-47227-7.
- Aros, Andrew A.; Dimmitt, Richard Bertrand (1986). A Title Guide to the Talkies, 1975 through 1984. Lanham, Maryland: Scarecrow Press. ISBN 978-0-810-81868-2.
- Blockbuster Entertainment Guide to Movies and Videos, 1998. New York City, New York: Island Books. 1997. ISBN 978-0-440-22419-8.
- Cant, Ewen (2022). Girls Nite Out: About the Restoration, Production Credits, Special Thanks (Liner notes booklet). Arrow Films. pp. 22–23. OCLC 1315488931.
- Gingold, Michael (2022). Can You Bear It? The Story of Girls Nite Out (Liner notes booklet). Arrow Films. pp. 7–21. OCLC 1315488931.
- Harper, Jim (2004). Legacy of Blood: A Comprehensive Guide to Slasher Movies. Manchester, England: Critical Vision. ISBN 978-1-900-48639-2.
- Henson, Joseph; Kerswell, Justin, et al. (hosts); Alda, Rutanya (interviewee) (April 21, 2013). "Girls Nite Out". The Hysteria Continues (Podcast). No. 57. iTunes.
- Mulay, James J. (1989). The Horror Film: A Guide to More Than 700 Films on Videocassette. Evanston, Illinois: CineBooks. ISBN 978-0-933-99723-3.
- Nowlan, Robert A.; Nowlan, Gregory (1991). The Films of the Eighties: A Complete, Qualitative Filmography to Over 3400 Feature-length English Language Films, Theatrical and Video-only, Released Between January 1, 1980, and December 31, 1989. Vol. 1. Jefferson, North Carolina: McFarland. ISBN 978-0-899-50560-2.
- Scheuer, Steven H. (1987). Movies on TV '88-'89. New York City, New York: Bantam Books. ISBN 978-0-553-26851-5.
- Schoell, William (1988). Stay Out of the Shower: The Shocker Film Phenomenon. London, England: Robinson Publishing. ISBN 978-0-948-16479-8.
- Stanley, John (2000). Creature Features: The Science Fiction, Fantasy, and Horror Movie Guide. Berkley Boulevard Books. ISBN 978-0-425-17517-0.
- Willis, Donald C. (1997). Horror and Science Fiction Films IV. Lanham, Maryland: Scarecrow Press. ISBN 978-0-810-83055-4.
