= May Heatherly =

American actress (1942–2015)

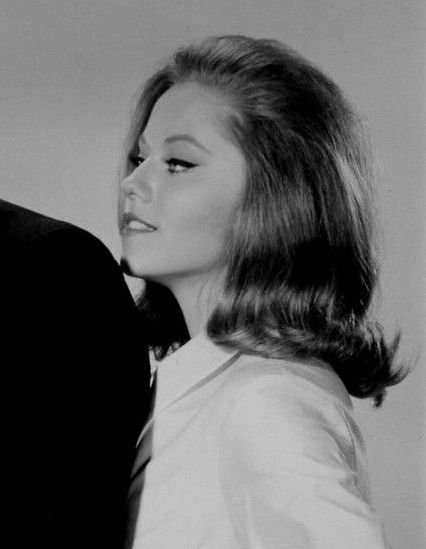
- Heatherly in 1964
- Born: Mary Gay Prindle; May 13, 1942; Los Angeles, California, U.S.
- Died: October 6, 2015 (aged 73); Madrid, Spain
- Occupation: Actress
- Years active: 1961–2015

May Heatherly (born Mary Gay Prindle; May 13, 1942 – October 6, 2015) was an American actress who worked primarily in Spain. A native of Los Angeles, California, Heatherly spent her childhood there before relocating with her family to Spain. After working as an actress in Spain, she went on to appear in some U.S. television, including a recurring guest role on The Man from U.N.C.L.E. (1964). Her film credits include The Cups of San Sebastian (1967), Open Season (1974), From Hell to Victory (1979), Pieces (1982), and Edge of the Axe (1988).

In addition to her acting career, Heatherly also trained in bullfighting in the 1960s, and at one time considered making a career in it. She died in Madrid in October 2015, aged 73.

== Early life ==
Heatherly was born Mary Gay Prindle on May 13, 1942, in Los Angeles, California. When she was eleven years old, she relocated with her family to Spain, where her businessman father took a job opportunity.

== Career ==
In the early 1960s, Heatherly began working in Spain as an actress, appearing in the films Ella y el miedo (1962), Los muertos no perdonan (1963), and Torrejón City (1964). During this period in Spain, Heatherly also trained to be a bullfighter, and considered making a career of it. Heatherly returned to the United States in later 1964 to appear in a recurring guest role as Heather McNabb on The Man from U.N.C.L.E..

She subsequently appeared in the Spanish-based production The Cups of San Sebastian (1967) alongside Tab Hunter, followed by a small role in the American drama film Love and Pain and the Whole Damn Thing (1973) directed by Alan J. Pakula and starring Maggie Smith. Heatherly also had roles in the European-based thrillers The Killer Is One of 13 (1973) and The Student Connection (1974), followed by Open Season (1974), which starred Peter Fonda and William Holden.

After appearing in a number of Spanish-based productions, Heatherly was cast in José Ramón Larraz's slasher film Pieces (1982), portraying the overbearing, abusive mother of the film's killer villain. She subsequently had a supporting role in the drama Crystal Heart (1986), starring Tawny Kitaen. She later reunited with director José Ramón Larraz, appearing in his 1988 slasher film Edge of the Axe.

In 2006, Heatherly has a minor part in the Miloš Forman-directed drama Goya's Ghosts.

== Death ==
Heatherly underwent a hip replacement surgery in 2013. She died two years later on October 6, 2015, in Madrid, aged 73.

== Selected filmography ==
=== Film ===
| Year | Title | Role | Notes | Ref. |
|---|---|---|---|---|
| 1962 | Torrejón City | Ruth | | |
| 1963 | The Dead Don't Forgive | Marta | Spanish title: Los muertos no perdonan | |
| 1964 | Edge of Fear | Laura Berke | Spanish title: Ella y el miedo | |
| 1967 | The Cups of San Sebastian | Jane | Spanish title: El dedo del destino | |
| 1973 | Love and Pain and the Whole Damn Thing | Melanie Elbertson | | |
| 1974 | The Student Connection | Marina | Spanish title: Un par de zapatos del '32 | |
| 1974 | Open Season | Alicia Rennick | | |
| 1975 | Blood Stains in a New Car | María Rovira | Spanish title: Manchas de sangre en un coche nuevo | |
| 1976 | Ambitious | Margarita | Spanish title: Ambiciosa | |
| 1979 | From Hell to Victory | WAAF Lt. Mary Jennings | | |
| 1980 | Cannibals in the Streets | Nurse Helen | | |
| 1982 | Pieces | Mrs. Reston | Spanish title: Mil gritos tiene la noche | |
| 1986 | Crystal Heart | Diana Newley | | |
| 1987 | Beaks: The Movie | Olivia | | |
| 1989 | Edge of the Axe | Anna Bixby | Spanish title: Al filo del hacha | |
| 1999 | The Long Kill | Mrs. Preble | Television film | |
| 2000 | One of the Hollywood Ten | Thug's Wife | | |
| 2005 | The Feast of the Goat | Nurse | | |
| 2006 | Goya's Ghosts | Harlot's Dueña | | |
| 2015 | Vampyres | Woman | | |

=== Television ===
| Year | Title | Role | Notes | Ref. |
|---|---|---|---|---|
| 1961 | Hawaiian Eye | Julie Talbot | Episode: "The Stanhope Brand" | |
| 1961 | My Three Sons | Mary Hawkins | Episode: "The Lostling" | |
| 1961 | The Tom Ewell Show | Diane | Episode: "The Prying Eye" | |
| 1961–1962 | The Real McCoys | Maxine / Barbara | 2 episodes | |
| 1962 | Gunsmoke | Molly | Episode: "The Boys" | |
| 1964 | The Man from U.N.C.L.E. | Heather McNabb | 4 episodes | |
| 1977 | Curro Jiménez | Leonor | Episode: "El míster" | |
| 1991 | Farmacia de guardia | Maggie | Episode: "La novia del abuelo" | |
| 1996 | Médico de familia | Vera | Episode: "Los Martín conquistan Manhattan" | |

== Sources ==
- Senn, Bryan (2013). The Most Dangerous Cinema: People Hunting People on Film. Jefferson, North Carolina: McFarland. ISBN 978-1-476-61357-4.
- Stine, Scott Aaron (2015) [2003]. The Gorehound's Guide to Splatter Films of the 1980s. Jefferson, North Carolina: McFarland. ISBN 9781476611327.
