= Smoke Rise =

Smoke Rise may refer to:

- Smoke Rise, Alabama, location in Blount County, Alabama, USA
- Smoke Rise (band), American progressive rock band
- Smoke Rise (community), gated community in Kinnelon, New Jersey, USA
- Smoke Rise, Georgia, a suburb of Atlanta, GA
