= The Survival of St. Joan =

- A Medieval Rock Opera
- Poster for the 1971 Anderson Theatre production art by David Edward Byrd
- Music: Gary Ruffin; Hank Ruffin
- Lyrics: James Lineberger
- Book: James Lineberger
- Productions: 1970 Buffalo, New York; 1971 Off-Broadway

The Survival of St. Joan is a rock opera by Smoke Rise (Gary Ruffin, Hank Ruffin, Stan Ruffin, and Randy Bugg — music composed by Hank and Gary) from an original concept and libretto by Off-Broadway playwright and screenwriter James Lineberger.

== Performances ==
An initial concert version that ran eight performances was at The Playwrights Unit. Lineberger's fully scripted musical play with spoken dialogue, directed by Chuck Gnys, was next produced at the Studio Arena Theatre in Buffalo, New York, November 5–29, 1970. Facing a taxi strike and the dubious support of the local Hells Angels, which adopted Joan as their warrior princess, the production then had 16 performances Off-off-Broadway at the Anderson Theatre, directed by Gnys and produced by Haila Stoddard and Neal Du Brock, with a cast that included Gretchen Corbett, F. Murray Abraham, Richard Bright, and Janet Sarno. Smoke Rise performed all the singing, while the actors handled the dialogue. It was then issued by Smoke Rise as a concept 2-record set album on Paramount Records (PAS-9000) produced by Stephen Schwartz and Dave Blume in mid 1971.

== Plot ==
The plot of The Survival of St. Joan was possibly inspired by Operation Shepherdess: The Mystery of Joan of Arc by André Guérin and Jack Palmer White, a revisionist history alleging that Joan of Arc escaped execution and later married a nobleman named Robert des Armoises. An idea rejected by historians, the notion of a legendary Joan who lived on in secret has persisted. Certainly inspired by the Vietnam War, the opera tells of the government of France and Pierre Cauchon, Archbishop of Beauvais, releasing Joan of Arc and allowing a double, also believed to be a witch, to burn in her place. She is sent to live with a mute farmer, who falls in love with her, as he elucidates in songs performed in soliloquy toward the audience. Realizing that there is no end in sight to the Hundred Years' War, the first act ends with Joan seeking to rejoin the army, despite the fact that she is no longer hearing her voices.

In Act II, Joan learns that she has lost the respect of the army, who attempt to rape her. (The libretto in the concept album has Joan raped about halfway through the act; this was changed when stagings went beyond a band performance to a full-fledged play.) She meets with some deserters who no longer understand the meaning of the war, and reject its former religious purposes, complaining that only their generals and the nobility can live above suffering. Alone and anonymous, Joan is eventually found by villagers who mistakenly decide she has put a hex on their cow, tie her to a tree and immolate her, thus ending her life almost as history would have it. Upon her death, Joan re-establishes contact with her three voices, St. Michael, St. Catherine, and St. Margaret.

The play script is held in the North Carolina Collection at the University of North Carolina at Chapel Hill, and remains unpublished. It contains many scene changes, often depicting how ordinary people's lives are affected by the war, including Joan's brother, Charles — acting as a scribe for his mother — requesting the king to provide them Joan's soldier's wages to live on, and chiding her for some irate informalisms she wants to include in the letter.

== Songs ==
Act I

- Survival (Hank)
- Someone is Dying (Gary)
- Run, Run (Gary) — The Voices
- Back in the World (Gary) — Joan
- I'm Here (Gary) — Joan
- Love Me (Gary) — Joan
- Stonefire (Gary) — The Farmer
- Love Me (Part 2) (Gary) — The Farmer; The Child
- Lady of Light (Hank) — The Farmer
- Country Life (Hank) — The Farmer
- Run, Run (Part 2) (Gary) — The Voices
- Precious Mommy (Gary) — The Farmer; The Child

Act II

- Medley (Survival, Run Run; Back in the World) — The Voices, Joan
- Lonely Neighbors (Gary) — People on the Road
- Cornbread (Hank) — Soldiers
- This Is How It Is (Hank) — Joan
- Cannonfire (Gary) — A Wounded Deserter
- It's Over (Hank) — Joan, The Voices
- Darkwoods Lullaby (Hank) — The Voices
- You Don't Know Why (Hank) — The Voices
- Propitius (Gary) — Penitents
- Burning a Witch (Gary) — Penitents
- Love Me (Part 3) (Gary) — Joan in Heaven

Additional Songs for the Expanded Version

- Living with the Devil — Witches
- Her Strength in Battle — Court Poet
- Hymn to the Warrior Saint — Court Poet
- Army Life — Soldiers

Stephen Schwartz worked on an unused song for the expansion called "I'll Call Her Barbara" (The Shepherd).

The album featured a cover painting by Doug Jamieson.

== Dramatis Personae ==
(in order of appearance)

- The Voices
- Witches (3)
- Pierre Cauchon, The Bishop of Beauvais
- Jeanne d'Arc (Joan of Arc)
- Monks
- Young Witch
- Jailer
- Friar
- Townspeople
- Child
- Mother
- The Shepherd (formerly known as "The Farmer" on the album libretto)
- An English Soldier
- Swineherd
- Barmaid
- Farmer
- Wife
- Boy
- Colonel
- Court Poet
- Girl
- Mme. d'Arc (Joan's mother)
- Charles d'Arc (Joan's brother)
- Three Fishermen
- Soldier
- Corporal
- Whore
- General
- Soldiers and Whores
- John de Stogumber, a blind man
- His Servant
- Villagers
- Woman
- Phillippe, her son
- Passerby
- Scribe
- Deserter
- Leper Woman
- Leprous Thieves
- Fortune Teller
- Hunters
- Four Nuns
- Clerk
- Abbot
- Man
- The Accuser
- Penitents

== Original Casts ==
=== Studio Arena Theatre, Buffalo, November 1970 ===
- F. Murray Abraham — First Friar, Swineherd, Physician, Corporal, Philippe, Friar with Penitents
- Bill Braden — Bishop's Monk, Soldier, Leper, Penitent
- Mary Carter — Fourth Witch, Barmaid, Whore, Philippe's Mother, First Nun
- Tom Carter — Prison Monk, Soldier, Penitent, Leper
- John A. Coe — Jailer, Farmhand, English Soldier, Bishop
- Gretchen Corbett — Joan
- Patrick Ford — Child with Mother, Farmer's Child
- Judith Granite — Second Witch, Farmhand's Wife, Whore, Joan's Mother, Fortune Teller, Penitent
- Peter Lazer — Hanged Soldier, Deserter, Young Monk, Penitent, Leper
- Richard Bright — Farmer
- Mac McMack — Third Witch, Poet, Soldier, Joan's Brother, Penitent
- George Penrecost — Bishop, Colobel, Lieutenant, Man
- Janet Sarno — First Witch, Mother with Child, Court Lady, Whore, Nun, Penitent, Leper Woman
- Julia Willis — Young Witch, Court Lady, Girl with English Soldier, Whore, Villager

=== Anderson Theatre, New York, February 1971 ===
- F. Murray Abraham — Prison Monk, Friar I, Swineherd, Corporal, Philippe, Soldier, Accuser
- Willie Rook — Beggar Boy, Child, Passer-by, Leper, Villager
- Lenny Baker — Jailer, English Soldier, Son, Soldier, Philippe, Leper, Monk with Lantern, Hunter, Penitent, Clerk
- Ronald Bishop — Bishop, Soldier, Servant, Nun, Villager
- Richard Bright — Farmer
- Gretchen Corbett — Joan
- Elizabeth Eis — Young Witch, Whore, Passer-by, Nun, Villager
- Louis Galterio (replaced with Bill Braden) — Prison Monk, Poet, Another Soldier, Passer-by, Soldier, Monk with Lantern, Hunter, Man
- Judith Granite — Country Witch, Wife, Joan's Mother, Whore #1, Passer-by, Fortune Teller, Penitent (also Mother)
- Peter Lazer — Prison Monk, Soldier, Passer-by, Deserter, Leper, Monk with Lantern, Hunter, Penitent
- Anthony Marciona — Beggar Boy, Boy
- Patricia O'Connell — Mother (replaced with Judith Granite), Whore, Passer-by, First Nun, Villager, Phillippe's Mother (2nd)
- Janet Sarno — Crazed Witch, Whore #3, Passer-by, Leper Woman, Nun, Penitent
- Tom Sawyer — Friar II, Farmer, Soldier, Blind Man, Passer-by, Monk with Lantern
- Matthew Tobin — Scribe, Colonel, Soldier, Monk with Lantern, Hunter, Penitent
- Sasha von Scherler — Clever Witch, Barmaid, Whore #2, Philippe's Mother (1st), Villager
- Steve Reinhardt — Standby for Smoke Rise
