= Margaret Modlin =

American painter

Margaret Marley Modlin
- Publicity Photo of Margaret Modlin
- Born: Margaret Marley; January 5, 1927; Robeson County, North Carolina, U.S.
- Died: October 28, 1998 (aged 71); Madrid, Spain
- Resting place: Buen Retiro Park, Madrid, Spain
- Education: University of North Carolina
- Known for: Painting, Drawing, Photography, Sculpture
- Movement: Mesianism, Surrealism

Margaret Marley Modlin (January 5, 1927 – October 28, 1998) was an American surrealist painter, sculptor and photographer who spent most of her adult life in Spain.

== Biography ==
Margaret Marley was born in Robeson County, North Carolina. Elmer Modlin and Margaret Marley were married in North Carolina in 1949 then moved to Hollywood to find their fortune. They had one son, Nelson, who was born in 1952. Elmer Modlin appeared in TV show Bewitched and the 1968 film, Rosemary's Baby. They left the United States in 1972 to seek better prospects, arriving in Madrid, Spain, in 1975. Margaret Modlin is credited with acting parts in the 1973 film Love and Pain and the Whole Damn Thing and the 1977 film, March or Die.

== Artistic career ==
Modlin stayed at home creating her artworks while her husband and son found paid work. The household, in a house on Calle de Pez, revolved around Margaret the "eccentric painter". The artist used her son and her husband like models to create surrealist scenes about the Apocalypse with a Mesianism message. Modlin's paintings and drawings have been exhibited in California, New York City, Italy and Spain. In 1972, she exhibited at Galeria de Luis in Madrid, Spain, and, in 1978, at the Círculo de Bellas Artes, the first foreigner invited to exhibit.

Modlin didn't sell a painting in her lifetime but hoped to find a place in art history. She died in 1998, stipulating in her will that her paintings remained in Spain. Her final painting, of poet José García Nieto, was only half completed.

== Los Modlin ==
After the death of her son Nelson in 2002 and her husband Elmer Modlin in 2003, Margaret Modlin's 120 paintings and personal effects remained in their dilapidated building, which the El País newspaper described as "a house-museum full of cracks and illuminated only by the colorful paintings." In June 2003 photographs, family movies and personal items about Modlin family were discovered in the street and Spanish photographer Paco Gómez began to piece together the story. In November 2013 he published a book, Los Modlin, based on the subsequent investigation about the family.
