= Elmer Modlin =

American actor (1925–2003)

- Elmer Modlin in Bewitched 1969
- Born: Elmer Nelson Modlin; January 23, 1925; Belhaven, North Carolina, U.S.
- Died: May 6, 2003 (aged 78); Madrid, Spain
- Other name: Elmer Modling
- Occupation: Actor
- Years active: 1965-1990 (film & TV)

Elmer Nelson Modlin (January 23, 1925 – May 6, 2003) was an American film and television actor. He settled in Europe, working frequently in Spain. He was married to the artist Margaret Modlin. He is sometimes credited as Elmer Modling.

== Selected filmography ==
- Rosemary's Baby (1968) - Young Man in Castevet apartment (uncredited)
- The Christian Licorice Store (1971) - Last Party Guest
- The Rebellious Novice (1971) - Martínez (uncredited)
- Love and Pain and the Whole Damn Thing (1973) - Dr. Edelheidt
- Un curita cañón (1974) - Reverendo Barley
- Una mujer prohibida (1974)
- The New Spaniards (1974) - Richard J. Foster
- Duerme, duerme, mi amor (1975) - Ligón extranjero (uncredited)
- Zorrita Martinez (1975) - Americano
- La querida (1976) - Invitado de la fiesta (uncredited)
- Ellas los prefieren... locas (1976)
- El diputado (1978)
- Venus de fuego (1978)
- Los energéticos (1979) - Ramiro
- La mujer del ministro (1981) - Espía (uncredited)
- El Crack (1981) - New Yorker (uncredited)
- Vatican Conspiracy (1982)
- Black Venus (1983) - French Minister (uncredited)
- Power Game (1983)
- Los viajes de Gulliver (1983) - Fisherman (voice)
- Histoire d'O: Chapitre 2 (1984)
- Rustlers' Rhapsody (1985) - Real Estate Broker
- La pantalla diabólica (1985)
- Beaks: The Movie (1986) - T.V. Director
- Edge of the Axe (1988) - Reverendo Clinton
- Oro fino (1989)

== Bibliography ==
- Cowie, Peter. World Filmography 1968. Tantivy Press, 1968.
