= Janet Sarno =

American actress (1933–2023)

- Born: Janet Margaret Sarno; November 18, 1933; Bridgeport, Connecticut, U.S.
- Died: March 15, 2023 (aged 89); New York, New York, U.S.
- Education: Central High School; New Haven State Teacher's College; Yale Drama School
- Occupation: Actress
- Years active: 1964–2022
- Spouse(s): Michael Joseph Dontzin (m. 1985; died 2012)

Janet Margaret Sarno (November 18, 1933 – March 15, 2023) was an American character actress of stage, film and television.

== Early life and career ==
Born in Bridgeport, Connecticut, on November 18, 1933, Sarno was the daughter of Margaret (née Daddona) and Italian-born hair stylist Francis "Frank" Sarno, longtime proprietor of Sarno's Beauty Salon. She attended Central High School, New Haven State Teacher's College, and, after teaching for several years at the Hallen Elementary School, Yale Drama School, where, in 1962, she earned her Master of Fine Arts degree, simultaneously winning the Mrs. W William E. Hill. Sr. Award for drama, issued annually to "the actress who best exemplifies the Yale Drama school, scholastically and in acting achievement".

Of her performance that year in the Yale Drama Society's production of Here Comes Santa Claus, playwright in residence Joel Oliansky's black comedy about the relationship between an aging, erstwhile horror movie icon and his son (the former clearly modeled on Bela Lugosi), New York Times critic Howard Taubman, while deeming the work as written uneven but intermittently hilarious, cites the beneficial effect of several "helpful performances", including those of the two leads and of a young Daniel Travanti, and, in particular, Sarno's turn as "a tough, though sensitive girl who does amusing broadcasts for teenagers".

Some of Sarno's more noteworthy Off-Broadway and regional theater credits include performances as Pirate Jenny in Brecht's Threepenny Opera, the stepdaughter in Pirandello's Six Characters in Search of an Author, Melba Snyder in Pal Joey, and, at the Arena Stage in Washington, D.C., Masha in Chekhov's Three Sisters and Sabina in Thornton Wilder's The Skin of Our Teeth. She played "the woman" in Paul Shyre's A Whitman Portrait, and an assortment of characters in the rock opera, The Survival of St. Joan. She starred as Alice in Play Strindberg, as Patsie in Momma's Little Angels by Paul La Russo II, and, in Jane Anderson's The Pink Studio, portrayed both Madame Bidet and Madame Joie.

Sarno's portrayal of Judith Fellowes in a 1989 revival of Tennessee Williams' Night of the Iguana proved one of the special pleasures of an otherwise "uneven" production for Montclair Times critic Naomi Siegel.

One more comment on the cast: Janet Sarno as Miss Judith Fellowes brings a wonderful touch of humor and self righteous buffoonery to her small role. This is what good character acting is all about.

In 2010, Sarno became the titular subject of Janet's Class, a feature-length documentary, which followed Sarno and her acting students, ranging in age from 50 to 92. The film was produced, directed and shot by actress Dorothy Lyman, who had made Sarno's previous film, Split Ends. Scored by Grammy-winning arranger Bill Cunliffe, the film had, as of December 2025, yet to find a commercial distributor, although it did have at least one public screening, in February 2011 at the Andes Hotel in the city of Andes in upstate New York,

== Personal life and death ==
In 1960, Sarno was engaged, but evidently, never married, to Thomas John Morrison. From no later than 1985 until his death in 2012, she was, as noted in his New York Times funeral announcement, the "beloved wife" of New York State Supreme Court Justice Michael Joseph Dontzin, whose "other great passion was to serve as his wife's Stage Door Johnny, accompanying her to each of her theater performances".

On March 15, 2023, Sarno died at her home in New York City at age 89.

== Works ==
=== Plays ===
Plays
| Year | Play | Role | Theater | Notes |
|---|---|---|---|---|
| 1964 | Dylan | Nancy; Reporter; Party Guest, Student; Servant | Plymouth Theatre | January 4, 1964 – September 12, 1964 |
| 1974 | Equus | Elizabeth Almond | Plymouth Theatre; Helen Hayes Theatre | Oct 24, 1974 - Sep 11, 1976; October 5, 1976 - October 2, 1977 |
| 1979 | Knockout | Gracie | Helen Hayes Theatre | May 6, 1979 – Sep 16, 1979 |
| 1996 | The Apple Doesn't Fall... | Madge Wellington | Lyceum Theatre | Apr 14, 1996 – Apr 14, 1996 |
| 2015 | Fish in the Dark | Understudy; Gloria Drexel (Replacement); Rose Kantner (Replacement) | Cort Theatre | Mar 5, 2015 – Aug 1, 2015 |

=== Film ===
| Year | Title | Role | Director | Other cast members | Notes | Refs. |
|---|---|---|---|---|---|---|
| 1970 | The People Next Door | Night Nurse (as Jan Sarno) | David Greene | Eli Wallach, Julie Harris, Deborah Winters | | |
| 1971 | Bananas | Woman (uncredited) | Woody Allen | Woody Allen, Louise Lasser, Carlos Montalban | | |
| 1971 | The Hospital | Nurse Rivers (uncredited) | Arthur Hiller | George C. Scott, Diana Rigg, Barnard Hughes | | |
| 1972 | Across 110th Street | Therese D'Salvio | Barry Shear | Anthony Quinn, Yaphet Kotto, Anthony Franciosa | | |
| 1973 | Family Honor | Dinner Friend | Clark Worswick | | | |
| 1980 | Gorp | Mrs. Kramer | Joseph Ruben | Michael Lembeck, Dennis Quaid, Fran Drescher | | |
| 1986 | Power | Moderator | Sidney Lumet | Richard Gere, Julie Christie, Gene Hackman | | |
| 1991 | The Hard Way | Continental Representative | John Badham | Michael J. Fox, James Woods, Stephen Lang | | |
| 1995 | Italian Movie | Nina | Roberto Monticello | Michael Della Femina, Caprice Benedetti, James Gandolfini | | |
| 2000 | Requiem for a Dream | Mrs. Pearlman | Darren Aronofsky | Ellen Burstyn, Jared Leto, Jennifer Connelly | | |
| 2001 | Passing Stones | Leon's Mother | Roger Majkowski | Roger Majkowski, Tom Ellis, Thomas Majkowski | | |
| 2005 | Rock the Paint | Evelyn | Phil Bertelson | Douglas Smith, Kevin Phillips, Christopher Innvar | | |
| 2005 | Carlito's Way: Rise to Power | Artie Sr.'s Wife | Michael Bregman | Jay Hernandez, Mario Van Peebles, Luis Guzman | | |
| 2009 | Split Ends | Connie Provenzano | Dorothy Lyman | Vincent Pastore, Corinna May, Lawton Paseka | | |
| 2011 | Janet's Class | Herself | Dorothy Lyman | | | |
| 2013 | All Is Bright | Bartender #2 | Phil Morrison | Paul Giamatti, Paul Rudd, Sally Hawkins | | |
| 2013 | The Savage Beast | Madeline | Roger Majkowski | Catherine Lloyd Burns, Orlagh Cassidy, Jen Davis | | |
| 2016 | The Sweet Sublime | NA | Alik Barsoumian | Chase Bolnick | 10-minute short starring Sarno & Bolnick | |
| 2018 | To Dust | Faigy | Shawn Snyder | Géza Röhrig, Matthew Broderick, Samy Voit | | |

=== TV appearances ===
TV
| TV Show | Role | Episode | Year |
|---|---|---|---|
| Faith for Today | Janet (as Janet Margaret Sarno) | | 1968 |
| As the World Turns | Ms. Schultz | | 1970 |
| Search for Tomorrow | Gladys Weed | | 197_ |
| Hardhat and Legs | Josie | | 1980 |
| The Edge of Night | Mrs. Arnold | | 1981 |
| The Baby-Sitters Club | Mrs. Slade | "Dawn and the Haunted House" | 1990 |
| Law & Order | Dr. Goldman | "Forgiveness" | 1992 |
| Law & Order | Marie Costas | "Tabula Rasa" | 1999 |
| Law & Order | Trial Judge Monica Ferrante | "Smoke" | 2003 |
| Law & Order | Trial Judge Monica Ferrante | "C.O.D." | 2004 |
| The Wright Verdicts | Judge Rubino | "Ex-Corpus Delicti" | 1995 |
| 100 Centre Street | | "A Shot in the Dark" | 2001 |
| Conviction | Aunt Renee | "Breakup" | 2006 |
| New Amsterdam | Debra Liu | "Castles Made of Sand" | 2022 |
