= Smoke Rise (band) =

Smoke Rise was an American rock band in 1969–1972. In 1970, they created the first American rock opera, The Survival of St. Joan, based on a play and a libretto by James Lineberger and produced by Oscar-winners Stephen Schwartz and Dave Blume. The 2-record set concept album with libretto was issued in 1971 by Paramount Records (PAS-9000). Smoke Rise was known as a very melodic group with smooth 3 and 4 part harmonies, guitar solos and fills, and a tight rhythm section that rocked with the best groups of the late 1960s and early 1970s.

== Notable productions ==
The Buffalo Production of The Survival of St. Joan set box office records in the fall of 1970 at the Studio Arena Theater in Buffalo, NY. The New York Off-Broadway production was staged at the Anderson Theater in the East Village, with Gretchen Corbett (later of The Rockford Files fame) playing the title role. Another Oscar winner, F. Murray Abraham, was also a member of the cast.

The artwork for the cover of the double album (Paramount PAS 9000) as well as the theatrical poster were created by Grammy Award winning artist David Edward Byrd.

== Members ==
Its members were brothers Hank Ruffin (keyboards), Gary Ruffin (guitar), Stan Ruffin (drums), and Randy Bugg (bass guitar).

In 1972, they replaced Randy Bugg on bass guitar with Bill Turpin, and added Bob Sellmansberger (a former band member now returned from military service) on guitar, and put out a rock single, co-written and produced by Joey Levine, "I Need a Woman" (ATCO Records 45-6851). Its B-side was a bluesy "Late Last Friday Night", written by Gary.
