= The Long Kill =

1999 film

The Long Kill is a 1999 American Western film directed by Bill Corcoran. It was also known as Outlaw Justice. It was shot in Spain. The film was very popular on video.

== Cast ==
- Willie Nelson as Lee Walker
- Kris Kristofferson as Jesse Ray Torrance
- Travis Tritt as Sheriff Dalton
- Waylon Jennings as Tobey Naylor
- Chad Willett as Bryce Naylor
- Sancho Gracia as Holden
- Jonathan Banks as Sheriff Conklin
- Simon Andreu as Colonel Lupo
- Jorge Bosso as Mayor Hunter
- Francis Butler as Picker
- Ignacio Duran as Almeria Chong
- Vincent Ginarbi as Almeria Cheech
- May Heatherly as Mrs. Preble
- Danny Sullivan as Mr. Preble
- Eduardo Hererra as Lloyd
- Leonor Watling as Claire
