= Edge of the Axe =

1988 Spanish slasher film

- Spanish release poster
- Spanish: Al filo del hacha
- Directed by: José Ramón Larraz
- Screenplay by: Joaquín Amichatis; Javier Elorrieta; José Frade; Pablo de Aldebarán
- Produced by: José Frade
- Starring: Barton Faulks; Christina Marie Lane; Page Moseley; Fred Holliday; Jack Taylor; Patty Shepard; May Heatherly; Elmer Modling; Joy Blackburn; Alicia Moro
- Cinematography: Tote Trenas
- Edited by: Barry B. Leirer
- Music by: Javier Elorrieta
- Production companies: Calepas International; José Frade Producciones
- Distributed by: Overseas FilmGroup
- Release dates: May 20, 1988 (Spain); September 15, 1989 (United States)
- Running time: 91 minutes
- Country: Spain
- Language: English

Edge of the Axe (Spanish: Al filo del hacha) is a 1988 English-language Spanish slasher film directed by José Ramón Larraz, and starring Barton Faulks, Christina Marie Lane, Page Moseley, and Fred Holliday. The film centers on a masked maniac murdering people in a rural mountain town in Northern California.

A Spanish production, filming of Edge of the Axe took place in Big Bear Lake, California and Madrid in 1987, and features a cast of American and Spanish actors.

== Plot ==
In the rural Northern California mountain community of Paddock County, nurse Mirna Dobson is viciously murdered by a masked murderer with an axe while driving through a car wash.

Meanwhile, Gerald Martin, an eccentric young man who is obsessed with computers, has recently moved into a cabin on the property of an elderly hermit named Brock. One morning, Gerald accompanies his friend Richard, an exterminator, to investigate a putrid smell in the basement of a local tavern. There, they find the rotting corpse of Mary West, a missing barmaid, lodged in an attic crawlspace. Her death is dismissed as a suicide.

Gerald soon meets Lillian Nebbs, the daughter of another local tavern owner who is home from college. The two bond over their mutual fascination with technology. Late one night, local beautician and prostitute Rita Miller is brutally murdered while walking through town. Her body is found the following morning, crushed by a train on the railroad tracks. Officer Frank McIntosh begins investigating the recent rash of killings. Meanwhile, while entering search commands on a computer Gerald gave her, Lillian finds a list of the three women who have been killed. When she asks him about it, Gerald explains that he regularly makes lists of data for amusement.

During a windstorm one night, another local woman is attacked by the killer, who has infiltrated her home for a second time, having previously broken in and left one of her hogs' severed heads in her bed. The woman flees to her barn, but the killer strikes her in the back with the axe before bludgeoning her to death. While boating on the lake the next day, Richard finds the severed head of a nurse from a local psychiatric hospital. Later that night, Anna Bixby, a leader of Lillian's church choir, finds her dog murdered in her home. When she goes to retrieve her shotgun, the killer, hiding in the pantry, chops her fingers off before hacking her to death.

Lillian confides in Gerald that she has recently discovered her cousin, Charlie, was released from a mental hospital he was admitted to years earlier following a head injury caused when she pushed him from a swing set. She suspects Charlie may be responsible for the killings. Later, Lillian uses Gerald's computer, claiming to be researching a graduate program at the University of Portland. Gerald is puzzled when he finds a list of psychiatrists in the computer's search results log. Lillian admits that she was attempting to research more information about Charlie.

That evening, Laura, Richard's middle-aged artist wife, gets drunk with local Christopher Caplin at the Nebbs' tavern after discovering she is bankrupt. She leaves with Christopher, but crashes her car en route home. She briefly exits the car and rests against a tree. Upon returning to the vehicle, she finds the masked killer in Christopher's seat. The assailant pursues her into the woods and kills her. The next morning, Richard arrives at Gerald's, and tells him Laura never returned home; he claims that she emptied their bank account before disappearing. Laura and Christopher's bodies are found in the woods later that evening. At the crime scene, McIntosh finds a pin from the Nebbs' tavern, leading him and his officers to go question Lillian and her father.

Meanwhile, Lillian, who is home alone, hears strange noises downstairs. Upon investigating them, she is met by Gerald. A frightened Lillian accuses Gerald of in fact being Charlie. He responds by telling her that Charlie is a figment of her imagination; on the computer, he confronts Lillian with supposed medical records of a head injury she sustained years prior, as well as documentation of her psychiatric confinement. Additionally, he produces a list of all the victims, each of whom were either hospital employees who cared for Lillian, or women who were romantically interested in her father. Believing she is being gaslit, Lillian attempts to attack Gerald with an axe. The two fight, and Lillian flees outside with Gerald pursuing her. McIntosh and his deputies arrive just as this occurs, and they swiftly shoot Gerald to death. McIntosh consoles Lillian, who begins to smile maniacally over his shoulder.

== Cast ==
- Barton Faulks as Gerald Martin
- Christina Marie Lane as Lillian Nebbs
- Page Moseley as Richard Simmons
- Fred Holliday as Officer Frank McIntosh
- Patty Shepard as Laura Simmons
- Alicia Moro as Rita Miller
- Jack Taylor as Christopher Caplin
- Joy Blackburn as Susan Nebbs
- May Heatherly as Anna Bixby
- Conrado San Martín as Trevor
- Elmer Modling as Father Clinton

== Production ==
Edge of the Axe was produced by the Florida-based Calepas International, Inc., who partnered with several Spanish filmmakers on such films as The Sea Seperent (1985) and Pulsebeat (1985). Principal photography of Edge of the Axe occurred in Big Bear Lake, California in late June 1987.

The cast was made up of a mixture of American and Spanish actors, with the leading performers being primarily American.

The majority of the exterior scenes were filmed in Big Bear Lake, including the opening credits sequence in which Faulks' character rides his motorcycle through town. Some interior sequences were shot in Madrid, such as the inside of the car wash featured in the opening scene; in post-production, the exterior of the car wash, which was filmed in California, was cross-cut to create the illusion that they are the same location.

== Release ==
=== Home media ===
Edge of the Axe was released in the United States on VHS through M.C.E.G. Home Video on September 15, 1989.

On July 30, 2018, it was announced that Arrow Video would be releasing the film for the first time on Blu-ray sometime in 2019. The Blu-ray was released on January 28, 2020.

== Reception ==
The Toronto Star gave the film a one-star rating, describing it as "talky and tedious, broken up every so often by scenes of violence so explicit that you want to look away. But the effects aren't executed with wit or style, just wanton bloodlust, so there's no real reason for them to be there."

Film scholar Scott Aaron Stine praised the film's production values as the "best Larraz ever had to work with," adding that Edge of the Axe "manages to be an engaging psycho-on-the-loose flick" despite the fact that it "degenerates into a fairly generic slasher flick, having traded the mystery elements for the more standard stalk'n'slash routine." Luisito Joaquín González Martín from the slasher film website Hysteria Lives! awarded the film three out of five stars, writing, "Edge of the Axe may have been released too late to make an impact on the category, but reflection proves that its one of the best late entries to the cycle. Finally after a few attempts, we Spaniards have a slasher movie to be proud of." Todd Martin from HorrorNews.net gave the film a positive review, calling the film "terribly underrated and a little ahead of its time". In his review Martin commended the film's script, and twist ending.

Director Larraz considered Edge of the Axe his worst feature film.

== Sources ==
- Faulks, Barton (2020). Edge of the Axe (Audio commentary). Arrow Video.
- Reyes, Amanda (2020). "American Horrors by Way of Spain: International Co-Productions and the Spanish Slasher". Edge of the Axe (Booklet). Arrow Video. ASIN B07ZLJKMBL.
- Stine, Scott Aaron (2015) [2003]. The Gorehound's Guide to Splatter Films of the 1980s. Jefferson, North Carolina: McFarland. ISBN 978-1-476-61132-7.
- Young, R. G., ed. (2000). The Encyclopedia of Fantastic Film: Ali Baba to Zombies. New York City, New York: Applause. ISBN 978-1-557-83269-6.
