= Jaime de Mora y Aragón =

Spanish noble and actor (1925–1995)

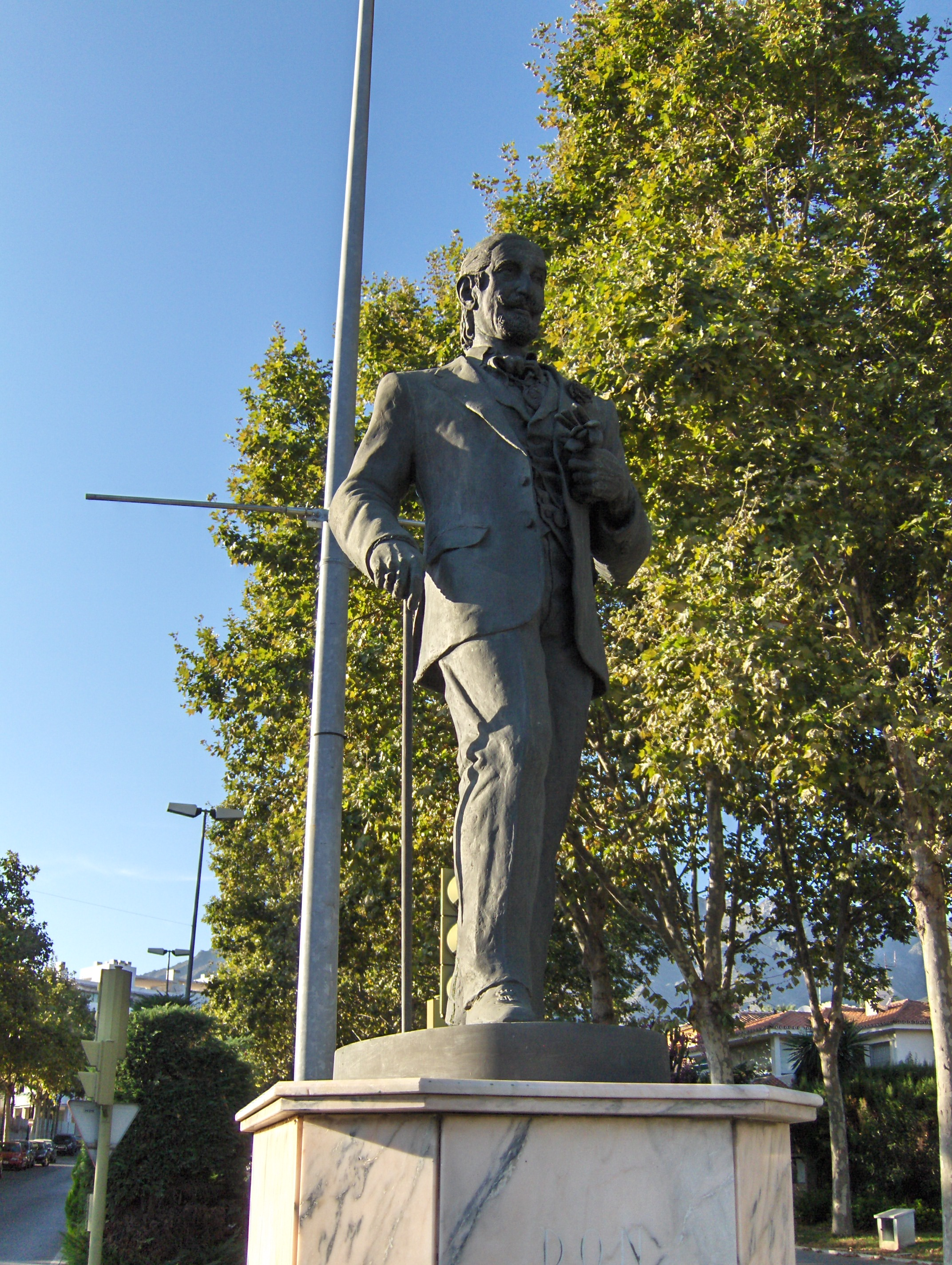
- Statue of de Mora y Aragón in Marbella
- Born: 19 July 1925; Madrid, Spain
- Died: 26 July 1995 (aged 70); Marbella, Spain
- Occupation: Actor
- Years active: 1961–1995

Don Jaime de Mora y Aragón (19 July 1925 – 26 July 1995) was a Spanish aristocrat and actor. He appeared in more than thirty films from 1961 to 1995. He was also a brother of Queen Fabiola of Belgium.

== Selected filmography ==
Year	Title	Role	Notes
1961	The Last Judgment		
1971	Delusions of Grandeur		
1973	Love and Pain and the Whole Damn Thing	The Duke	
