= Fantasy Unlimited =

Fantasy Unlimited was a multimedia artists collective in New York.

== History ==
The collective was founded by Peter Nevard in 1967. One of the co-founders was David Edward Byrd, whom Peter knew from art school. The collective lived and worked on a 110-acre (0.45 km^{2}) farm on the bank of the Neversink River in Port Jervis, NY. Peter Nevard was the leader and had most of the equipment and financial know-how.

The collective consisted of seven artists and did about one major commercial light show a month. These were, at that time, called Press Shows - a new product was presented with strobe lights, liquid projections, slide projections, film, smoke, bubbles, and modern dancers in flesh body suits. David Edward Byrd created projections, art slides, and glass paintings and ran special effects during the various shows.

Notable work:

- Clairol, "The Innocence of Blonde" with Cheryl Tiegs (for Clairol's Innocent Blond range of products)
- Yardley cosmetics, "The Yardley London Look" with Jean Shrimpton
- Bill Blass, "The Bill Blass Collection"

but also work for:

- Bloomingdale's
- Boussac of France (fabrics, now part of Pierre Frey)
- Dayton’s of Minneapolis
- Ralph Lauren
- Oscar de la Renta
- Tenneco Chemicals

among others.

In early 1968, work was started for Bill Graham for venues of major stars in the new Fillmore East Ballroom in Manhattan’s East Village.

Fantasy Unlimited created posters and other art work for, among others, The Jimi Hendrix Experience, Jefferson Airplane and Traffic.

Although the collective only existed for a few years, and may not have been a force culturally, it made some notable contributions (especially the work of David Edward Byrd).

== Trivia ==
Clairol's catchphrase: "Does She... Or Doesn't She?" was coined by Shirley Polykoff

== Gallery ==
Posters created by Fantasy Unlimited (by Byrd) for Bill Graham. The poster for the Jimi Hendrix Experience was voted #8 in the Top 25 Rock Posters by Billboard Magazine.

1968 No.7
Jimi Hendrix Experience
