= Lauren-Marie Taylor =

American actress (born 1961)

- Born: Lauren Marie Schwartz; November 1, 1961 (age 64); New York City, New York, U.S.
- Occupation: Actress
- Years active: 1980–2013; 2024
- Spouse: John Didrichsen (m. 1983)
- Children: 3

Lauren-Marie Taylor (born Lauren Marie Schwartz; November 1, 1961) is an American film and television actress. She is regarded as a "scream queen" for her roles in several horror films. Born and raised in the Bronx, Taylor was scouted by a talent agent while performing in a high school production of Oklahoma! with classmate Ally Sheedy, and began pursuing acting in commercials. Her first major role was as Vickie in the slasher film Friday the 13th Part 2 (1981).

Subsequent film credits include in the black comedy Neighbors (1981), followed by the slasher film Girls Nite Out (1982). From 1983 until 1995, Taylor portrayed Stacey Donovan on the soap opera Loving. She returned to screen acting with a role in the horror film In a Violent Nature (2024).

== Early life and education ==
Taylor was born Lauren Marie Schwartz on November 1, 1961 in the Bronx borough of New York City. She spent her childhood in the South Bronx. She and her brother were raised by their maternal grandparents in a "very Catholic household". She graduated from Loyola School, a Jesuit school in Manhattan. Prior to acting, Taylor considered pursuing a career as a veterinarian. She attended Wagner College, New York University, and the Circle in the Square Theatre School.

== Career ==
As a teenager, while appearing as Ado Annie Carnes in a stage production of Oklahoma! with classmate Ally Sheedy, Taylor was scouted by Sheedy's agent who suggested that she audition for commercial acting work. This led to Taylor appearing in commercials for Burger King before she made her film debut as Vickie in the horror film Friday the 13th Part 2 (1981). Taylor subsequently portrayed John Belushi's character's daughter in the dark comedy film Neighbors (1981), followed by another supporting role in the slasher film Girls Nite Out (1982).

She starred in the soap opera Loving as Stacey Donovan Forbes Alden from 1983 to 1995, the only original cast member to stay with the show for its entire run.

Prior to Loving, Taylor starred in Ryan's Hope as Eleanor Skofield from 1980 to 1981. After Loving, she hosted her own daily crafts series, Handmade by Design, for several years on the Lifetime channel. She has also done numerous TV commercials and off-Broadway plays.

In 2000, she began her career as a kindergarten and first grade teacher, a role she worked full time in for 10 years. She was also active in local community theater, appearing onstage and later directing productions in the New York City metropolitan region. In 2023, Taylor began hosting the Not the Final Girl podcast. Taylor had her first onscreen acting role in over two decades with the slasher film In a Violent Nature, which was filmed in 2021. It premiered at the 2024 Sundance Film Festival before being given a wide theatrical release by IFC Films on May 31, 2024. The same year, Taylor appeared in a supporting role in the Christmas-themed horror film He Sees You When You're Sleeping, co-starring with Caroline Williams.

== Personal life ==
In 1983, Taylor married actor and singer John Didrichsen, whom she met when they were both filming Girls Nite Out in 1981. They have three children, Katherine, Wesley, and Olivia.

Taylor has been a vegetarian since she was a teenager.

== Filmography ==
=== Film ===
Year	Title	Role	Notes	Ref.
1979	Manhattan	Dalton student	Uncredited	
1981	Friday the 13th Part 2	Vickie		
1981	Neighbors	Elaine Keese		
1982	Girls Nite Out	Sheila Robinson		
2013	Crystal Lake Memories: The Complete History of Friday the 13th	Self	Documentary film	
2023	All Hallows' Eve: Trickster	Vickie Godish	(segment "Prettyface")	
2024	In a Violent Nature	The Woman		
2024	He Sees You When You're Sleeping	Sue-Ellen Galveston		
2026	Snake Manor	Pam Ziegler		
2026	Christmas at Aunt Betty’s	Olivia		
2026	Desert Fiends 2	Catherine		

=== Television ===
Year	Title	Role	Notes	Ref.
1980–1981	Ryan's Hope	Eleanor Skofield	3 episodes	
1983–1995	Loving	Stacey Donovan	Main cast	
1985	The Cracker Brothers	Cracker Girl	Television film	
1987	Pound Puppies	Various (voice)	5 episodes	
1996	Handmade by Design	Host		
2006	My First Time	Self	Episode: "Soap Opera Starts"	
2009	His Name Was Jason: 30 Years of Friday the 13th	Self	Documentary film	
