= Dorothy Lyman =

American actress

- Born: April 18, 1947 (age 79); Minneapolis, Minnesota, U.S.
- Occupations: Actress; director; producer
- Years active: 1971–present
- Spouses: John Tillinger (m. 1971; div. 1983) Vincent Malle (m. 1985; div. 2001)
- Children: 3, including Emma Tillinger Koskoff

Dorothy Lyman (born April 18, 1947) is an American television actress, director, and producer. She is most known for her work as Gwen Frame on Another World, on All My Children as the original Opal Sue Gardner, as Rebecca Whitmore on Generations, and on the sitcom Mama's Family as Naomi Harper.

== Life and career ==
Lyman was born on April 18, 1947, in Minneapolis, Minnesota, to Violet E. (née Brightwell) and Hector H. Lyman, who was a stockbroker. She was raised Protestant.

She attended Washburn High School in Minneapolis. She debuted in her first soap opera, A World Apart, as flower child Julie Stark in 1971. Several years later, Dorothy appeared as Elly Jo Jamison, an evil relation of wealthy Orin Hillyer's, (1972–1973) on The Edge of Night, and as architect Gwen Parrish Frame (1976–1980, 1989) on Another World.

Lyman's producing and directing debut came in 1981 with A Couple White Chicks Sitting Around Talking, an off-Broadway comedy.

Her most notable soap opera role, though, was on All My Children as Opal Sue Gardner (1981–1983), for which she received two Emmy Awards—as Outstanding Actress in a Supporting Role in a Daytime Drama Series in 1982 and for Outstanding Actress in a Daytime Drama Series in 1983. Lyman performed characters on other soap operas including Rebecca Whitmore (1990–1991) on Generations, and Bonnie Roberts (1991–1992) on The Bold and the Beautiful.

In 1983, Lyman became well known for her role as Naomi Harper on the sitcom Mama's Family, a role she played for the full six seasons. In an appearance on Vicki Lawrence's talk show Vicki!, Lyman noted that she continued to perform on All My Children concurrently with the beginning of Mama's Family's production, flying back and forth each week between New York City and Los Angeles. While the commute was brutal, she remembered it fondly, referring to that stage of her career as "All My Paychecks".

Lyman's Broadway credits include portraying Jan Morrison in Dancing in the End Zone (1985). During this time, Lyman appeared in the Tales from the Darkside television series in the "In the Cards" episode (1985). She also played Ralphie's mother in Jean Shepherd's Ollie Hopnoodle's Haven of Bliss from 1988, appeared in ALF as Maura Norris in the episode "Tequila" (1988), and in Hunter as Sgt. Carol James Meyers in the episode "The Pit" (1989).

When Mama's Family ended its run in 1990, Lyman went behind the camera, producing and directing 75 episodes of The Nanny (all episodes of the third and fourth seasons, and all but four episodes of the fifth), even making a special guest appearance on the Fran Drescher sitcom. Lyman also had a recurring role on Bob, Bob Newhart's third series.

On the big screen, she made a cameo appearance in I Love Trouble, a film starring Nick Nolte and Julia Roberts. She made another cameo appearance in the 2001 film Blow starring Johnny Depp. She was seen in the 2006 films World Trade Center and The Departed.

In 2007, Lyman guest-starred in the third season of the reimagined Battlestar Galactica as Starbuck's mother. She made a guest appearance on Reba, playing the titular character's mother. She appeared in The Blacklist in the season-six episode "The Pawnbrokers".

Lyman performed My Kitchen Wars in Hollywood and New York as a one-woman show based on the book by Betty Fussell. She wrote and performed in A Rage in Tenure at the Geo Theater in Hollywood in 1995.

In 2010, Lyman produced, directed, and served as cinematographer on the feature-length documentary, Janet's Class. a film whose titular subject, veteran stage and screen character actress/acting teacher Janet Sarno, had appeared previously in Split Ends, Lyman's feature film directorial debut. Summarized by Lyman as simply "a film about aging" and prompted, at least in part, by problems the issue posed to her personally, her new film was conceived with two principal goals in mind: to help the audience—and herself—come to grips with the reality of aging while, at the same time, offering insight into what exactly goes into becoming a capable actor. Scored by Grammy-winning arranger Bill Cunliffe, and featuring Sarno and her church basement disciples ranging in age from 50 to 92, the film had, as of December 2025, failed to find a commercial distributor, although it did have at least one public screening, in February 2011 at the Andes Hotel in the city of Andes in upstate New York, where Lyman resided from 2001 through 2018.

== Personal life ==
From 1971 to 1983, Lyman was married to director and actor John Tillinger; they have two children, including daughter Emma Tillinger Koskoff, who is an Academy Award-nominated producer. Her son, Sebastian Tillinger, is an actor. From her second marriage to French film producer Vincent Malle, Lyman has one son, Jackson Malle, an anthropologist and screenwriter, born in 1985.

== Filmography ==
=== Film ===
Year	Title	Role	Notes
1971	The 300 Year Weekend	Jean	
1980	Night of the Juggler	Nurse Jenny	
1984	Summer Fantasy	Dr. Nancy Brannigan	
1988	Ollie Hopnoodle's Haven of Bliss	Mom	Television film Nominated — CableACE Award for Best Supporting Actress in a Movie or Miniseries
1988	The People Across the Lake	Ruth Mortimer	
1990	Camp Cucamonga	Millie Schector	Television film
1993	Ruby in Paradise	Mildred Chambers	
1993	Jack the Bear	Mrs. Morris	
1993	Young Goodman Brown	Sarah Good	
1994	Tears and Laughter: The Joan and Melissa Rivers Story	Dorothy	Television film
1994	I Love Trouble	Suzie	
1997	Dinner and Driving	Rita	
2001	Blow	Judge	
2006	World Trade Center	Allison's Mother	
2006	The Departed	Woman at Bar	
2008	Split Ends		Director and producer
2009	The Northern Kingdom	Nan	Director and producer
2011	Janet's Class		Director and producer, and cinematographer; Feature-length documentary follows veteran actress/acting teacher Janet Sarno and her class composed entirely of aspirants between the ages of 50 and 92.
2015	Bad Hurt	Mrs. Salisbury	
2016	Blind	Judge	
2018	The Price for Silence	Wendy Moro	
2018	Bullitt County	The Mrs.	
2019	Back Fork	Susie	
2019	Vault	Ma	

=== Television ===
Year	Title	Role	Notes
1971	A World Apart	Julie Stark	Series regular
1972-1973	The Edge of Night	Elly Jo Jamison	Series regular
1975	One Life to Live	Sister Margaret	
1976-1980, 1989	Another World	Gwen Parrish Frame	Series regular
1981-1983	All My Children	Opal Cortlandt	Series regular Daytime Emmy Award for Outstanding Lead Actress in a Drama Series (1983); Daytime Emmy Award for Outstanding Supporting Actress in a Drama Series (1982)
1985	Tales from the Darkside	Catherine	Episode: "In the Cards"
1985	Heart's Island	Johnie Baylor	Pilot
1988	ALF	Maura Norris	Episode: "Tequila"
1989	Hunter	Sgt. Carol James Meyers	Episode: "The Pit"
1983-1990	Mama's Family	Naomi Oates Harper	Series regular, 125 episodes
1990-1991	Generations	Rebecca Whitmore #2	Series regular
1991-1992	The Bold and the Beautiful	Bonnie Roberts	Series regular
1991-1993	Life Goes On	Mary McKenna	9 episodes
1993	Bodies of Evidence	Claudia Brooks	Episode: "Shadows"
1993	Bob	Patty Fleisher	3 episodes
1994	Picket Fences	Miriam Thorne	Episode: "Cold Spell"
1995	Sisters	Dr. Deborah Rosen	Episode: "A Lullaby to My Father"
1995	Hope & Gloria	Maxine	Episodes: "My Mamma Done Told Me" and "Love with an Improper Stranger"
1995	Murder, She Wrote	Norma Shey	Episode: "The Secret of Gila Junction
1993-1998	The Nanny		Director and producer, 74 episodes
2001	Days of Our Lives	Contessa Dorothea DiLyman	Special guest star
2002	Reba	Helen	Episode: "Meet the Parents"
2002	V.I.P.	Granny Goshen	Episode: "Valley Wonka"
1999-2002	The Practice	Dr. Diane Starger	3 episodes
2002	Judging Amy	Ms. Patterson	Episode: "Cause for Alarm"
2003	CSI: Miami	Vivian Kensington	Episode: "Dead Zone"
2005	Law & Order: Special Victims Unit	Principal Parker	Episode: "Alien"
2007	Battlestar Galactica	Socrata Thrace	Episode: "Maelstrom"
2009	Law & Order	Judge Dorothy Carr	Episode: "Reality Bites"
2015	Elementary	Belinda	Episode: "Absconded"
2016	Divorce	Bridget	Episode: "Christmas"
2018	FBI	Jilly Peters	Episode: "Pilot"
2019	The Blacklist	Delaine Uhlman	Episode: "The Pawnbrokers (No. 146/147)"
2022	The Girl from Plainville	Donna Roy	Episode: "Turtle"
2025	Law & Order: Organized Crime	Lucia Spezzano	Episode: "Lago D'Averno"
