= Rutanya Alda =

Latvian-American actress (born 1942)

- Born: Rūta Skrastiņa; October 13, 1942 (age 83); Riga, Reichskommissariat Ostland
- Other names: Ruth Alda, Ruth Avots, Rutanya Skrastiņa
- Education: Northern Arizona University
- Occupation: Actress
- Years active: 1968–present
- Spouse: Richard Bright (m. 1977; died 2006)
- Children: 1

Rutanya Alda (born Rūta Skrastiņa; October 13, 1942) is a Latvian-American actress. She began her career in the late 1960s, and went on to have supporting parts in The Deer Hunter (1978), Rocky II (1979), and Mommie Dearest (1981). She also appeared in a lead role in the horror films Amityville II: The Possession and Girls Nite Out (both 1982).

== Life ==
Rutanya Alda was born Rutanja Skrastiņa (Rūta Skrastiņa) in Riga, in German-occupied Latvia, the daughter of Vera (née Ozoliņa), a businesswoman, and Jānis Skrastiņš, a poet. Alda, her grandmother, her mother, and her brother spent seven years in a displaced persons camp in Allied-occupied Germany after World War II. She then relocated with her family to the United States, briefly living in Chicago before settling in Flagstaff, Arizona.

Alda studied at Northern Arizona University, where she earned a Bachelor of Science degree in economics. She stated in later interviews that she chose to study economics as "a way of pleasing my mother, who wanted me to be a doctor or a lawyer. Economics was considered a pre-law degree at the time. I wanted to be an actress, from the age of 5, when I saw my first play and movie, in the displaced person camps. I never wavered from this passion."

== Career ==
Alda studied acting with Barbara Loden and Paul Mann in New York City. With a career spanning nearly 50 years in show business and over 100 roles, Alda might be best known for her performances in The Deer Hunter as Steven's wife, Angela, as well as for the cult classic Mommie Dearest, as loyal Crawford housekeeper Carol Ann, and Amityville II: The Possession, having been nominated for the Golden Raspberry Award for two years in succession (1982 and 1983) for the latter roles. She has also won a Clio and is a member of the Academy of Motion Picture Arts and Sciences. Additionally, Alda has appeared in numerous television programs, such as Cold Case and CSI: Crime Scene Investigation, and as a featured character in the Ron Perlman/Linda Hamilton TV series Beauty and the Beast, as well as commercials and stage work.

In 2009, she appeared in Stolen, playing the elder version of Jessica Chastain's character, and had a supporting role in the horror film Late Phases (2014). Between 2014 and 2016, Alda appeared in the web series Old Dogs & New Tricks.

== Personal life ==
She was married to actor Richard Bright from 1977 until his death in 2006, when he was hit by a bus in New York City. They had one son named Jeremy.

== Filmography ==
=== Film ===
Year	Title	Role	Notes
1968	Greetings	Linda (Shoplifter)	
1970	Hi, Mom!	Member of audience ('Be Black Baby' section)	
1970	The People Next Door	Nurse	
1971	The Panic in Needle Park	Admitting Nurse	
1973	The Long Goodbye	Rutanya Sweet	
1973	Scarecrow	Woman in Camper	
1973	Pat Garrett and Billy the Kid	Ruthie Lee	
1973	Blume in Love	Welfare Client	Uncredited
1973	Executive Action	Assassination Team B member	Uncredited
1974	Can Ellen Be Saved?	Rachael	Television film
1976	Deadly Hero		
1976	Next Stop, Greenwich Village	Party Guest	Uncredited
1976	Swashbuckler	Bath Attendant	
1978	The Fury	Kristen	
1978	The Deer Hunter	Angela	
1979	Rocky II	Doctor Cooper	
1979	When a Stranger Calls	Mrs. Mandrakis	
1980	Christmas Evil	Theresa	Credited as Ratanya Alda
1981	Mommie Dearest	Carol Ann	
1982	Girls Nite Out	Barney / Katie Cavanaugh	
1982	Amityville II: The Possession	Dolores Montelli	
1983	Vigilante	Vickie Marino	
1984	Racing with the Moon	Mrs. Nash	
1985	Rappin'	Cecilia	
1985	The Stuff	Psychologist	
1987	Black Widow	Irene	
1987	Hotshot	Georgia Kristidis	
1988	Apprentice to Murder	Elma Kelly	
1988	Winnie	Mrs. Paretti	Television film
1989	Last Exit to Brooklyn	Georgette's Mother	
1989	Gross Anatomy	Mama Slovak	
1989	Prancer	Aunt Sarah	
1990	Rainbow Drive	Marge Crawford	Television film
1992	Article 99	Ann Travis	
1992	Leaving Normal	Palmer Hospital Nurse	
1993	The Dark Half	Miriam Cowley	
1993	Children of the Mist	Sue Madehearst	
1994	The Ref	Linda	
1994	Safe Passage	Beth	
1996	Innocent Victims	Lorraine Taylor	Television film
1996	Double Jeopardy	Gabriel Neuland	Television film
1997	American Perfekt	Gloria	
1997	Steel	Mrs. Hunt	
1998	The Souler Opposite	Thea's Mom	
2001	My First Mister	Woman at Apartment	
2001	The Glass House	Vice Principal	
2003	Love Comes Softly	Wanda Marshall	Television film
2004	Murder Without Conviction	Virginia McAlpin	Television film
2005	Mystery Woman: Snapshot	Marsha	Television film
2005	Detective	Judge Beatrice Agannis	Television film
2009	Handsome Harry	Mrs. Schroeder	
2009	Stolen	Older Sally Ann	
2010	You Don't Know Jack	Vendor	Television film
2010	Unring the Bell	Belle	Short film
2011	Return	Mrs. Miller	
2011	Too Big to Fail	Admiral Evans	Television film
2014	Late Phases	Gloria Baker	
2015	Ovum	Barbara	
2016	Split	Melissa	
2025	Land of the Mustaches	Storyteller	
2025	The Scout	Anna	

=== Select television roles ===
- Cannon (1 episode, 1973) – Mrs. Degnan
- ABC Weekend Specials (1986) – Mrs. Linderman
- Spenser: For Hire (1987) – Estelle
- Beauty and the Beast (1988) – Sarah / Mary
- Santa Barbara (5 episodes, 1990) – Mabel Beaufort
- Tales from the Crypt (1991) – Mildred
- Law & Order (2 episodes, 1992-2008) – Ruth Devon / Sara Cheney
- Silk Stalkings (1995) – Jennifer Atkins
- Gun (1997) – Clara Munday
- JAG (episode "Heroes", 1997) — Elaine Harridan
- To Have & to Hold (1998) – Ms. McDougall
- Judging Amy (2001) – Celia Loomis
- John Doe (2002) – Cassie Barker
- Law & Order: Criminal Intent (episode "In the Dark", 2004) – Rose
- Mystery Woman (2005) – Marsha
- CSI: Crime Scene Investigation (2005) – Faye Matthews
- Cold Case (2006) – Jenny

=== Web ===
- Old Dogs & New Tricks (2014–16) – Barbara Fiere
