= John Baker (runner) =

American runner (1944–1970)

John Willard Baker (June 29, 1944—November 26, 1970) while a runner for the University of New Mexico (1967) he won the WAC Cross-Country Championship twice and was the WAC Champion in the mile. He received his degree in physical education from University of New Mexico. After he graduated he became the first physical education teacher at Aspen Elementary in Albuquerque, New Mexico when it opened. John Baker also started a running team called the Duke City Dashers.

Baker was later diagnosed with cancer; he died shortly thereafter, at the age of 26.

The students in the school petitioned the school board to change the name of Aspen Elementary to John Baker Elementary. The school's name was changed the next year, where an astounding 520 people voted for the change, and no one against it, and is still called John Baker Elementary.

== A Shining Season ==
Bill Buchanan wrote a full-length biography of Baker called A Shining Season. A TV movie based on the book was created in 1979. Timothy Bottoms portrayed John Baker in the movie, and Ed Begley Jr. portrayed Duke City Dashers assistant coach John Haaland. John Baker was told he had 6 months to live, at the time of diagnosis; he lived a year beyond the expectation his doctor gave him.

== John Baker's Last Race ==
Brigham Young University also made a movie about John Baker in 1976 entitled John Baker's Last Race. A DVD of the movie is available through BYU's Creative Works Office.
