= Torrejón City =

1962 film

- Directed by: León Klimovsky
- Written by: Manuel Tamayo; Antonio de Lara; Ramón Barreiro; José Antonio Verdugo; León Klimovsky
- Screenplay by: Rafael J. Salvia
- Produced by: Esther Cruz
- Cinematography: Manuel Hernández-Sanjuán
- Edited by: Antonio Gimeno
- Music by: Gregorio García Segura
- Production company: Estudios Ballesteros
- Distributed by: D.C. Films
- Release date: 19 November 1962 (Barcelona)
- Running time: 89 minutes
- Country: Spain
- Language: Spanish

Torrejón City is a 1962 Spanish comedy western film directed by León Klimovsky, produced by Tyrys Films, scored by Gregorio García Segura, and starring Tony Leblanc in the role of the sheriff Tom and the homonym cousin, and May Heatherly in her first role film. It was shot in Casa de Campo in Madrid.

It is considered the first eurowestern film alongside Gunmen of the Rio Grande (1964), directed by Tulio Demicheli.

== Cast ==
- Tony Leblanc as Tom 'El Bueno' / Tim 'El Malo'
- May Heatherly as Ruth
- Antonio Garisa as Tío Sam
- Beni Deus as Doug
- Venancio Muro as Fiscal
- Francisco Moran as Mac
- Mara Laso as Peggy
- Mary Begoña as Prostituta
- Xan das Bolas as Ojo de Halcón
- Luis Sanchez Polak as Funerario
- Esther Cruz as Prostituta
- José Álvarez Canalejas as Mejicano
- Simón Arriaga as Buitre
- Juan Antonio Peral as Buch (as Antonio Peral)
- José Luis Zalde as Banquero
- José Luis Heredia as Indio
- Antonio Moreno as Sheriff Morris
- Luis Alonso
- Agustín Bescos as Ferroviario
- Maria Alvarez as Prostituta
- Enrique Núñez as Juez
- Víctor Iregua as Muchacho con armonica
- Sandalio Hernández as Ciudadano
- Gonzalo de Esquiroz as Jinete en créditos
- Álvaro de Luna as Pelea en saloon
