= Page Moseley =

American actor

- Born: John Page Moseley; Mooresville, North Carolina, U.S.
- Education: North Carolina School of The Arts (BFA)
- Occupations: Television, film actor
- Years active: 1982–1996

John Page Moseley, sometimes credited as Page Mosely, is an American actor who appeared on the daytime television soap opera Santa Barbara as Dylan Hartley from 1985 to 1986. Moseley is also known for his roles in horror films during the 1980s, such as Girls Nite Out (1984), Open House (1987), Edge of the Axe (1988), and The Jigsaw Murders (1989).

== Early years ==
Moseley was born in Mooresville, North Carolina. After graduating from the North Carolina School of The Arts with a BFA in Theatre, he moved to New York City.

== Career ==
Moseley appeared in numerous Off Broadway theatrical productions. In 1984, Page moved to Los Angeles after landing a role on daytime's "Santa Barbara". Two years later, Page started his own entertainment company, Pager Inc., that helped promote small theater productions in and around Winston-Salem and Charlotte, North Carolina. At the same time, he also made numerous guest appearances on various television series in the 1980s and 1990s. He gave up acting in Hollywood in 1995 to venture into the financial loan business as an agent in Van Nuys, California.

== Filmography ==
| Year | Film/TV credit | Role | Notes |
|---|---|---|---|
| 1982 | Girls Nite Out | Pledge One | |
| 1985–86 | Santa Barbara | Dylan Hartley | Soap opera |
| 1987 | Hunk | Coaster Royce | |
| 1987 | Open House | as Toby | |
| 1988 | Edge of the Axe | Richard Simmons | |
| 1988 | Sledge Hammer! | Rocket | ABC TV series |
| 1989 | Quantum Leap | Frankie La Palma | in episode "Double Identity" (#1.6) |
| 1989 | CBS Summer Playhouse | Cloyd | Program segment titled "Microcops" |
| 1989 | The Jigsaw Murders | Photographer | |
| 1991 | Seeds of Tragedy | Marion | TV movie |
| 1992 | Beverly Hills 90210 | Freddie Kramer | in episode "Things to Do on a Rainy Day" (#2.26) |
| 1992 | Inside Out | | "Playboy" video |
| 1993 | Civil Wars | | 2 episodes |
| 1993 | What's Love Got to Do with It | Ritz Announcer | |
| 1992 | Shadow of Obsession | | TV movie |
| 1995–96 | Melrose Place | Vic Munson | 3 episodes |
| 1996 | Silk Stalkings | Noah Burke | in episode "Body Electric" (#5.22) |
| 1996 | Yesterday's Target | Ricky | TV movie |
