= Bullitt County (film) =

2018 film directed by David McCracken

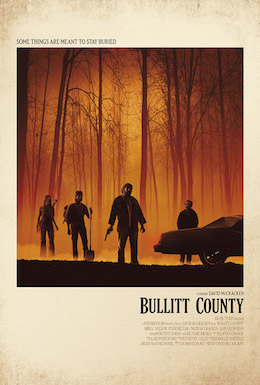
- Official poster
- Directed by: David McCracken
- Written by: David McCracken
- Produced by: Josh Riedford
- Starring: Mike C. Nelson; Jenni Melear; David McCracken; Napoleon Ryan; Richard Riehle; Dorothy Lyman
- Cinematography: Sean McDaniel
- Edited by: Kevin Del Colle
- Music by: Aaron Riedford
- Production company: Mr. Pictures
- Distributed by: Gravitas Ventures
- Release date: October 26, 2018 (United States)
- Running time: 98 minutes
- Country: United States
- Language: English
- Box office: $11,257 (USA)

Bullitt County is a 2018 American thriller film written and directed by David McCracken and produced by Josh Riedford through their co-owned production company Mr. Pictures. It stars Mike C. Nelson, Jenni Melear, David McCracken, Napoleon Ryan, Richard Riehle, and Dorothy Lyman. The film follows four friends who reunite in 1977 for a bachelor party to hunt for buried Prohibition money on Kentucky's Bluegrass Bourbon Trail, only to become ripped apart by greed, corruption, and murder.

The film debuted at the 2017 Austin Film Festival and was later purchased by Gravitas Ventures for distribution. It was released theatrically beginning October 26, 2018 in partnership with AMC Theatres.

== Plot ==
While Wayne sleeps in their parked car, Keaton and Robin don masks and sneak into a house to kidnap Gordie, who is asleep in his room. When Gordie puts up a fight, Robin knees him in the crotch and Keaton hits him with a dose of ether. The kidnappers throw the unconscious Gordie into the trunk of the car and drive off.

The next day and it is revealed that Gordie, Keaton, Robin, and Wayne are longtime best friends from college and have reunited for Gordie's bachelor party in Red River, Kentucky. They plan to visit all their favorite distilleries along the Bluegrass Bourbon Trail and find the one distillery they could never locate in college – Arcadia. When they discover their favorite distillery has been turned into a winery, Gordie wanders off to a small antique shop. There he learns the legend of the Bullitt Treasure, buried Prohibition money rumored to be hidden somewhere in Bullitt County. It is also revealed that Gordie is a recovering alcoholic, sober now for almost ten years.

Gordie convinces his friends they should ditch their plans and look for buried treasure, and the four friends set up camp deep in the woods of rural Kentucky. They spend several days digging and hanging out by the campfire, drinking and getting high and singing.

Their adventure is interrupted by an elderly couple, introduced as Mr. and Mrs. Hitchens, who invite the campers back to their nearby house for a home-cooked meal. Keaton discovers their name is actually Bullitt, and the husband accuses the friends of stealing his family's treasure. As the situation escalates, Gordie grabs a rifle off the wall and kills Mr. Bullitt, then locks Mrs. Bullitt in the chicken coop. As Gordie, Keaton, and Wayne clean the house, Robin shoots and buries Mrs. Bullitt.

Panicked and exhausted, the friends race to tear down their camp and remove all trace of their expedition, but Gordie wanders back to the house and begins drinking Mr. Bullitt's bourbon stash, lapsing into an unhinged version of himself. During the confrontation that follows, it is revealed that Keaton had, in fact, found the treasure and was keeping it from the other three. Gordie pulls the pistol on Keaton, but Robin pepper sprays him first, and in a panic, he fires off four shots. Keaton is hit in the femoral artery and crawls off into the woods. Gordie leaves the pistol and stalks off after Keaton, with Wayne in tow. Robin grabs the pistol and heads after Gordie. Keaton manages to stop Robin before she shoots Gordie, and she realizes Keaton desperately needs medical attention. She leaves the gun with Keaton and hurries off to find help. Gordie soon locates Keaton, takes the gun, leaves Keaton for dead, and begins hunting Robin.

Through a series of flashbacks from college, it is revealed that Wayne has actually been dead for ten years, having been hit by Gordie who was drunkenly driving Keaton and Robin home from a night of partying. The friends buried the corpse and swore each other to secrecy. Unable to cope, Gordie has been seeing Wayne ever since, the embodiment of his guilt.

As Robin tears through the forest, she falls down an embankment into a tangle of barbed wire and Gordie catches up to her. He attempts to shoot her, but there are no bullets in the gun. Gordie is shot in the back by Mrs. Bullitt, whose life Robin had spared the previous night. Robin is left to struggle out of the barbed wire on her own, and with her last bit of strength, she manages to find the Arcadia Distillery.

The film ends with a flashback to a month after Wayne was killed, the three friends sitting in a bar uncomfortably trying to live a normal life after what they've done. The last shot is Wayne appearing to Gordie for the first time.

== Cast ==
- Mike C. Nelson as Gordie Solomon
- Jenni Melear as Robin 'Robo'
- David McCracken as Keaton 'Keats'
- Napoleon Ryan as Wayne
- Richard Riehle as The Mr. Hitchens Bullitt
- Dorothy Lyman as The Mrs. Hitchens Bullitt
- Alysia Livingston as Carolyn
- Sam Kuban as Big Aviators
- Rita Hight as Wine Guide
- B.J. McCracken as Mr. Jenkins
- Colin Neeley as Bar Bros
- David Reidford as Bar Bros
- Richard Reidford as Bartender

== Development and production ==
The writing and development for Bullitt County took the better part of two years from 2015 to 2016, as filmmakers David McCracken and Josh Riedford were both working full-time at other jobs, McCracken at the El Rey Network and Riedford as a freelance musician. The concept for the plot grew loosely from the personal experiences of McCracken and Riedford, the filmmaking duo known collectively as Mr. Pictures. Roommates from college in Evansville, Indiana, the premise of the film was influenced by their frequent camping trips, visits to distilleries on the Kentucky Bourbon Trail, and their longtime friendship, both personally and professionally. Early drafts of the screenplay were set in modern day, but McCracken realized that many of the issues with the story could be resolved by setting the story in 1977. This included being able to isolate the characters without having to explain why cell phones don't work, as well as thematic material like Gordie's constant suppression and the undercurrent of women's rights. "There were all these things I was trying to get at, but I couldn’t think of how to do it well. Then I saw Fargo season two, my favorite season of TV ever. It’s set in the ’70s and it just kind of clicked."

The film was shot over the course of one month in the fall of 2016 in southern Indiana and parts of Kentucky. Most of the cast and crew were flown in from Los Angeles for the duration of the shoot, so the film could be shot on location in the Midwest. The small town of New Harmony, Indiana was used in place of the fictional Red River, KY to provide a 1970s nostalgic backdrop for the story.

According to McCracken, the overall style of Bullitt County was influenced by counterculture films of the 1970s as well as filmmakers like Stanley Kubrick and the Coen brothers. "And Stephen King; I think he’s at his best when his characters are growing up and going through terrible things together. That’s generally what kind of drove me on this movie in particular."

Production was funded through a Kickstarter campaign.

== Soundtrack ==
Bullitt County (Original Motion Picture Soundtrack)

Soundtrack album by Aaron Riedford, Sean Brennan, Tim Ellis
- Released: 4 October 2018
- Genre: Soundtrack
- Length: 58:49
- Label: Mr. Pictures
- Producer: Josh Riedford

The score was composed by Aaron Riedford, with original songs written by Sean Brennan and Tim Ellis. It was released digitally on October 4, 2018, by Mr. Pictures, followed by a limited edition CD print release.

== Release ==
Bullitt County world premiered at the Austin Film Festival in October 2017. During the remainder of its festival run in 2018, the film received numerous awards, including Best Feature Film at the Catalina Film Festival and Best Director at the Hoboken International Film Festival. It was released theatrically in the United States on October 26, 2018, in partnership with AMC Theatres. The film was acquired by Gravitas Ventures for international release on VOD and DVD.

=== Box office ===
Bullitt County opened in the United States in select theaters on October 26, 2018 in a total of eight cities. It grossed $6,511 in its opening weekend, with a total domestic gross of $11,257 during a three-week theatrical run.

=== Critical response ===
Bullitt County received mixed reviews from critics. On Rotten Tomatoes the film has an approval rating of 50% approval rating based on reviews from 14 critics, with an average rating of 5.1/10. On Metacritic, the film has a weighted average score of 50 out of 100 based on reviews from 5 critics, indicating "mixed or average" reviews.

Michael Rechtshaffen of the Los Angeles Times gave a positive review, saying: “While McCracken delivers the requisite amount of explosive, blood-spattered Midnight Movie mayhem, and benefits from some seasoned Southern Gothic turns by Robert Riehle and Dorothy Lyman, he also injects the film with weightier observations regarding shared guilt and repression.” Matt Zoller Seitz of RogerEbert.com gave the film two out of four stars and said, “The deeper you travel into the maze of "Bullitt County," the more you may wish it had settled for being a straightforward character drama with suspense trappings, instead of a puzzle-box movie. The cast and crew have an American classic in them, but this ain't it.” André Hereford was critical in his Film Journal International review, saying “This sort of American horror story demands a strong sense of time and place that’s lacking here in the locations (shot in rural Indiana), the accents, the overwrought score and the awkwardly staged action.” Frank Ochieng of Screen Anarchy felt that the film hit its target, saying “McCracken's creative topsy-turvy script and the atmospheric tension it provides in its edgy storytelling gives Bullitt County its riveting rawness as a compelling character study set against the bloody boundaries of organic thrills.”
