= Timothy Bottoms =

American actor & film producer (born 1951)

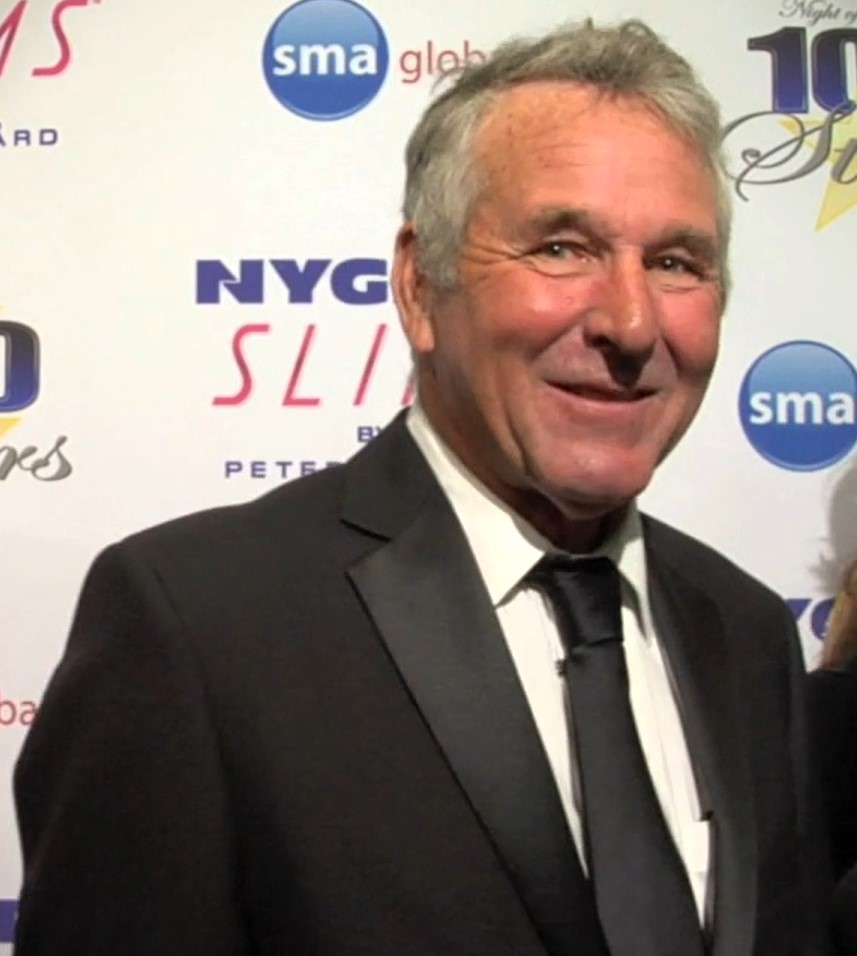
- Bottoms in 2015
- Born: Timothy James Bottoms; August 30, 1951 (age 75); Santa Barbara, California, U.S.
- Occupations: Actor, producer
- Years active: 1970–present
- Notable credit: James T. Hart in The Paper Chase
- Spouses: Alicia Cory (m. 1975; div. 1982) Marcia Morehart (m. 1984)
- Children: 4
- Relatives: Joseph Bottoms (brother); Sam Bottoms (brother)

Timothy James Bottoms (born August 30, 1951) is an American actor and film producer. He is best known for playing the lead in Johnny Got His Gun (1971); Sonny Crawford in The Last Picture Show (1971), where he and his fellow co-stars, Cybill Shepherd and Jeff Bridges, rose to fame; and as James Hart, the first-year law student who battles with Prof. Kingsfield, in the film adaptation The Paper Chase (1973). He is also known for playing the main antagonist in the disaster film Rollercoaster (1977) and for playing President George W. Bush multiple times, including on the sitcom That's My Bush!, the comedy film The Crocodile Hunter: Collision Course and the docudrama DC 9/11: Time of Crisis.

== Early life ==
Bottoms was born in Santa Barbara, California, the eldest of four sons of Betty (née Chapman) and James "Bud" Bottoms, a sculptor and art teacher.

He graduated from Santa Barbara High School in 1970. During his time there he gained acting and singing experience during various theater productions.

== Career ==
Bottoms made his film debut in 1971 as Joe Bonham in Dalton Trumbo's Johnny Got His Gun. The same year, he appeared alongside his brother Sam in The Last Picture Show. (He portrayed the same character in the 1990 sequel Texasville). In 1973's The Paper Chase, he starred as Harvard law student Hart facing the fearsome Professor Kingsfield (John Houseman). Among the other films he has appeared in are Love and Pain and the Whole Damn Thing (1973), The Crazy World of Julius Vrooder (1974), Operation Daybreak (1975), A Small Town in Texas (1976), Rollercoaster (1977) Hurricane (1979), Invaders from Mars (1986) and Elephant (2003).

As a result of both a physical resemblance to U.S. President George W. Bush and an ability to impersonate his voice, Bottoms has portrayed Bush in three widely varying productions. In 2000 and 2001, he played a parody of Bush in the Comedy Central sitcom That's My Bush!; he subsequently appeared as Bush in a cameo appearance in the family film The Crocodile Hunter: Collision Course. Finally, following the September 11 attacks, Bottoms once again played Bush, this time in a serious fashion, in the TV film DC 9/11: Time of Crisis, one of the first films to be based upon the attacks.

He appeared in a recurring role during the first season of the FX series Dirt as Gibson Horne, owner of the magazine for whom the main character Lucy Spiller, played by Courteney Cox, worked.

He also co-produced the documentary Picture This – The Times of Peter Bogdanovich in Archer City, Texas (1991), a behind-the-scenes work about the making of the films The Last Picture Show and Texasville. In the documentary, he revealed that he had a crush on his co-star Cybill Shepherd during The Last Picture Show, but she did not reciprocate his romantic feelings, even though she said in a separate interview that she found him "very attractive". He was also heavily featured in the Metallica video for "One", which featured footage of the film Johnny Got His Gun. In 2023, Bottoms released a novel entitled The Pier. The story follows a young boy out fishing for a day and the people and situations he encounters. The book was published by Tall Tales Press.

== Personal life ==
He is the oldest brother of actors Joseph Bottoms, Sam Bottoms, and Ben Bottoms.

Bottoms and singer Alicia Cory married in 1975. They had a son before divorcing in 1982. His 1984 marriage to Marcia Morehart produced three children.

== Filmography ==
=== Film ===
- Johnny Got His Gun (1971) as Joe Bonham
- The Last Picture Show (1971) as Sonny Crawford
- Love and Pain and the Whole Damn Thing (1973) as Walter Elbertson
- The Paper Chase (1973) as Hart
- The White Dawn (1974) as Daggett
- The Crazy World of Julius Vrooder (1974) as Vrooder
- Operation Daybreak (1975) as Jan Kubis
- A Small Town in Texas (1976) as Poke Jackson
- The Story of David (1976, TV movie) as young David
- Rollercoaster (1977) as Young Man
- The Other Side of the Mountain Part 2 (1978) as John Boothe
- Hurricane (1979) as Jack Sanford
- The High Country (1981) as Jim
- Tin Man (1983) as Casey
- Hambone and Hillie (1983) as Michael Radcliffe
- The Census Taker (1984) as Pete
- What Waits Below (1984) as Maj. Elbert Stevens
- The Sea Serpent (aka Serpiente de Mar) (1985) as Pedro Fontán
- In the Shadow of Kilimanjaro (1986) as Jack Ringtree
- Invaders from Mars (1986) as George Gardner
- The Fantasist (1986) as Danny Sullivan
- Mio min Mio (Mio in the Land of Faraway) (1987) as The King
- The Drifter (1988) as Arthur
- Return from the River Kwai (1989) as Seaman Miller
- A Case of Honor (1989) as Sgt. Joseph 'Hard' Case
- Istanbul (1989) as Frank
- Texasville (1990) as Sonny Crawford
- Digger (1993) as Sam Corlett
- Blue Sky (1994) as Owens Ranch Cowboy (uncredited)
- Ava's Magical Adventure (1994) as Slayton
- Ill Met by Moonlight (1994) as Egeus
- Horses and Champions (1994) as Ben Choice
- Top Dog (1995) as Nelson Houseman
- Ripper Man (1995) as Charles Walkan
- Hourglass (1995) as Jurgen Brauner
- Desperate Obsession (1995)
- American Hero (1995, Video Game) as Jack Armstrong
- Lone Tiger (1996) as Marcus
- Total Force (1996) as Drake
- Uncle Sam (1996) as Donald Crandall
- Ringer (1996) as Clay
- The Prince (1996) as John
- Absolute Force (1997) as Lt. John Drake
- Tiger (1997) as Larry
- Mr. Atlas (1997) as Phillip Frodden
- The Man in the Iron Mask (1998) as Fouquet
- Mixed Blessings (1998) as Carl Weaver
- Diamondbacks (1998) as Ed Williams
- The Waterfront (1998) as Salvatore Solleto
- No Rest for the Wicked (1998) as Father Jeremy
- The Prince and the Surfer (1999) as Johnny Canty (uncredited)
- The Boy with the X-Ray Eyes (1999) as John Carver
- Black Sea 213 (2000) as Dean
- The Hiding Place (2000) as Jack
- Held for Ransom (2000) as Fred Donovan
- The Crocodile Hunter: Collision Course (2002) as President George Walker Bush (uncredited)
- Elephant (2003) as Mr. McFarland
- The Entrepreneurs (2003) as Rotunno
- The Girl Next Door (2004) as Mr. Kidman
- Illusion Infinity (a.k.a. Paradise, 2004) as Francis / Douglas / Henry / Patricia's Father / Older Alan
- Pocket Angel (2004)
- Paradise, Texas (2005) as Mack Cameron
- Shanghai Kiss (2007) as Adelaide's Father
- Along the Way (2007) as Michael McCaffery
- Chinaman's Chance: America's Other Slaves (2008) as Thomas
- Parasomnia (2008) as Dr. Emil Corso
- I Am Somebody: No Chance in Hell (2008) (original title: Chinaman's Chance)
- An American Girl: Chrissa Stands Strong (2009) as Paul Maxwell
- Call of the Wild (2009) as Heep
- The Land That Time Forgot (2009) as Captain Burroughs
- Pound of Flesh (2010) as Cameron Morris
- Hello Stranger (2011) as Sheriff
- 1 Nighter (2012) as Louie
- Realm of the Mole Men (2012) as Willy
- Welcome to the Men's Group (2016) as Larry
- Railroad to Hell: A Chinaman's Chance (2018) as Thomas
- The Shed (2019) as Ellis

=== Television ===
- Look Homeward, Angel (1972, TV Movie) as Eugene Gant
- Winesburg, Ohio (1973)
- The Story of David (1976, TV Movie) as David
- The Moneychangers (1976, TV Mini-Series) as Miles Eastin
- The Gift of Love (1978, TV Movie) as Rudi Miller
- A Shining Season (1979, TV Movie) as John Baker
- Escape (1980, TV Movie) as Dwight Worker
- East of Eden (1981, TV Mini-Series) as Adam Trask
- Love Leads the Way: A True Story (1984, TV Movie) as Morris Frank
- Perry Mason: The Case of the Notorious Nun (1986, TV Movie) as Father Thomas O'Neil
- The Hitchhiker (1987, TV Series) as Peter
- Island Sons (1987, TV Movie) as Tim Faraday
- The Twilight Zone (1988, Episode: "The Hellgramite Method") as Miley Judson
- Freddy's Nightmares (1989, TV Series) as Mr. Franklin
- The Ray Bradbury Theater (1990, Episode: "Here There Be Tygers") as Driscoll
- Land of the Lost (1991, TV Series) as Tom Porter
- 500 Nations (1995, TV Mini-Series) (voice)
- Yakuza Connection (1995, TV Movie) as Ward Derderian
- Personal Vendetta (1995, TV Movie) as Zach Blackwell
- Death Game (1997, TV Movie) as Jack
- Murder Seen (2000, TV Movie) as Detective Stepnoski
- Gideon's Crossing (2000, TV Series) as Rev. Chuck
- That's My Bush! (2001, TV Series) as George W. Bush
- That '70s Show (2002, TV Series) as Vice Principal Cole
- DC 9/11: Time of Crisis (2003, TV Movie) as President George W. Bush
- Ike: Countdown to D-Day (2004, TV Movie) as Walter Bedell "Beetle" Smith
- NCIS: Naval Criminal Investigative Service (2004, TV Series) as Ritt Everett
- Jane Doe: Now You See It, Now You Don't (2005, TV Movie) as Clarence
- Vampire Bats (2005, TV Movie) as Hank Poelker
- Grey's Anatomy (2005, TV Series) as Carl Murphy
- Deceit (2006, TV Movie) as Martin Ford
- Dirt (2007, TV Series) as Gibson Horne
- Holiday in Handcuffs (2007, TV Movie) as Richard Chandler
- Deadly Suspicion (2008, TV Movie) as Sheriff Carl Lovett
- Lone Rider (2008, TV Movie) as Gus
- Bound by a Secret (2009, TV Movie) as Will Hutchinson

=== Video game ===
- Fox Hunt (1996) as Frank
- American Hero (shot in 1995, cancelled in 1997, and finally released in 2021) as Jack Armstrong

== Producer ==
- Picture This: The Times of Peter Bogdanovich in Archer City, Texas (1991)
