= David Edward Byrd =

American graphic artist (1941–2025)

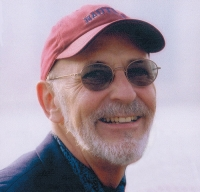
- Byrd in 2005, taken by Don Saban
- Born: April 4, 1941; Cleveland, Tennessee, U.S.
- Died: February 3, 2025 (aged 83); Albuquerque, New Mexico, U.S.
- Education: Carnegie Mellon University
- Known for: Graphic design Painting; Poster art
- Movement: Post-Modern Decorative Arts
- Spouse: Jolino Beserra
- Awards: Grammy Award

David Edward Byrd (April 4, 1941 – February 3, 2025) was an American graphic artist, designer, illustrator, and painter. Many of his designs are considered to have helped to define the look of rock and roll music, starting in the 1960s. He was best known for his poster designs, which included rock posters for Fillmore East and Broadway theatre posters. Byrd's poster for the Broadway play Godspell is among his most famous works.

== Early life and education ==
David Byrd was born April 4, 1941, in what is now Cleveland, Tennessee. After his parents divorced, he was raised by his mother and stepfather in Miami Beach, Florida.

Byrd claimed his childhood was an unhappy one as his mother and stepfather frequently hosted raucous parties where Byrd, as a young boy, had to work as a bartender. He graduated from Miami Beach High School in 1959, attended the Boston Museum School for a year and then Carnegie-Mellon University in Pittsburgh, Pennsylvania, where he received a BFA in Painting and Design in 1964 and an MFA in Painting and Printmaking in 1966.

While studying in Pittsburgh, Byrd worked in a steel mill to pay for his education because his stepfather refused to. His mother, by then an alcoholic, visited him just once while he was in Pittsburgh and was intoxicated during the visit. Years later, in 1962, he would discover his dead mother's body lying next to sleeping pills and a bottle of vodka.

After receiving his BFA, Byrd moved to Pittsburgh to work at WQED-TV, where he did design for the nascent Mister Rogers' Neighborhood show. He was subsequently asked back to Carnegie-Mellon to complete his graduate work. From 1970 to 1979, Byrd taught at the Pratt Institute and the School of Visual Arts.

== Rock posters and album covers ==
In 1968, a number of college classmates (including Joshua White of Joshua Light Show) encouraged rock promoter Bill Graham to hire Byrd to create posters for the newly opened Fillmore East Ballroom in Manhattan's East Village. Byrd was reportedly hired on the spot after showing his portfolio to Bill Graham and signed on as the exclusive poster and program designer, beginning with a poster for the upcoming Traffic event. In the period 1968 to 1973, he and Fantasy Unlimited created posters for Jimi Hendrix, Iron Butterfly, Jefferson Airplane, Ravi Shankar, Traffic, and Bill Graham favorite the Grateful Dead. The poster that Byrd created for Bill Graham's Fillmore East, for the Jimi Hendrix Experience, was voted #8 in the Top 25 Rock Posters by Billboard Magazine.

Byrd created the poster for The Rolling Stones American Tour 1969, which culminated in Altamont concert in Northern California. When the four members of the rock band Kiss released individual solo albums in 1978, Byrd was hired to create an individual poster for each album, designed in such a way so they all could be hung together as a mural.

Byrd worked with The Who for their rock opera Tommy, designing the poster for the band's 1971 performance at the Metropolitan Opera House. Byrd did the movie poster for the 1975 adaptation of Nathanael West's The Day of the Locust starring Donald Sutherland and Karen Black. He illustrated the cover of the 1974 album Sally Can't Dance by Lou Reed, and the 2016 album Lou Reed - The RCA and Arista Collection; as well as the 1969 album CJ Fish by Country Joe and The Fish and the 1970 album Country Joe and The Fish's Greatest Hits.

== Original Woodstock festival poster ==
In 1969, Byrd created the original poster for Woodstock, but as the festival was subsequently moved and Byrd (then on vacation on the Caribbean island of Saint Martin) could not be reached, his original design went unused.

== Broadway posters ==
Byrd designed posters for notable stage musicals including Follies, Godspell, The Robber Bridegroom, The Grand Tour, The Survival of St. Joan, Jesus Christ Superstar, Little Shop of Horrors, and others. Byrd claimed that creating Broadway posters, compared to rock posters, was demanding work because he had to read the play's script to fully understand the poster he was crafting. By comparison, rock posters just had to be cool and psychedelic.

== Move to Los Angeles - Van Halen, Warner Bros. ==
In 1981, Byrd came to Los Angeles to work as the Art Director for the Fair Warning Tour for Van Halen. After that he did more poster creations in and around Los Angeles for, among others, The Mark Taper Forum, The Ahmanson Theatre, The Doolittle Theatre (in Hollywood, CA), and The Pasadena Playhouse.

From 1991 to 2002, Byrd was Senior Illustrator at Warner Brothers Creative Services, creating illustrations, backgrounds and style guides for all the Looney Tunes and Hanna–Barbera characters. His other tasks included working with writer J. K. Rowling on the first three books to make a visual cornerstone for the Harry Potter films that were to follow.

Unlike other artists, Byrd never considered commercial art to be "selling out" for money. "It's all art" he said in a Vanity Fair interview. "After all John Singer Sargent had to please the Astors. It's all a racket, kiddo."

== Gay advocacy and magazine design ==
In 1976, Byrd illustrated the cover of the first edition of Christopher Street Magazine, the first gay literary magazine. From 1984 to 1986, he was Art Director of the national gay news magazine The Advocate.

== Personal life and death ==
In 1985, David began Byrd/Beserra Studios, with his partner Jolino Beserra, a noted Mosaic Artist. The couple later married, and in 2024, moved to Albuquerque, New Mexico. Byrd died from pneumonia, as a complication of COVID-19, at an Albuquerque hospital on February 3, 2025, at the age of 83.

== Accolades and awards ==
In 1973, Byrd along with several other prominent illustrators, received a Grammy Award for the album packaging of the London Philharmonic Orchestra version of Tommy by the Who.

In 2007, the Ringling College of Art and Design presented a retrospective of Byrd's work.

Byrd's autobiography POSTER CHILD: The Psychedelic Art & Technicolor Life of David Edward Byrd, written with co-author Robert von Goeben, was released in 2023 by Abrams Books.
