= Michael Della Femina =

Actor, producer, restaurateur and founder of Storefront (born 1965)

Michael Thomas Della Femina (born June 18, 1965) is the founder of hybrid marketing and production studio StoreFront, as well as an actor, producer, and restaurateur.

== Early life ==
Della Femina was born and raised in New York City. He graduated from Quintano's High School for Young Professionals and attended The New School while studying acting with William Alderson - The Neighborhood Playhouse. Michael is the oldest son of advertising executive Jerry Della Femina and Barbara Rizzi.

== Career ==
=== Early career ===
Della Femina co-founded the acclaimed theater company SCRAP. They performed extensively in Los Angeles and New York in the late 80s and 90's to SRO crowds when they were coined “The Scrap Pack” by Interview Magazine and Della Femina part of Hollywood’s Next Generation by The New York Times alongside the likes of Robert Downey JR, Ben Stiller and Kiefer Sutherland. Della Femina's early stage work includes Cliford Odets Clash By Night at The All Seasons Theater in NY, Bent with Viggo Mortensen at The Coast Playhouse in LA and Rank and File at The Hudson Theater. Film work includes Italian Movie with James Gandolfini and Rita Moreno, A Gentleman's Game with Gary Sinise, City By The Sea with Robert De Niro and a series of B movies that Della Femina shot in Romania for Paramount's Full Moon including such classic fare as Mandroid, Bloodlust and Invisible the Chronicles of Benjamin Night.

Della Femina teamed up with director Jeff Joseph in 1998 to open up Fountain Films in Tribeca where they produced numerous shorts, feature films (A Dog's Life) and events including the Lime Rickey Film Festival.

In 2000 Della Femina and his wife Laurie opened the innovative boutique The Stork Club on Sullivan Street in New York City. Della Femina moved his film company into the back of the shop, naming it Storefront Films where he produced videos and branded internet content for local businesses.

In 2003 Della Femina worked closely with director Mark Ledzian and his production company N9 as their marketing director while also producing video, web content and commercials for advertising agencies, brands and internet channels.

In 2006 Della Femina started working with Brand Energy guru Matti Leshem and Leshem’s company Protagonist.

Looking for original, relevant ways to reach consumers, in 2007 Leshem and Della Femina opened the art gallery RetroNYM in New York City's SoHo as inspiration for Pepsi’s innovation team. In 2008 he started their hospitality division and ran The Thought Leader Campaign in New York and Los Angeles for another Protagonist client IZZE sparkling juice.

=== StoreFront ===
In 2010 Della Femina produced the new media show Pipeline and the TV pilot Downtown with Will McCormack. In 2011 he began working with Della Femina Advertising (DFA) under his own alternative marketing and production banner StoreFront Digital (StoreFront Productions) where they produced content, commercials and client presentations for brands i.e Drambuie, Frangelico, IceRocks, Fiat, Frederick Wildman, Zenify and Coney Island Beer.

In 2015 Della Femina Hospitality (DFH) was formed as a division of StoreFront to support their fast growing list of hospitality clients and projects including Haamonii Shochu, Long Island Spirits, The Allegria Hotel, Barbacoa, Blaze Pizza, Bloody Bills BBQ, SLATE pannini & martini lounge, Indo and the Croft Alley restaurants of which Della Femina is also a co-founder/owner. DFH is in development on numerous restaurant, bar and hotel projects slated for 2025.

StoreFront is currently in production on the comedy series "In The Weeds" and “Ivy League Crimelords” with Michael Mailer Films and Jon Friedman Productions and in post production on the independent feature Fishing In The Pool For Buddha.

StoreFront operates offices in New York City and Los Angeles.
