= William Schoell =

American novelist and film historian

William Schoell (pronounced /ʃoʊl/) is an American author, biographer and film historian, born in Manhattan and educated in Vermont, earning a B.A. from Castleton University. He has written several horror and suspense novels, such as Late at Night (1986) and Saurian (1988), as well as more recent forays into the genre, such as Monster World and Posthumous. He is a cult author, known as a master of pulp horror, whose prose is visceral, intense and engaging.

Schoell was the author of "Hidden Horrors," a column in the now defunct horror magazine The Scream Factory, now writes for Bare Bones magazine, and was a contributor of articles and reviews to periodicals including Writer, Writer's Digest, Paris Notes, Off Duty, Library Journal, and BBC Music. He was also a talk show radio host and producer. More recently, he has published books that deal with film, and biographies, some of which were written together with Hollywood biographer Lawrence J. Quirk, his domestic partner. His play Joe and Janice premiered at the American Theater of Actors in 2000. He writes a popular blog on movies called Great Old Movies as well as one on B movies, B Movie Nightmare. Prominent in the Gay Rights Movement in the 1970s and later, he formerly had a blog called "Ask Gay "Dr." Bill," which answered questions about gay life and the LGBT community. He has appeared on such television programs as "Hard Copy," "American Journal," and "Biography," and in the films "Dean Martin: The One and Only" and "Mineshaft: The Cruising Murders."

== Bibliography ==
=== Novels ===
- Things that Go Bump in the Night aka Spawn of Hell, Leisure Books (New York, NY), 1984.
- Shivers, Leisure Books (New York, NY), 1985.
- Late at Night, Leisure Books (New York, NY), 1986.
- Vicious aka Bride of Satan, Leisure Books (New York, NY), 1986.
- Saurian, Leisure Books (New York, NY), 1988.
- The Pact, St. Martin's (New York, NY), 1988.
- The Dragon, Leisure Books (New York, NY), 1989.
- Fatal Beauty, St. Martin's (New York, NY), 1990.
- Monster World, Matthews and Bates, 2015.
- The Absolutely Appalling Opera Murders, Comic Opera, 2015
- Mystery Zoo 1: Eye of the Cyclops, Funstuff, 2015
- Posthumous, Matthews and Bates, 2022
- Private Crimes, Comic Opera, 2022
- Hidden World, Raven Tale, 2025

=== Non-fiction ===
- Stay out of the Shower: Twenty-five Years of Shocker Films Beginning with "Psycho," Dembner (New York, NY), 1985, published as Stay out of the Shower: The Shocker Film Phenomenon, [London, England], 1988.
- Comic Book Heroes of the Screen, Carol Publishing (New York, NY), 1991.
- (With James Spencer) The Nightmare Never Ends: The Official History of Freddy Krueger and "The Nightmare on Elm Street" Films, Carol Publishing (New York, NY), 1992.
- The Films of Al Pacino, Carol Publishing (New York, NY), 1995.
- (With Lawrence J. Quirk) The Rat Pack: The Hey Hey Days of Frank and the Boys, Taylor Publishing (Dallas, TX), 1998.
- Magic Man: The Life and Films of Steven Spielberg, Tudor Publishers (Greensboro, NC), 1999.
- Martini Man: The Life of Dean Martin, Taylor Publishing (Dallas, TX), 1999.
- Heartbreaker: The Dorothy Dandridge Story, Avisson Press (Greensboro, NC), 2002.
- Joan Crawford: The Essential Biography, University Press of Kentucky (Lexington, KY), 2002.
- Remarkable Journeys: The Story of Jules Verne, Morgan Reynolds Pub. (Greensboro, NC), 2002.
- "I Can Do Anything": The Sammy Davis, Jr. Story, Avisson Press (Greensoro, NC), 2004.
- H. P. Lovecraft: Master of Weird Fiction, Morgan Reynolds (Greensboro, NC), 2004.
- Mystery and Terror: The Story of Edgar Allan Poe, Morgan Reynolds (Greensboro, NC), 2004.
- The Opera of the Twentieth Century, McFarland (Jefferson, NC), 2006.
- (with Lawrence J. Quirk) The Sundance Kid: An Unauthorized Biography of Robert Redford, Taylor Trade (New York), 2006.
- Giuseppe Verdi and Italian Opera, Morgan Reynolds (Greensboro, NC), 2007.
- Creature Features: Nature Turned Nasty in the Movies, McFarland (Jefferson, NC), 2008.
- The Silver Age of Comics, BearManor Media (Duncan, OK), 2010.
- The Horror Comics: Fiends, Freaks, and Fantastic Creatures, 1940s to 1980s, McFarland (Jefferson, NC), 2014.
- Superhuman: The Bronze Age of Comics, Timbre, 2016.
- Al Pacino: In Films and On Stage, McFarland Jefferson, NC), 2016.
- Superheroic: The Bronze Age of Comics Volume 2, Timbre, 2022.
- Super-Action: The Copper Age of DC Comics, BearManor Media 2024.
- Fantastic Adventures in the Comics: Rockets, Genies and Bug-Eyed Monsters, McFarland, 2025.
- Gods, Mutants and New Universes: Comics Books of the Eighties, Timbre 2026.
