= Richard Bright (actor) =

American actor

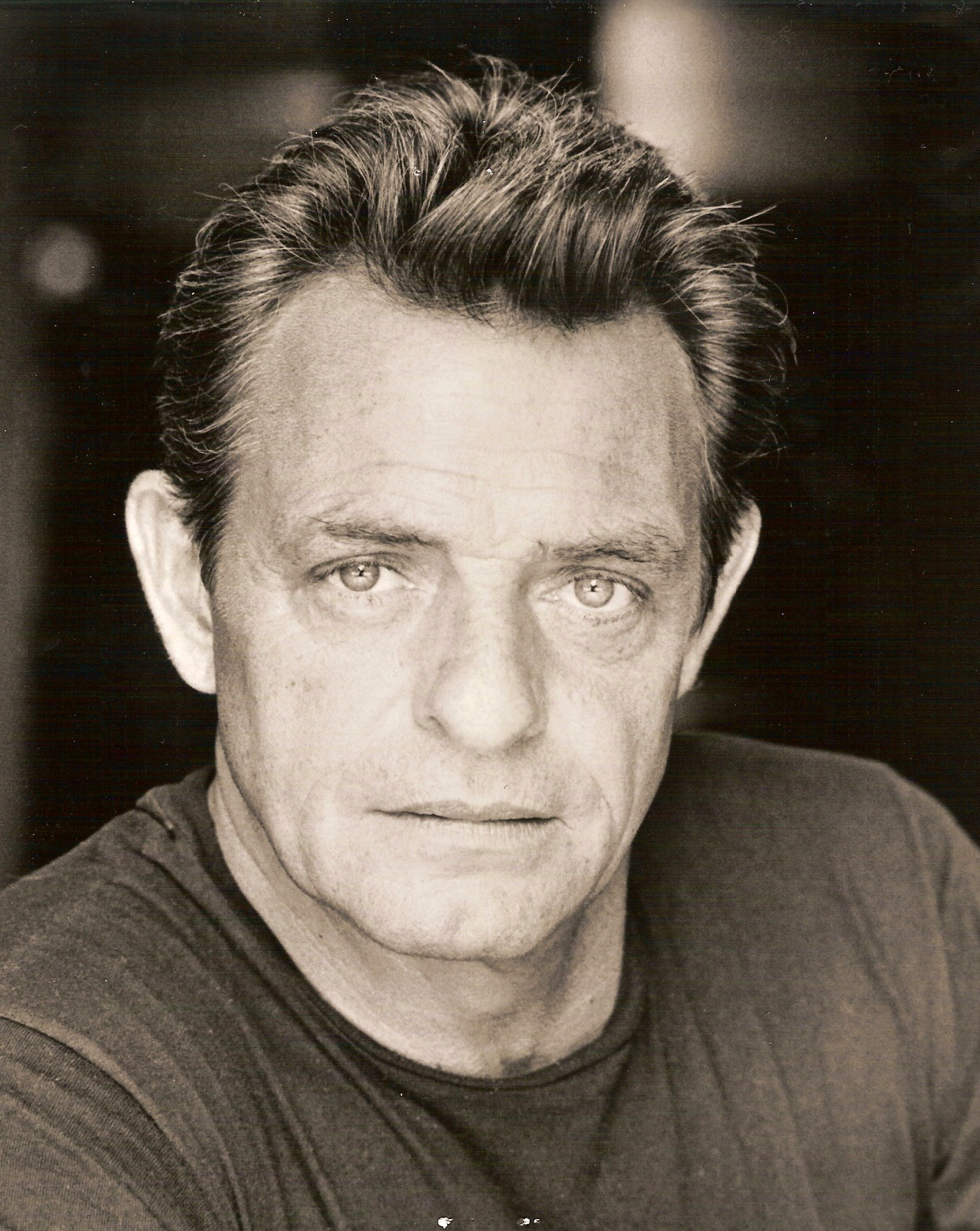
- Publicity photo of Bright
- Born: Richard James Bright; June 28, 1937; New York City, U.S.
- Died: February 18, 2006 (aged 68); New York City, U.S.
- Occupation: Actor
- Years active: 1957–2006
- Spouses: Elisa Granese (m. 1957–1960) Sue D Wallace (m. 1967) Rutanya Alda (m. 1977)
- Children: 2

Richard James Bright (June 28, 1937 – February 18, 2006) was an American actor, known for his role as Al Neri in the Godfather trilogy.

== Early life ==
Bright was born in Bay Ridge, Brooklyn, New York City, the son of Matilda (née Scott) and Ernest Bright, who was a shipbuilder.

== Career ==
Bright began his career doing live television in Manhattan at the age of 18, and made his film debut in Robert Wise's Odds Against Tomorrow (1959). He also worked on several movies early in his career with his friend Sam Peckinpah.

In 1965, Bright starred in poet Michael McClure's two-person show The Beard, performing first in San Francisco and later in Los Angeles, New York City, and London. The play involved simulated sex acts. Bright, the producer Robert Barrow and director Robert Gist were arrested in San Francisco and Los Angeles multiple times on charges of lewdness, before winning a restraining order halting the arrests. In granting the restraining order, the California Supreme Court ruled that the First Amendment protected live theatrical performances.

He had a supporting role in The Getaway (1972) as a con man who tries to ply his trade on Carol McCoy (Ali MacGraw), and co-starred in The Panic in Needle Park (1971), playing Hank, brother of Al Pacino's character.

In 1972, he appeared in Francis Ford Coppola's adaptation of The Godfather as Al Neri, Michael Corleone (Al Pacino)'s primary enforcer and bodyguard.

In the book, Neri's character is a former New York City police officer who is hung out to dry by the department after killing a sadistic pimp. Michael uses Corleone family influence to get him off the hook and draws Neri into his service. At the end of the first film, Neri, dressed as a police officer, murders rival mob boss Emilio Barzini and his henchmen during the film's baptism scene. Also, the last faces to be seen in The Godfather are Bright's and Diane Keaton's, as he closes Michael's office door in her face. Bright also played Neri in both sequels, thus becoming one of five actors to appear in all three Godfather films; his character murders Fredo Corleone (John Cazale) at the end of The Godfather Part II and the Vatican banker Archbishop Gilday at the end of The Godfather Part III.

Bright played another hired killer, Chicken Joe, in Sergio Leone's gangster epic Once Upon a Time in America (1984). His other roles include Pat Garrett and Billy the Kid (1973), Rancho Deluxe (1975), Marathon Man (1976), Looking for Mr. Goodbar (1977), the film adaptation of Hair (1979), Red Heat (1988), and Beautiful Girls (1996).

In 1993, he had a recurring role on One Life to Live as "Moose" Mulligan, rival and former underboss to longtime arch-villain and crime lord Carlo Hesser. In 1996, he appeared in the interactive movie Ripper.

Bright continued to make a number of both commercial and independent films, such as Jaded (1998). He also continued working on stage and in television, appearing on such shows as Law & Order, Oz, Third Watch, and The Sopranos. These later performances showed Bright using an oxygen tank in all these appearances (although he suffered from emphysema, the tanks were props for the characters).

== Death ==
Bright was struck and killed by a tour bus on the Upper West Side in Manhattan on February 18, 2006. He was hit by the rear wheel of the bus, and pronounced dead on arrival at Roosevelt Hospital. The driver claimed to have been unaware of the collision until he was notified upon reaching the Port Authority in midtown Manhattan, where he was interviewed by police. Ultimately, no criminal charges were filed, though the bus driver's license was suspended for failing to yield the right of way to Bright, who had been in a marked crosswalk with the walk sign on at the time he was struck. Bright was 68 years old, and was survived by his wife Rutanya Alda, son Jeremy, daughter Diane, and brother Charles.

== Filmography ==
=== Film ===
- 1958 Never Love a Stranger as Street Gang Tough Lookout (uncredited)
- 1959 Odds Against Tomorrow as "Coco"
- 1969 Lions Love as THE BEARD: Billy The Kid
- 1971 The Panic in Needle Park as Hank
- 1972 The Godfather as Al Neri
- 1972 The Getaway as The Thief
- 1973 Pat Garrett and Billy the Kid as Holly
- 1973 Black Harvest
- 1974 The Sugarland Express as Marvin Dybala (uncredited)
- 1974 Bring Me the Head of Alfredo Garcia as Bar Patron (uncredited)
- 1974 The Godfather Part II as Al Neri
- 1974 The Gun
- 1975 Rancho Deluxe as Burt
- 1976 Marathon Man as Karl
- 1977 Handle with Care as Jack a.k.a. "Smilin' Jack"
- 1977 Looking for Mr. Goodbar as George
- 1978 On the Yard as Nunn
- 1979 Hair as Fenton
- 1980 The Idolmaker as Uncle Tony
- 1982 Girls Nite Out as Detective Greenspan
- 1983 Vigilante as Burke
- 1983 Two of a Kind as Stuart
- 1984 Once Upon a Time in America as Joe a.k.a. "Chicken Joe"
- 1985 Crimewave as Officer Brennan
- 1985 Cut and Run as Bob Allo
- 1986 Penalty Phase as Judge Von Karman
- 1986 Brighton Beach Memoirs as Recruiting Sergeant
- 1987 The Verne Miller Story as Adam Richetti
- 1988 Time Out as The Sheriff
- 1988 Red Heat as Det. Sgt. Max Gallagher
- 1990 The Ambulance as McClosky
- 1990 The Godfather Part III as Al Neri
- 1993 Who's the Man? as Demetrius
- 1994 The Ref as Murray
- 1994 Who Do I Gotta Kill? as Belcher
- 1995 Pictures of Baby Jane Doe as Rudy
- 1995 Blue Funk as Father
- 1995 Sweet Nothing as Jack, the Cop
- 1996 Beautiful Girls as Dick Conway
- 1996 Night Falls on Manhattan as 64 Precinct Lieutenant
- 1997 The Hotel Manor Inn
- 1998 OK Garage as Louis
- 1998 Jaded as Zack Brown
- 1998 Anima as Tommy
- 1999 Joe the King as Roy
- 1999 Getting to Know You as Elderly Man
- 2000 The Photographer as Drunk in Bar
- 2000 Broke Even as Lazarus
- 2001 Trigger Happy as Quigley
- 2001 Dead Dog as Cunningham
- 2006 Day on Fire as Homeless Man (cameo, final film role)

=== Television ===
Richard Bright television credits
Year	Title	Role	Notes
1958	Studio One	Ditch	1 episode
1986	Hill Street Blues	Stubby	1 episode
1988	The Equalizer	Vegas	Episode: "No Place Like Home"
1988	The Equalizer	Gropman	Episode: "Splinters"
1998	Witness to the Mob	Joe "Old Man" Paruta	TV movie
2000	Oz	Detective Robert Stransky	1 episode
2002	The Sopranos	Frank Crisci	1 episode
1992	Law & Order	Albert Boxer	Episode: Episode: "Cradle to Grave"
1993	Law & Order	Mr. Quinn	Episode: "Black Tie"
1997	Law & Order	Victim's former Police Captain	Episode: "Working Mom"
1999	Third Watch	Drunk / Alchy Joe	2 episodes
2002	Law & Order	Dru Hunt	Episode: "True Crime"
2002	Law & Order: Criminal Intent	Frank Lowell	Episode: "Malignant"
2005	Law & Order: Special Victims Unit	Robert Sawyer	Episode: "Name"
