= Love and Pain and the Whole Damn Thing =

1973 film by Alan J. Pakula

- Directed by: Alan J. Pakula
- Written by: Alvin Sargent
- Produced by: Alan J. Pakula
- Starring: Maggie Smith; Timothy Bottoms
- Cinematography: Geoffrey Unsworth
- Edited by: Russell Lloyd
- Music by: Michael Small
- Distributed by: Columbia Pictures
- Release date: April 19, 1973
- Running time: 110 mins
- Country: United States
- Language: English

Love and Pain and the Whole Damn Thing is a 1973 American comedy-drama film directed by Alan J. Pakula. It is often categorized as a drama, but contains many comic elements. Maggie Smith and Timothy Bottoms star.

== Plot ==
Walter Elbertson is a young, shy asthmatic who lacks direction in his life and the confidence to tackle his future. His father, in an effort to instill some spirit into his son, sends him on a biking holiday in Spain. Walter goes to Spain but finds the bike riding torturous due to his asthma and lags behind the rest of the group.

Lila Fisher, meanwhile, is touring Spain by bus. She too is awkward with people and keeps to herself, and looks uncomfortable when a Spaniard tries to woo her with bird noises.

Soon the two tours coincide. Seeing the bus about to depart, Walter decides he has had enough of the bike and joins the bus tour. He ends up alongside Lila on the rear bus seat, wheezing terribly from having run for the bus.

The two begin spending time together out of necessity, but neither seems particularly confident in the growing relationship, Lila particularly. However, their similar dispositions soon bring them closer and they consummate their relationship. Not all goes smoothly, both expressing doubt of the other's loyalty. They make pledges of commitment to one another, increase their intimacy, and strengthen their bond.

Walter and Lila eventually decide to leave the bus tour behind. Walter hires a small caravan to take them around the country. At one point, they meet The Duke, who lives in a large Spanish castle, and seems to be very taken with Lila. This awakens jealousy in Walter, and for the first time he acts with strength and resolve to keep her with him.

Lila, who has shown signs of illness at various points along the way, confesses to Walter that she has not long to live. The two determine, with Walter as the main instigator, to spend her remaining days traveling together and following their hearts.

== Alternate title ==
Also known as The Widower (a working title in the U.S.)

== Cast ==
- Maggie Smith as Lila Fisher
- Timothy Bottoms as Walter Elbertson
- Don Jaime de Mora y Aragón as The Duke
- Charles Baxter as Dr. Elbertson
- Emiliano Redondo as the Spanish gentleman

== See also ==
- List of American films of 1973
