= Contact (Halo) =

- Halo episode
- Master Chief (played by Pablo Schreiber) takes off his helmet and reveals his face. This scene was subject to commentary amongst critics and controversy amongst fans.
- Episode no.: Season 1 Episode 1
- Directed by: Otto Bathurst
- Written by: Kyle Killen; Steven Kane
- Cinematography by: Karl Walter Lindenlaub
- Editing by: Aaron Marshall
- Original release date: March 24, 2022
- Running time: 59 minutes

Guest appearances
- Jamie Beamish as Kaidon; Burn Gorman as Vinsher Grath; Julian Bleach as Mercy; Ryan McParland as Adun; Jeong-hwan Kong as Jin Ha

Episode chronology
← Previous —	Next → "Unbound"

"Contact" is the series premiere of the American military science fiction television series Halo. Written by Kyle Killen and Steven Kane and directed by Otto Bathurst, the episode was released on the streaming service Paramount+ on March 24, 2022. In the episode, a rebellious settlement on the planet of Madrigal, occupied by the United Nations Space Command, is massacred by a group of Covenant, leaving only one survivor. Led by Master Chief Petty Officer John-117, a unit of Spartans deters the attack. Whilst investigating the origins of the invasion, John encounters an artifact that surfaces his suppressed childhood memories.

The series was first announced in May 2013, with development of it continuing for nearly a decade. During the development, the release target changed from Showtime to Paramount+. Upon release, "Contact" received a mixed response from critics, with praise towards the narrative established separately from the games, mixed opinions on the action scenes, and a negative response towards the quality of the episode's CGI animation. Additionally, a scene where the Master Chief removes his helmet and reveals his face—something that had never occurred in the games—prompted widespread discussion from critics and fans alike.

== Plot ==
In 2552, the United Nations Space Command (UNSC) is in state of war with the Covenant. On the planet Madrigal, a group of Covenant Elites emerge from a spacecraft near an Insurrectionist outpost and begin murdering all present in the area. As the battle ensues, the UNSC intervenes by deploying the Spartan-II unit Silver Team, led by Master Chief Petty Officer John-117. Silver Team defeats the Elites, but fails to prevent them from massacring the outpost's inhabitants, leaving a young girl named Kwan Ha as the only survivor.

After the battle, Silver Team investigates the Covenant landing site and discover a mysterious artifact inside. When John attempts to retrieve it, he experiences a sudden flashback to his youth, unlocking memories of his childhood; a surviving Covenant Elite witnesses this before fleeing from Madrigal. Afterwards, John splits from the rest of Silver Team and takes the artifact and the injured Kwan with him. Meanwhile, on Reach, Doctor Catherine Halsey witnesses Silver Team's discovery of the artifact via a video recording.

On High Charity, the Covenant capital, the surviving Elite reports his findings to the High Prophet of Mercy. As Halsey describes the artifact to other UNSC personnel, she clashes with Admiral Parangosky over her methods of developing technology and is instructed to stop the development of a new type of AI known as Cortana.

While on the ship with John, Kwan is contacted by UNSC Commander Miranda Keyes, who attempts to persuade her to join their side and send a message to the galaxy to warn of Covenant attacks. Kwan refuses to comply, due to her distaste for the UNSC; John is ordered to execute her. After he refuses to comply, oxygen supply is slowed down to both the ship and John's suit in order to kill Kwan and knock him out, though these efforts fail. As the ship is sent back to Reach, the UNSC military is sent in to neutralize John. After Kwan threatens John, he takes off his helmet in a bid to gain her trust.

As it lands, a large number of UNSC marines siege John's ship, ready to open fire. Instead of leaving the ship, John decides to interact with the artifact on board again, which generates enough power to disable power around the base and enable power on his ship. John and Kwan proceed to escape from Reach and fly into space.

== Production ==
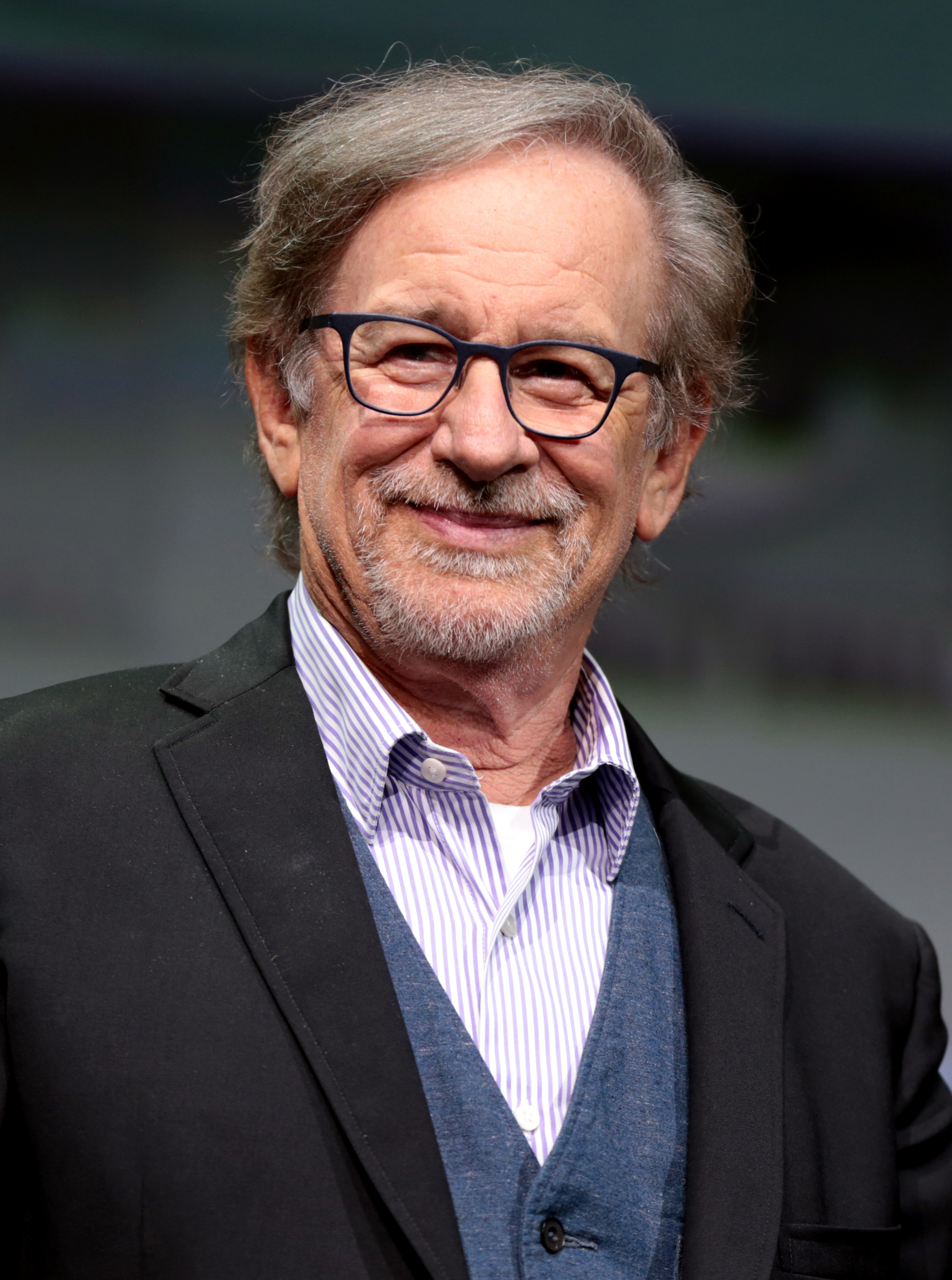
The series was produced by Steven Spielberg.

=== Development ===
A live-action TV series based on the Halo video game series was first announced in May 2013 alongside the Xbox One, with the initial details being that Steven Spielberg would be producing the series. In 2014, it was reported that the series would possibly premiere on Showtime shortly after the shutdown of Xbox Entertainment Studios. Active development of the series continued into 2015.

In June 2018, the series was announced for a second time, this time with a release confirmed to be on Showtime planned for early 2019. However, it failed to meet this schedule. Furthermore, as a result of the COVID-19 pandemic, production of the series was delayed after around fifty to sixty percent of the series had been filmed. Production resumed in November 2020. The series was primarily filmed in Budapest. In February 2021, it was announced that the series would instead be premiering exclusively on Paramount+.

=== Casting ===
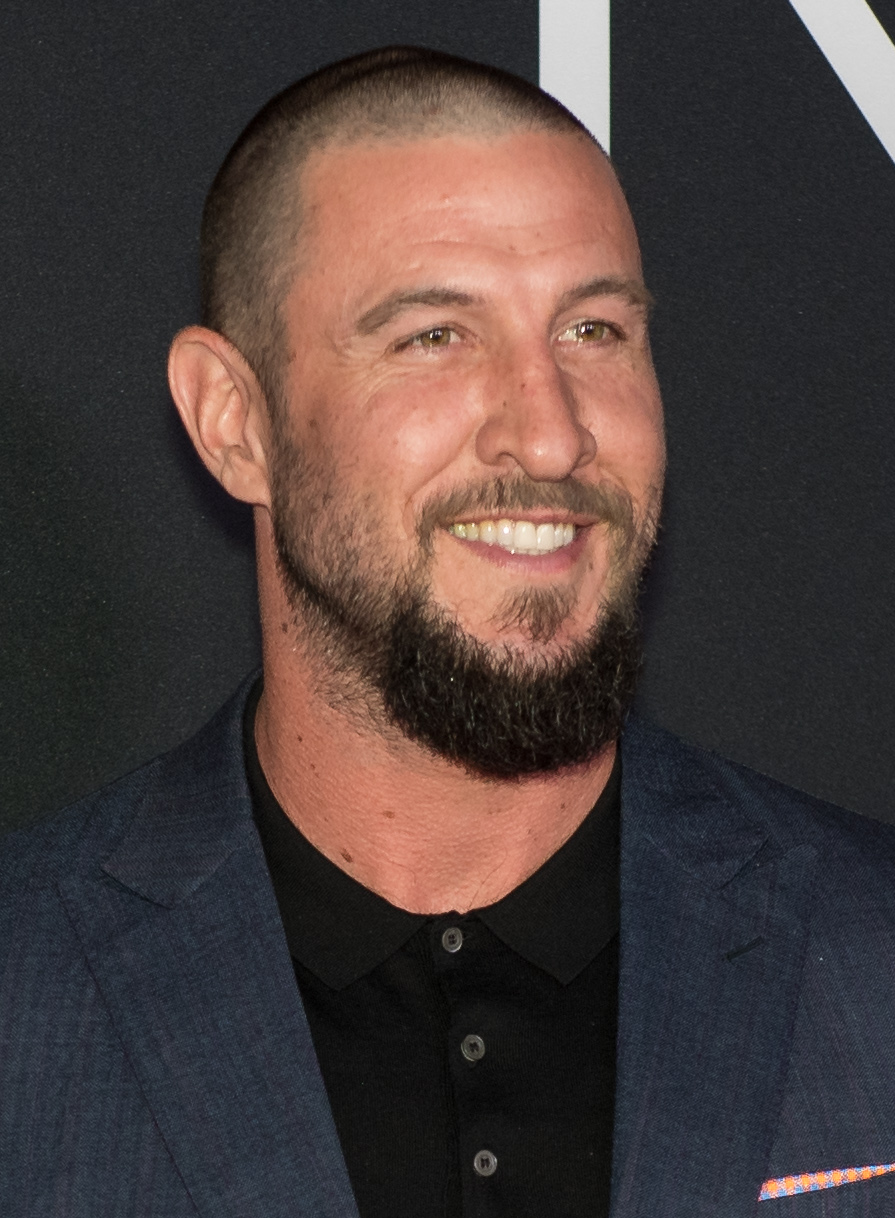
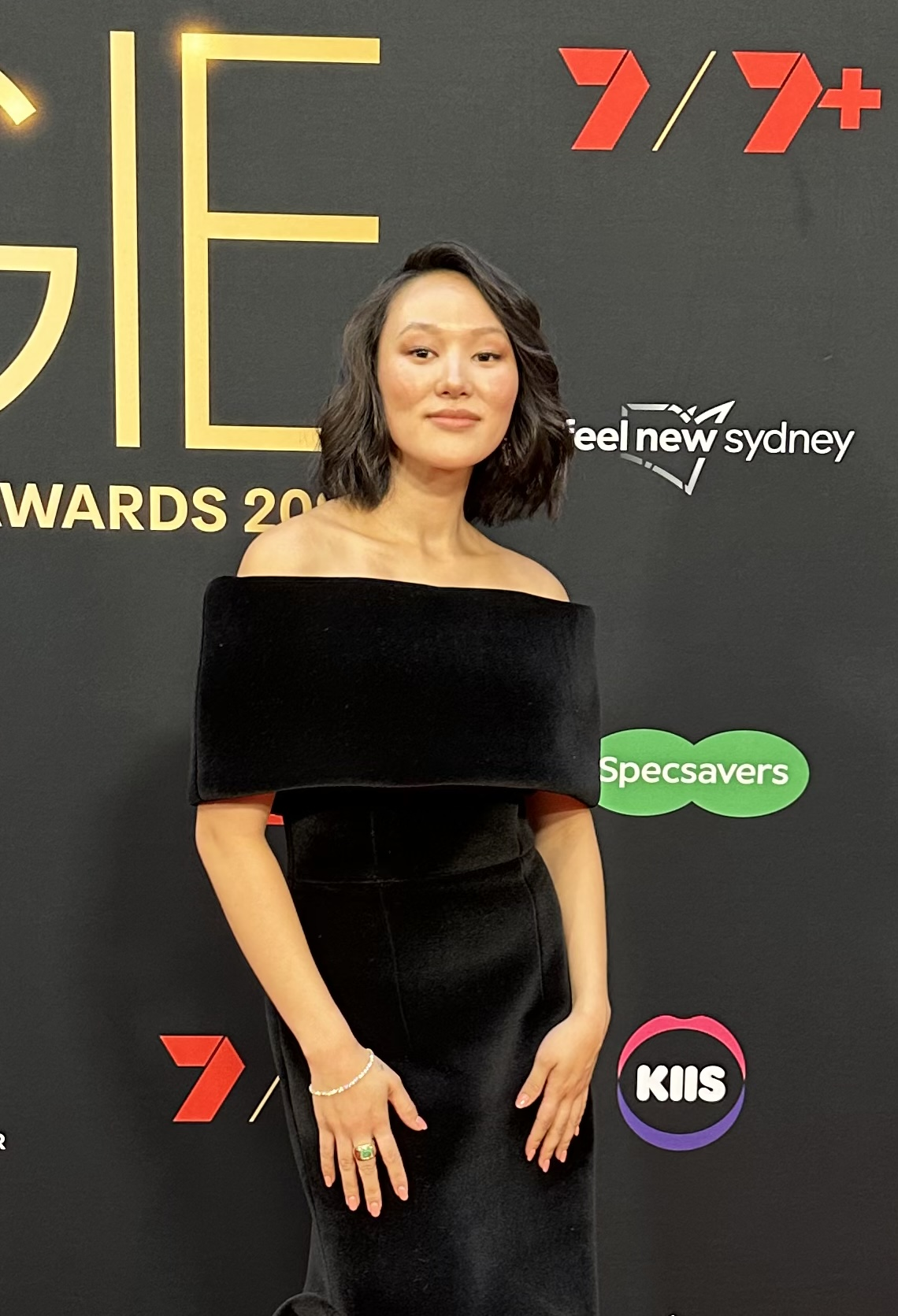
Pablo Schreiber (left) plays Master Chief, while Yerin Ha (right) plays Kwan Ha.

In April 2019, it was announced that Pablo Schreiber would assume the role of Master Chief, and that Yerin Ha would be playing Kwan Ha, a new character created for the TV series. In August of that year, it was announced that four additional characters were cast. These included Natascha McElhone as Dr. Catherine Halsey and Cortana, Bokeem Woodbine as Soren-066, and Shabana Azmi as Margaret Parangosky. In November 2020, due to difficulties related to COVID-19, Jen Taylor replaced McElhone's role as Cortana, in which she had previously played the character in the Halo video games.

Additionally, Danny Sapani portrays Jacob Keyes, and Olive Gray plays his daughter, Miranda Keyes. Ryan McParland and Jung Hwan Gong also make guest appearances in the episode.

=== Writing ===
During the production of the series, the writers chose to have a separate narrative from the games and tell a unique story that became known as the "Silver Timeline". This decision was made to build both stories without one contradicting or restricting the other. An example of a difference between the narrative established by the games and the Silver Timeline was Master Chief being the last Spartan during Halo: Combat Evolved (2001), while the TV series would feature Master Chief as the commander of a squad of Spartans known as the Silver Team. Comparing the two narratives further, Kenneth Peters of 343 Industries stated the games to focus on "shooting aliens in the face", whilst the TV series would focus more on the backstories of the Spartans, as well as the civilians under the rule of the UNSC and the Covenant.

An additional focus of the writing for the series was on Master Chief himself. Kiki Wolfkill of 343 Industries wrote that they "set out to tell a story about Master Chief—and specifically to tell a story about John", and to further explore his humanity, the writers made the decision to allow Master Chief to take off his helmet and reveal his face. This was noted to be something that had never occurred in the games over the past two decades.

=== Music ===
The musical score for the series' first season was composed by Sean Callery, whom had previously done work for series such as 24, Jessica Jones, and Homeland. Additional work was provided by Vincent Ségal, and singer Lisbeth Scott performed the opening of the "Halo theme" for the main theme of the series.

In February 2022, Eurogamer reported that the original composers of the Halo series, Martin O'Donnell and Michael Salvatori, filed a lawsuit against Microsoft in June 2020 over unpaid royalties dating back two decades. As a result of the unpaid royalties, the two also criticized the usage of the theme in marketing for the TV series, with them instructing their lawyers to look into the possibility of delaying the release of the show. The lawsuit was settled in April 2022.

== Release ==
"Contact" first premiered at the 2022 SXSW Film Festival on March 14, 2022, alongside the second episode in the series, "Unbound". The episode was released onto Paramount+ on March 22, 2022. Within the first 24 hours of release onto the service, "Contact" broke the record for the most viewed series premiere on the service, which was previous held by Yellowstone prequel 1883. On April 1, 2022, the episode was made available to watch for free on YouTube for a week. The episode, alongside all other episodes in the season, received a physical release onto DVD, Blu-ray, and Ultra HD Blu-ray on November 15, 2022.

== Reception ==
Ash Parrish of The Verge praised the writers decisions to create a narrative separate from that of the games, and the decision to focus on the backstory of the Spartans. Jesse Schedeen of IGN and Bradley Russel of GamesRadar+ shared similar opinions, with the latter describing the episode's writing as "fascinating take on the Halo universe". Furthermore, Samuel Tolbert of Windows Central summarized the article as a "great entry point into the Halo universe".

The episode's entertainment value received a mixed response, with criticism being primarily focused on the action scenes. Magnus Groth-Andersen of Gamereactor commented on the episode's lack of action scenes as being a "poor" adaptation of the video games and described the action scenes that were present to be "quite tedious". Megan Crouse of Den of Geek shared similar thoughts, writing that the series was off to a "dull start". Contrarily, Tolbert praised the episode's opening and summarized the episode as having "great action".

Additionally, several critics commented on the episode's CGI animation. Schedeen and Crouse both described the episode's CGI as "lackluster", and Charles Pulliam-Moore of The Verge described it as "terribly-rendered". Groth-Andersen echoed similar thoughts, describing it as "poorly rendered".

The decision to reveal Master Chief's face was widely discussed by critics and fans alike. In their review for the episode, Tolbert stated that, while they didn't "love the fact" that the Master Chief took his helmet off, they wrote the decision was necessary and described Master Chief as "a defined character in a show". Roger Cheng of CNET wrote the decision to reveal Master Chief's face as a defining part of the shows narrative that had never occurred in the games, and described Master Chief's "war-weary face, of a man questioning the military authority he's been raised to obey". Fans of the franchise, however, had a generally negative reaction to the scene, prompting Schreiber to comment on the scene, describing it to be "necessary" to understand the character.
