= The Abandons =

2025 American western-drama television series

- Genre: Western; Action drama
- Created by: Kurt Sutter
- Starring: Lena Headey; Gillian Anderson; Nick Robinson; Diana Silvers; Aisling Franciosi; Lucas Till; Lamar Johnson; Natalia del Riego
- Composer: Jeff Danna
- Country of origin: United States
- Original language: English
- No. of seasons: 1
- No. of episodes: 7

Production
- Executive producers: Kurt Sutter; Christopher Keyser; Jon Paré; Otto Bathurst; Stephen Surjik; Robert Askins; Emmy Grinwis
- Production location: Calgary, Alberta
- Running time: 35–52 minutes
- Production company: Sutter Ink

Original release
- Network: Netflix
- Release: December 4, 2025

The Abandons is an American Western drama television series created by Kurt Sutter. It premiered on December 4, 2025, on Netflix. In January 2026, the series was canceled after one season.

== Premise ==
In the 1850s during the Old West, Fiona Nolan, a devout Irish woman, and her found family of four adult orphans, find themselves struggling against the ruthless silver mine owner Constance Van Ness, who claims possession of their farm in the mining town of Angel's Ridge, located in the Washington Territory.

== Cast and characters ==
=== Main ===
- Lena Headey as Fiona Nolan
- Gillian Anderson as Constance Van Ness
- Nick Robinson as Elias Teller
- Diana Silvers as Dahlia Teller
- Aisling Franciosi as Trisha Van Ness
- Lucas Till as Garret Van Ness
- Lamar Johnson as Albert Mason
- Natalia del Riego as Lilla Belle

=== Recurring ===
- Clayton Cardenas as Quentin Serra
- Marc Menchaca as Sheriff Hayworth
- Brían F. O'Byrne as Walter Paxton
- Ryan Hurst as Miles Alderton
- Michael Greyeyes as Jack Cree
- Katelyn Wells as Samara Alderton
- Elle-Máijá Tailfeathers as Oma Serra
- Michael Ornstein as Issac Marstein
- Jonathan Koensgen as Joseph Langley
- Jack Doolan as Leslie Moran
- Michiel Huisman as Xavier Roache
- Haig Sutherland as Pastor Collier
- Sarah Grace White as Kiki

=== Guest ===
- Patton Oswalt as Mayor Victor Nibley
- Toby Hemingway as Willem Van Ness
- Timothy V. Murphy as Father Killian Duffy
- Amitai Marmorstein as the bear expert
- Kimberly Guerrero as the Cayuse interpreter
- Shaun Sipos as Corporal Grady Mitchell
- Marcuis W. Harris as John Bibb
- Natasha Mumba as Lucinda Burrell
- Phillip Garcia as Joaquin
- Katey Sagal as Madame Giselle (uncredited)

== Episodes ==
No.	Title	Directed by	Written by	Original release date
1	"Orphans"	Otto Bathurst	Kurt Sutter	December 4, 2025
2	"The Hunt"	Gwyneth Horder-Payton	Emmy Grinwis	December 4, 2025
3	"Triage"	Gwyneth Horder-Payton	Robert Askins	December 4, 2025
4	"Motherly Purpose"	Guy Ferland	Sarah McCarron	December 4, 2025
5	"The Joaquins"	Guy Ferland	Mary Kathryn Nagle & Ron Carlivati & Ryan Quan & Leon Hendrix III	December 4, 2025
6	"Piety and Rage"	Stephen Surjik	Denise Harkavy & Leon Hendrix III	December 4, 2025
7	"This Was Meant to be My Peace"	Otto Bathurst	Teleplay by : Kurt Sutter; Story by : Kurt Sutter and Emmy Grinwis	December 4, 2025

== Production ==
=== Conception ===
The Abandons was conceived by Kurt Sutter some time before the creation of Sons of Anarchy. The settings of the series was inspired around the origins of the American Mafia.

=== Development ===
On October 13, 2022, Netflix ordered The Abandons for ten one-hour episodes. Kurt Sutter, the creator of the show, also served as the showrunner and executive producer through his production banner, SutterInk. Alongside Sutter, Emmy Grinwis, Stephen Surjik, and Otto Bathurst were appointed as executive producers during an announcement on March 27, 2023. Bathurst and Surjik also served as series directors with the former directing its first episode. The following year on March 1, 2024, Jon Paré joined the production as series executive producer.

On January 21, 2026, Netflix canceled the series after one season.

=== Casting ===
On March 27, 2023, Lena Headey was unveiled as the leading character of the series. On June 28, 2023, Gillian Anderson was announced as a part of main cast. Lucas Till, Nick Robinson, Lamar Johnson, Diana Silvers, Aisling Franciosi, and Natalia del Riego were revealed to have joined the main cast on March 1, 2024. Three days later, Clayton Cardenas, long-time collaborator of Sutter, was revealed as a part of the recurring cast. More cast were announced about two weeks later with Patton Oswalt, Sarah Grace White, Michael Ornstein, Elle-Máijá Tailfeathers, Brían F. O'Byrne, Haig Sutherland, Jack Doolan, Jonathan Koensgen, Katelyn Wells, and Marc Menchaca all joining in recurring capacities. Additional casting were announced on April 4, 2024 with Ryan Hurst, Michael Greyeyes, Michiel Huisman, and Toby Hemingway joining the series in recurring roles.

=== Filming ===
Series filming began in Spring 2024, with Calgary, Alberta as one of its shooting locations. It was revealed on August 9, 2023 that the principal photography were delayed by a year due to ongoing union strikes at that time.

In October, Sutter left the show with a few weeks of shooting left. Sources said Sutter's departure came after Netflix saw rough cuts of the series' first episodes. The premiere was nearly feature-film length and was eventually split into two episodes, which necessitated additional scenes. Executive producer and director Otto Bathurst and co-EP Rob Askins were set to oversee the remainder of the shoot. Sutter and Netflix declined to comment. Gillian Anderson confirmed the end of filming at the end of October.

== Release ==
The series premiered on December 4, 2025, on Netflix.

== Reception ==
The review aggregator website Rotten Tomatoes reported a 30% approval rating based on 43 critic reviews. The website's critics consensus reads, "The Abandons may wield powerful lead performers, but the flimsiness of its characters, lack of originality, and ultimately fervorless material makes for a lackluster experience." Metacritic, which uses a weighted average, gave the series a score of 43 out of 100 based on 23 critics, indicating "mixed or average ".
