= Kate Kennedy (actress) =

British actress, writer and director

- Born: 1 April 1992 (age 34)
- Occupations: Actress, writer, and director
- Years active: 2014–present
- Height: 6 ft 3 in (1.91 m)

Kate Kennedy (born 1 April 1992) is a British actress, writer, and director. She is best known for her portrayal as Kai-125 in the Paramount+ series Halo, and has also done voice acting for video games such as Assassin's Creed Valhalla, in addition to other roles in film and television.

== Career ==
One of Kennedy's first major roles was in the show Hunch as the titular superhero, which was shown at the Edinburgh Festival Fringe in 2018, receiving mostly positive reviews. The skit was adapted to a short film in 2020.

Kennedy was first cast for the Halo series in 2019 as the Spartan super soldier Kai-125, portrayed as a teammate to Master Chief (John-117). Despite being a tall woman at 6 ft 3 in (1.91 m), Kennedy was still not tall enough to portray her character, as the Spartans are characterized as being around 7 feet (2.1 m) tall, requiring her to wear platforms inside her costume. Kennedy described the vigorous training needed to portray Kai as well as enjoying the character's arc, and mentioned that the armor designed for the Spartans actually protected her when she tripped on-set. Kennedy became a fan-favorite for her performance as Kai-125, with one review calling her character the "best part" of the series.

In addition to her film and television roles, Kennedy has also provided voice acting in video games, with her most notable role being Lady Eadwyn in Assassin's Creed Valhalla. She has also voiced Hela in Lego Marvel Super Heroes 2, among other roles.

== List of works ==
=== Film ===
Year	Title	Role	Notes
2014	Gregor	Girl	
2016	A Midsummer Night's Dream	Helena	Television film
2017	Damascene	Inez	
2018	Malcolm	Tam	Short film; also writer
2019	Dunk	Multiple roles	Short film; also writer
2020	Hunch	Hunch	Short film; also writer
2023	Haar	Jef	
2025	How to Train Your Dragon	Flatula	
2026	Truly Naked	Cecile	
TBA	Frank and Shell	Unknown	In post-production; Short film; writer and director

=== Television ===
Year	Title	Role	Notes
2015	Catastrophe	Waitress	1 episode (Series 1, episode 2)
2017	The Fear	Mo	Also writer
2019	Handy	Row	1 episode ("Pilot")
2022–2024	Halo	Kai-125	15 episodes

=== Video games ===
Year	Title	Role	Notes
2017	Mass Effect: Andromeda	Avela Kjar	Voice role
2017	Divinity: Original Sin II	Dwarves, Elves, Flaming Pig	Various voice roles
2017	Lego Marvel Super Heroes 2	Hela	Voice role
2018	World of Warcraft: Battle for Azeroth	Unknown	Voice role
2019	Anthem	Rythe	Voice role
2020	Assassin's Creed Valhalla	Lady Eadwyn	Voice role
2022	Valkyrie Elysium	Fenrir	Voice role, English edition
2023	De-Exit: Eternal Matters	Unknown	Voice role
2023	Lies of P	Laxasia the Complete	Voice role
TBA	Squadron 42	Various	In development; voice role

=== Stage ===
Year	Title	Role	Notes
2018	Hunch	Hunch	Also writer
