= Halo (TV series) =

American science fiction television series (2022–2024)

- Genre: Action-adventure; Drama; Military science fiction
- Based on: Halo by Bungie & 343 Industries (Note: The series was created by and developed by Bungie between 2001 and 2010. Subsequent entries of the franchise have been developed by 343 Industries since 2011.)
- Developed by: Kyle Killen; Steven Kane
- Showrunners: Kyle Killen; Steven Kane; David Wiener
- Starring: Pablo Schreiber; Shabana Azmi; Natasha Culzac; Olive Gray; Yerin Ha; Bentley Kalu; Kate Kennedy; Charlie Murphy; Danny Sapani; Jen Taylor; Bokeem Woodbine; Natascha McElhone; Joseph Morgan; Christina Bennington; Fiona O'Shaughnessy; Cristina Rodlo; Viktor Åkerblom; Tylan Bailey; Harry Lloyd
- Theme music composer: Bear McCreary; Martin O'Donnell (themes); Michael Salvatori (themes)
- Composers: Sean Callery; Sparks & Shadows
- Country of origin: United States
- Original language: English
- No. of seasons: 2
- No. of episodes: 17

Production
- Executive producers: Steven Spielberg; Steven Kane; Kiki Wolfkill; Frank O'Connor; Bonnie Ross; Justin Falvey; Darryl Frank; Otto Bathurst; Toby Leslie; Kyle Killen; Scott Pennington; David Wiener; Gian Paolo Varani
- Producers: Sheila Hockin; Charlotte Keating; Michael Armbruster; Sarah McCarron; Pablo Schreiber; Natascha McElhone; Nick Iannelli
- Cinematography: Karl Walter Lindenlaub; Eric Kress; Ed Wild; Carl Sundberg; Andrew Commis; Nicola Daley
- Editors: Aaron Marshall; Dan Briceno; Geoff Ashenhurst; Roderick Deogrades; Carmela Iandoli; Nicholas Wong
- Running time: 40–61 minutes
- Production companies: Showtime Networks; 343 Industries; Amblin Television; Chapter Eleven; One Big Picture; David Wiener
- Budget: $90–200 million

Original release
- Network: Paramount+
- Release: March 24, 2022 – March 21, 2024

Halo is an American military science fiction television series developed by Kyle Killen and Steven Kane for the streaming service Paramount+. Based on the video game franchise created by Bungie and developed by 343 Industries, the series follows a 26th-century war between the United Nations Space Command and the Covenant, a theocratic-military alliance of several alien races determined to eradicate humanity. Pablo Schreiber and Jen Taylor star as Master Chief Petty Officer John-117 and Cortana respectively; the latter reprises her voice role from the video game series.

Development for a Halo television series began in mid-2013. Killen and Kane serve as showrunners for the series' first season, which consists of nine episodes. Filming began in Ontario, Canada, in October 2019, although post-production for the first five episodes was affected due to the COVID-19 pandemic. Filming eventually resumed in Budapest, Hungary, in February 2021. In February 2022, ahead of its premiere, the series was renewed for a second season, set to be headed and executive produced by David Wiener. Filming for the second season began in September 2022, and wrapped in May 2023.

The first season of Halo premiered on March 24, 2022, and ran until May 19. It was met with mostly positive reviews from critics, with praise given for its action scenes, cast, and visual effects but criticism for its derivative writing and alterations from the source material. A second season premiered on February 8, 2024, and ran for eight episodes until March 21. It was met with positive reviews from critics, who declared it to be an improvement over the previous season. In July 2024, the series was canceled after two seasons.

== Premise ==
Halo is set in the 26th century and follows the conflict between humanity and a formidable alien alliance known as the Covenant. The story centers on Master Chief Petty Officer John-117, a super-soldier of the Spartan-II program, and several other major characters from the video games series.

Executive producer Kiki Wolfkill revealed that the series is a standalone story that takes place within its own "Silver Timeline" that is separate from and inspired by the core canon and lore of the transmedia franchise rather than a continuation, adaptation, prequel, or sequel, explaining that they wished to give the two Halo canons a chance to evolve individually to suit their media.

== Cast and characters ==
=== Main ===
- Pablo Schreiber as Master Chief Petty Officer John-117, a towering, genetically-engineered Spartan supersoldier and the leader of Silver Team.
  - Logan Shearer portrays a teenage John.
  - Casper Knopf portrays a child John.
- Shabana Azmi as Admiral Margaret Parangosky, the commander-in-chief of the Office of Naval Intelligence (ONI).
- Natasha Culzac as Riz-028, a Spartan member of Silver Team.
- Olive Gray as Commander Miranda Keyes, a UNSC (United Nations Space Command) officer and scientist and the daughter of Jacob Keyes and Catherine Halsey.
- Yerin Ha as Kwan Ha, an Insurrectionist teenager from the Outer Colony planet of Madrigal and Jin Ha's daughter
- Bentley Kalu as Vannak-134, a Spartan member of Silver Team.
- Kate Kennedy as Kai-125, a Spartan member of Silver Team.
- Charlie Murphy as Makee, a misanthropic human member of the Covenant who was raised by the Hierarchs as a "Blessed One".
  - Zazie Hayhurst portrays a young Makee.
- Danny Sapani as Captain Jacob Keyes, a seasoned UNSC officer and the father of Miranda Keyes.
- Jen Taylor and Christina Bennington (season 2) as Cortana, an artificial intelligence (AI) construct modeled on the brain of Dr. Halsey and implanted in the brain of Master Chief as a means of influencing his decisions. Taylor reprises her voice role from the Halo video game series and also provides motion capture for the character in the first season, while Bennington physically portrays the character in the second season.
- Bokeem Woodbine as Soren-066, a Spartan deserter who later became a pirate on the Rubble.
  - Jude Cudjoe portrays a teenage Soren.
- Natascha McElhone as Dr. Catherine Elizabeth Halsey, a scientist for the UNSC, the creator of the SPARTAN-II program, and the mother of Miranda Keyes. Her misanthropist views have her secretly striving to "improve" humanity by removing emotion – the source of venal, selfish actions.
  - McElhone also portrays two flash clones of Halsey.
- Joseph Morgan as Colonel James Ackerson (season 2), a formidable intelligence operative who has spent his career climbing the ranks of the UNSC's secretive Office of Naval Intelligence.
- Fiona O'Shaughnessy as Laera (season 2; guest season 1), Soren's wife.
- Cristina Rodlo as Talia Perez (season 2), a corporal specializing in linguistics for a UNSC Marine Corps communications unit before later joining the SPARTAN-III program.
- Viktor Åkerblom as Arbiter Var 'Gatanai (season 2), a high-ranking Elite who leads the Covenant's invasion of Reach. Åkerblom both voices and provides motion capture for the character.
- Tylan Bailey as Kessler (season 2; guest season 1), Soren's son.
- Harry Lloyd voices "The Monitor" (Note: The identity of the Monitor was undisclosed in the series; several sources have speculated that the Monitor is 343 Guilty Spark, the overseer of Halo Installation 04 in the Halo video game series.) (season 2), a Forerunner AI construct and the caretaker of Halo.

=== Recurring ===
- Burn Gorman as Vinsher Grath (season 1), a politician and UNSC collaborator who suppresses the Insurrectionist movement on Madrigal.
- Ryan McParland as Dr. Adun Saly (season 1), Dr. Halsey's assistant.
- The Hierarchs (season 1), the leaders of the Covenant High Council:
  - Julian Bleach voices the Prophet of Mercy.
  - Karl Johnson voices the Prophet of Truth.
  - Hilton McRae voices the Prophet of Regret.
- Sarah Ridgeway as John's mother (season 1)
- Duncan Pow as John's father (season 1)

=== Guest ===
- Jeong-hwan Kong as General Jin Ha (season 1), Kwan's father and an Insurrectionist leader on Madrigal.
- Sky Yang as Ruben (season 1), a young member of the Insurrectionists.
- Jamie Beamish as the motion capture model of:
  - The Kaidon (season 1), the Covenant Elite survivor of the Battle of Madrigal.
  - Uto 'Mdama (season 2), a Covenant Elite priest who serves under The Arbiter.
- Keir Dullea as Fleet Admiral Lord Terrence Hood (season 1), the commander-in-chief of UNSC FLEETCOM.
- Johann Myers as Reth (season 1), a former Covenant prisoner who had been driven insane.
- Yuna Shin as Soojin Ha (season 1), Kwan's aunt and a member of the Insurrectionists.
- Angie Cepeda as Violetta Franco (season 1), a bounty hunter hired by Vinsher.
- Josette Simon as Desiderata (season 1), the leader of the Mystics.
- Olwen Fouéré as The Mother (season 2), a shaman on the planet Sanctuary.
- Ivanno Jeremiah as Antares (season 2), the second-in-command of Soren's crew.
- Marvin Jones III as Louis-036 (season 2), Riz's personal trainer and a former Spartan who retired due to becoming blind.
- Christian Ochoa Lavernia as Danilo (season 2), Louis' husband.
- Bronte Carmichael as Julia (season 2), Ackerson's sister.
- Bill Paterson as Ackerson's father (season 2)
- Anna Koval as Captain Briggs (season 2), the leader of a UNSC black ops unit who reports to Ackerson.
- Dani Klupsch as Lieutenant Mullins (season 2), the team leader of Talia's squad of Spartan-IIIs.

== Episodes ==
Season	Episodes	Originally released	
Season	Episodes	First released	Last released
1	9	March 24, 2022	May 19, 2022
2	8	February 8, 2024	March 21, 2024

=== Season 1 (2022) ===
No. overall	No. in season	Title	Directed by	Written by	Original release date
1	1	"Contact"	Otto Bathurst	Kyle Killen and Steven Kane	March 24, 2022
In 2552, the Covenant attacks an Insurrectionist outpost on the planet Madrigal, massacring everyone except for teenager Kwan Ha before the Spartan-II unit Silver Team, led by Master Chief Petty Officer John-117, intervenes. In a nearby cave system, John discovers and retrieves a Forerunner keystone that reacts to his touch, displaying mysterious symbols and unlocking some of his sealed childhood memories. A surviving Covenant Elite witnesses this and reports it to the Prophet of Mercy at the Covenant capital, High Charity. On Reach, Dr. Catherine Halsey clashes with ONI Admiral Parangosky over her work on Cortana — a new type of AI based on Halsey's own brain patterns. After Kwan refuses to cooperate with the UNSC, John is ordered to execute her. He defies the order and rebels, earning Kwan's trust by taking off his armored helmet when she threatens him with his rifle. UNSC Captain Jacob Keyes orders John to be taken into custody; John touches the keystone again, which disables power in the base while also restoring power to his ship, allowing him and Kwan to escape. In the process, John discovers that he had drawn the keystone as a child, suggesting that he has a past connection to it.
2	2	"Unbound"	Otto Bathurst	Kyle Killen and Steven Kane	March 31, 2022
In a flashback, a young John catches Soren, a fellow Spartan, fleeing and allows him to escape. In the present, John takes Kwan and the keystone to the Rubble, an Insurrectionist base carved out of a series of broken asteroids. There, they reunite with Soren, who is now an Insurrectionist leader. On Reach, Halsey faces scrutiny over John's actions but promises a solution to the problem. Captain Keyes dispatches Silver Team to recover John, the keystone, and Kwan. On High Charity, the surviving Elite from Madrigal reveals to the Prophets and their ward, a human named Makee, that John activated the relic; despite hesitance from the Prophet of Mercy, Makee insists that she can recover the keystone herself. Back on the Rubble, Soren introduces John to Reth, a deranged hermit who was once held captive by the Covenant. Reth forces John to reveal his ability to activate the keystone and hints that it leads to an alien superweapon of unparalleled destructive power. Concerned by the possible threat to humanity, John leaves Kwan with Soren and surrenders to Silver Team, so he can brief the UNSC. He is consoled by Halsey, who promises a new beginning for him.
3	3	"Emergence"	Roel Reiné	Kyle Killen and Steven Kane	April 7, 2022
In a flashback, a young Makee is discovered and inadvertently rescued from torture by the Covenant whose Forerunner device reacts to her. In the present, Makee leads a raid on a UNSC corvette in an attempt to find the location of the Madrigal keystone. With the ship's data erased, Makee travels to Madrigal where the keystone was originally discovered; she leaves transmissions of her orders behind. On the Rubble, Kwan convinces Soren to take her to Madrigal to reunite with Insurrectionists loyal to her father in exchange for a payment of deuterium. On Reach, Parangosky orders Miranda Keyes to study the keystone behind Halsey's back. Halsey completes the procedure of creating the Cortana AI, using and killing a live clone of herself in the process, and places Cortana in John's brain via a neural implant. Cortana, able to communicate with John directly, and with others by creating a hologram of itself (based on an image of Halsey), follows Halsey's instructions to help John when he decides to remove a pellet that suppresses his emotions. After John explores some of the cityscape on Reach, he returns to base and touches the keystone again, where he has memories of his parents, his old home, and drawings of the Madrigal keystone and a complementary keystone. Convinced that the second keystone is located on his homeworld, Eridanus II, John, with his ever present Cortana, is joined by Halsey when he goes there to investigate.
4	4	"Homecoming"	Roel Reiné	Justine Juel Gillmer and Steven Kane	April 14, 2022
On Reach, Kai-125 follows John's example and removes her emotional suppressor pellet. When she helps Miranda analyze the Madrigal keystone, they discover that the keystone is related to a "Sacred Ring" that the Covenant call "Halo". On Madrigal, Kwan discovers her father's former allies refuse to help, fearing the Covenant and new UNSC-supported governor Vinsher Grath. Soren's ship is discovered and looted; Kwan goes to her aunt for help and learns of a mystical tribe that may have answers for her. Soren and Kwan escape Vinsher's troops and head for the spaceport to leave the planet. On Eridanus II, John, Halsey, and Cortana examine John's old home and find numerous drawings of the Forerunner keystones. After using Cortana to help recreate his home, John has memories of the location of the second keystone, but also his childhood and a visit from Halsey while his parents were alive.
5	5	"Reckoning"	Jonathan Liebesman	Richard E. Robbins and Steven Kane	April 21, 2022
On Madrigal, Soren ties up Kwan while he goes to find a way off the planet, but Kwan frees herself and steals Soren's pistol and vehicle. On Eridanus II, the UNSC is preparing to secure the keystone and take it back to Reach. As the UNSC is testing the keystone, it releases energy that alerts Makee and the Covenant to its location. As John continues to question his past, he touches the keystone and has clear memories of Halsey and ONI troops kidnapping him as a child and replacing him with a flash clone of himself; in a rage, he attempts to kill Halsey before Cortana disables him using their mental link. As John awakens and contemplates his newfound knowledge, a Covenant corvette arrives and launches a surprise attack. Despite the efforts of Silver Team, the UNSC suffer heavy casualties, Kai is severely wounded, and the Covenant successfully retrieve the Eridanus II keystone and withdraw. As the Covenant corvette escapes the planet, a drop pod containing Makee is left behind.
6	6	"Solace"	Jonathan Liebesman	Silka Luisa and Steven Kane	April 28, 2022
The surviving UNSC forces of the Eridanus II mission return to Reach. The UNSC takes Makee into their custody; although she claims to have been a prisoner of the Covenant, the UNSC does not trust her, considering that the Covenant are not known to take human prisoners. When John interrogates Makee, she reveals that they are both "blessed" with the ability to activate Forerunner technology. Makee says the likely location of the second keystone is a Covenant holy planet in the Aspero star system, named Raas Kkhotskha. Due to John and Kai's behavior following their removal of their emotional suppressors, Parangosky replaces Halsey as leader of all ongoing ONI projects with Miranda. John confronts Halsey and learns the true origins of the SPARTAN-II program: kidnapping and conscripting children to serve as supersoldiers, replacing them with terminally ill flash clones to alleviate suspicions, and subjecting them to augmentations with risk of deformation or death; John shares this with a recovering Kai. When John tests the Madrigal keystone once more, despite warnings of the possible ill effects it has on his health, he and Makee simultaneously have arrhythmias and seizures, while also sharing a vision of being on a Halo ringworld together.
7	7	"Inheritance"	Jessica Lowrey	Steven Kane	May 5, 2022
While Soren, having returned to the Rubble, engages in space piracy against the UNSC, Kwan ventures into the deserts of Madrigal to track down a reclusive tribe of mystic nomads, hoping for answers about her family's true purpose. The mystics reveal that when Kwan's ancestors settled on Madrigal, they were charged by a Forerunner AI with protecting a Forerunner portal that resides somewhere on the planet. After a vision directs Kwan back to her father's outpost, she is rejoined by Soren, who came back in order to fulfill his promise to John to look over her. The outpost is surrounded by Vinsher and his troops, who are looking to kill Kwan; despite being heavily outnumbered, Kwan insists upon fighting back. While Soren holds off Vinsher's forces, Kwan detonates the outpost's fuel supply using a gun that John had dropped during the fight with the attacking Covenant forces. The explosion kills Vinsher and his men; Kwan then pays Soren with money recovered from the outpost's supplies to honor their original deal. The two part on amicable terms, with Kwan determined to continue her mission and find the portal and take her position as its protector.
8	8	"Allegiance"	Jonathan Liebesman	Justine Juel Gillmer and Steven Kane	May 12, 2022
Following their shared visions of the Halo, John begins to view Makee as a potential ally, despite the continued doubts of the UNSC as to her loyalty. John learns the Covenant seek the Halo rings to begin their transcendent "Great Journey". John is able to convince the UNSC to let Makee test the keystone under Miranda's supervision. John and Makee have sex; noting John's kindness and similarity to her, Makee begins to reconsider her loyalties. Halsey initiates remote protocols that disable all comms within the UNSC base and places Spartans Riz and Vannak under her direct control, ordering them to capture John, Makee, and the keystone; Cortana chooses at the last second to warn John instead. Riz and Vannak restrain Kai and attempt to fight John, and Miranda uncovers transmissions of Makee leading the attack on the UNSC corvette. After UNSC troopers restrain and taser her, bringing back memories of her youth, she reaffirms her loyalty to the Covenant, frees herself, and touches the keystone, sending shockwaves throughout the UNSC base, before saying her goodbyes to John via another shared vision.
9	9	"Transcendence"	Jonathan Liebesman	Steven Kane	May 19, 2022
While Makee escapes Reach, Silver Team enters into a standoff that is only defused when Captain Keyes arrives and reveals to Vannak and Riz the truth about the SPARTAN-II program. Kai helps to apprehend Halsey, but Miranda realizes that the "Halsey" that was captured was actually a flash clone of the real Halsey, who secretly escaped from Reach. With Cortana's help, John deduces the location of Raas Kkhotskha and leads Silver Team there on a mission to recover the Forerunner keystones. On Raas Kkhotskha, Silver Team engages Covenant forces; when John is overwhelmed, Makee activates the combined keystones in order to generate a blast to save John, generating a star map leading to Halo, and inadvertently locking John into stasis. When John tries and fails to talk Makee down using another shared vision, Kai frees John from his trance by shooting Makee, shutting down the keystone before it can show Halo's location. After John takes a seemingly fatal hit, Cortana assumes control of John, rescues Silver Team, and escapes with them and both of the keystones. As they depart, Kai asks "John" if it is really him behind the helmet, but "he" only glances at her, wordlessly.

=== Season 2 (2024) ===
No. overall	No. in season	Title	Directed by	Written by	Original release date
10	1	"Sanctuary"	Debs Paterson	David Wiener	February 8, 2024
Following the raid on Raas Kkhotskha, John and Cortana are surgically separated. Six months later, Silver Team is sent on a mission to evacuate residents of the planet Sanctuary from the Covenant, who resist until the Covenant begin glassing the planet. After John rescues Corporal Talia Perez from a squad of Elites, Silver Team narrowly escapes the planet. On Reach, Silver Team meets ONI operative James Ackerson, Halsey's replacement in overseeing the SPARTAN-II program. Ackerson questions John about his experience on Sanctuary, expressing interest in Halsey's prior experiments on him and concern over lingering side effects from having Cortana implanted in his brain. After Ackerson seemingly dismisses John's concerns of the Covenant's changing strategies, John secretly meets with Parangosky, who states she was discharged from ONI after taking the fall from Halsey's scandals. Meanwhile, Soren takes interest in an indentured servant who claims to have seen Halsey. Ignoring the concerns of his wife, Laera, Soren purchases the servant's services in hope of capturing Halsey, but is instead led into a trap and arrested for piracy and treason. Having survived Madrigal's destruction by the Covenant, Kwan Ha befriends Soren's son, Kessler, and tells him stories about a monster.
11	2	"Sword"	Debs Paterson	Ahmadu Garba	February 8, 2024
On the Rubble, Kwan escapes the grasp of several slavers. Laera berates Soren's crew for leaving him behind and vows to find him. On Reach, as Cobalt Team, another Spartan fireteam, is sent on a mission in Silver Team's stead due to Ackerson's reluctance to trust the latter, John tells Kai that he saw Makee on Sanctuary and pushes Silver Team to train harder; this puts strain on Riz, who is recovering from injuries suffered on Raas Kkhotskha. Ackerson reveals to John that Perez did not corroborate his testimony of what happened on Sanctuary; John confronts Perez, who expresses survivor guilt and admits to not telling Ackerson the full truth. Ackerson, who is holding Halsey captive in a simulated room, uses Cortana to help deduce an impending threat. After Cobalt Team fails to return from their mission, John deduces that they were sent to Visegrád Relay, a communications tower on Reach. Convinced that the Covenant is on the planet, John gathers Silver Team and heads to Visegrád. Meanwhile, at SWORD Base, Arbiter Var 'Gatanai, accompanied by Makee, takes out a squad of UNSC marines and recovers the larger Forerunner keystone.
12	3	"Visegrad"	Craig Zisk	Marisha Mukerjee	February 15, 2024
At Visegrád Relay, Silver Team is detained by ONI operatives, despite John's insistence of Covenant activity. Admiral Jacob Keyes informs Silver Team that they are suspended from combat and that John is to undergo psychiatric evaluation. John escapes and meets with Parangosky, who warns him not to go against ONI. Realizing that Parangosky never left ONI, John departs to find Perez. Meanwhile, Kwan protects Laera and Kessler from Soren's mutinous crew, killing the latter when they threaten Laera, though Kessler is separated from them. Ackerson shows Keyes the bodies of Cobalt Team, who were killed by the Covenant on Reach. Furious at Ackerson and ONI for their cover-up, Keyes enacts the "Winter Contingency" of evacuating and defending Reach, against Ackerson's plan to transport "essential assets" away without informing the public of the planet's doom. Ackerson bids farewell to Halsey, who reveals that his sister, Julia, was a Spartan-II candidate but died during the augmentation process. Ackerson leaves Halsey with Soren, then helps his elderly father commit suicide to avoid capture before boarding a spacecraft. John finds Perez, who explains she has translated a message from Var 'Gatanai that announces the Covenant's intention to destroy Reach, before explosions rock the planet.
13	4	"Reach"	Craig Zisk	Tom Hemmings	February 22, 2024
The Covenant's invasion of Reach begins; John and Perez witness her family being killed by plasma bombardment. Halsey and Soren are freed from their cell when security for the ONI detention level deactivates. They find Cortana's containment room and witness Makee capturing the AI's data crystal. On their way to FLEETCOM HQ, John and Perez run into Riz, Louis and his spouse Danilo. Danilo is killed in the fighting and Louis sacrifices himself to destroy a Covenant Wraith attacking the group. The remaining survivors manage to reach FLEETCOM HQ, where Vannak reveals their Mjolnir armor was taken during Ackerson's evacuation and Kai is missing. Keyes informs John of High Command's intention to abandon Reach and the truth behind Cobalt Team's status at Visegrád Relay. Keyes leads Halsey and Soren to an evac shuttle, where Perez is helping civilians board. The hangar comes under attack, forcing Keyes to sacrifice himself to allow the shuttle to escape. Silver Team is ambushed by Covenant forces, led by Var 'Gatanai; John is wounded in the ensuing battle but is spared by Makee, who orders Var to not kill him. Vannak attempts to kill Var, but is impaled and killed by a Needler shard.
14	5	"Aleria"	Otto Bathurst	Basil Lee Kreimendahl	February 29, 2024
As Silver Team is cornered by a Brute Chieftain, Kwan and Laera arrive to rescue them, though Riz is severely wounded after she recovers Vannak's body. John witnesses Reach being glassed by the Covenant before falling unconscious. While unconscious, John remembers that Cortana agreed to do something for Parangosky in exchange for saving his life. Makee, now disillusioned with the Prophets, attempts to enlist Cortana and Var 'Gatanai to go rogue and find Halo themselves. While Cortana initially refuses, she secretly shows Var John's memory of his vision of Halo, convincing Var to change his mind. On Aleria, Halsey operates on Riz, but having suffered significant damage, Riz decides to stay behind and find a normal life. Soren and Laera seek out Kessler, only to discover that he was taken by the UNSC. After some initial disagreement between Kwan and John, a crematory funeral for Vannak is held. John swears to hunt down Parangosky and Ackerson, ignoring Halsey's request for him to focus on finding Halo instead. Kwan has a vision of the Sanctuary shaman, who ominously warns her that "the monster" is coming closer. On Onyx, Kai meets with Ackerson and prepares to lead a unit of Spartan-IIIs.
15	6	"Onyx"	Otto Bathurst	Sarah McCarron	March 7, 2024
John, Halsey, Soren, Laera, and Kwan land near ONI's secret headquarters on Onyx. John serves as a distraction, taking on ONI forces and willingly being captured before fighting through in an attempt to confront Parangosky; this allows Soren and Laera to search for Kessler at the ONI training facility. Kwan and Halsey enter a Forerunner cavern; at the end of the cavern, they run into science personnel led by Miranda Keyes. Meanwhile, Perez, now a trainee in the SPARTAN-III program, argues with Kai over their training simulation. Kai questions Ackerson about this, and he reveals the partial truth about Reach to her, but tells her John is working for the Covenant. Kai confronts John, who reveals their teammates' fates and ONI's attempts to sabotage them. Though John allows Kai to beat him up on Ackerson's orders, he reasons with her to reconsider ONI's narrative and go against Ackerson. Cortana contacts Parangosky and provides data on her location, and secretly leads John to the keystone still in UNSC hands. A Covenant priest, named Uto 'Mdama, detects Cortana's transmission and orders Var to execute Makee, but he and his loyalists slaughter 'Mdama's assembly instead, protecting Makee as she reaches for their captured keystone.
16	7	"Thermopylae"	Dennie Gordon	Ahmadu Garba	March 14, 2024
In a shared vision of Halo, John and Makee discuss their different beliefs. After being pulled away from the vision, Makee defeats Uto 'Mdama with the assistance of Cortana and determines Halo's coordinates using the stars present in the vision, while Kai helps John subdue the soldiers sent after him. Halsey, Miranda, and Kwan investigate the ancient ruins on Onyx, which Halsey believes were built by those who built Halo. Kwan unlocks a doorway into an ancient laboratory, where they discover the remains of a Forerunner scientist and a city before the three are forced to leave with a device containing the scientist's research; this helps Kwan realize that the monster in her visions is real. Soren locates Kessler but loses sight of him and Laera in a chaotic fistfight. Ackerson discovers that the true intent of the Spartan-III training simulation is to cause a nuclear reaction capable of destroying an entire star system and even Halo itself. He warns John and Kai about this; Kai decides to go with the Spartan-IIIs while John goes alone. Donning his armor, John reclaims Silver Team's Condor and travels to Halo's location, where the UNSC and the Covenant are engaged in combat.
17	8	"Halo"	Dennie Gordon	David Wiener	March 21, 2024
An overeager biologist inadvertently releases spores from the canister recovered by Halsey and Miranda, which quickly transform the base's personnel into zombie-like creatures. Parangosky and Halsey fall victim to it; Miranda freezes her mother in stasis to stop the infection from developing further, and promises that she will bring her back. Soren and Kwan rescue Laera, Kessler and, reluctantly, Ackerson after he saves Laera and Kessler, but Laera stays behind after becoming infected. As the group escapes, the shaman appears to Kwan and reveals the true nature of the monster in her visions as the parasitic Flood. John helps Kai and the Spartan-IIIs capture a Covenant Corvette, before boarding Makee's ship and rescuing Cortana just before it crashes on Halo. Kai destroys a Covenant Assault Carrier in a suicide run with the captured Corvette, allowing the UNSC to gain the upper hand. On Halo, John engages Var 'Gatanai in a sword duel, ultimately killing him. Makee reveals her intention to bring "peace" to the galaxy by using Halo to sterilize it, before entering a Forerunner structure. Later, John is interrogated by a Forerunner Monitor, who warns him that "it" is waiting for John deeper in the ring.

== Production ==
=== Development ===
The television series had gone through development hell with a planned release in 2015 that later changed to a 2019 release with Rupert Wyatt as director and executive producer, then a 2020 release; ultimately releasing in 2022 with Otto Bathurst replacing Wyatt in both roles.

In May 2013, Steven Spielberg was attached in executive producing a television series based on the video game franchise Halo, distributed by Xbox Entertainment Studios, with Spielberg's company Amblin Television involved. As of August 2015, the series had still been in active development.

On June 28, 2018, Showtime was given a 10-episode series order. Kyle Killen was set to be showrunner, writer and executive producer, while Rupert Wyatt was attached as director and executive producer. On August 12, it was announced that Master Chief would be the main lead of the series and that the series would tell a new story from the video games while respecting their canon at the same time. On December 3, Wyatt stepped down as director and EP due to scheduling conflicts. He was replaced by Otto Bathurst in February 2019, when it was reported that Bathurst would be directing the pilot along with several other episodes. It was also revealed that the episode count had decreased from 10 episodes to 9. In March 2019, Steven Kane was added as co-showrunner alongside Killen.

On February 24, 2021, the series was moved from Showtime to Paramount+. Showtime president Gary Levine said that the show was an outlier for the company's brand, and as a "big broad tentpole show" it was a better fit on Paramount's service. On June 25, 2021, it was reported that both Kane and Killen would be exiting as showrunners following the completion of season one. Killen had left prior to the start of production, due to him feeling like he wasn't able to fulfill the duties of showrunner, with Kane taking the reins as lead showrunner until post-production work had been completed. However, should the show get picked up for a second season, Kane would not return.

In January 2022, it was revealed by executive producer Justin Falvey that the show has potential to last multiple seasons and that David Wiener was being eyed as the showrunner for a potential season two, with Kane staying on board as a consultant. On February 15, 2022, ahead of its premiere, Paramount+ renewed the series for a second season, with Wiener set as showrunner and executive producer.

In July 2024, the series was canceled after two seasons, with the show's producers and the production companies 343 Industries and Amblin Television actively seeking a new home for a third season.

=== Casting ===
From April to August 2019, the cast for the series was announced, with Pablo Schreiber as Master Chief. He was joined by Yerin Ha, Natascha McElhone, Bokeem Woodbine, Shabana Azmi, Bentley Kalu, Natasha Culzac and Kate Kennedy. In November 2020, Jen Taylor replaced McElhone as Cortana. In September 2022, Joseph Morgan and Cristina Rodlo joined the cast, while Fiona O'Shaughnessy and Tylan Bailey were promoted to series regulars for the second season.

=== Filming ===
Principal photography commenced in October 2019. In 2019, the series spent over $40 million on production costs. The five filmed episodes were re-edited under the COVID-19 pandemic shutdown, with production on the sixth episode and reshoots being planned in Ontario, Canada. Filming eventually resumed fully in Budapest, Hungary in February 2021. The total production of the series including the post-production is estimated to cost between $90–200 million for the first season. Filming for the second season began on September 15, 2022 in Iceland, and wrapped on May 1, 2023.

=== Music ===
In February 2022, Sean Callery was revealed to be scoring the series' first season. In February 2024, it was revealed that Bear McCreary's production studio, Sparks & Shadows, would compose the music for the second season, with McCreary writing a new main title theme for the series that utilizes themes written by Martin O'Donnell and Michael Salvatori for the Halo video game series. A soundtrack album for the first season was released digitally in November 2024, more than two years after that season's release.

== Release ==
=== Marketing ===
The first trailer for the series debuted online during the 2022 AFC Championship Game, while also revealing the March release date. Tie-in content themed around the series was released for Halo Infinite on May 10, 2022 in the form of in-game cosmetics for the game's multiplayer component.

=== Broadcast ===
The first two episodes premiered ahead of release on March 14 at the 2022 SXSW Film Festival. The series then debuted on Paramount+ on March 24, 2022. The first episode set a record as Paramount+'s most-watched series premiere globally in its first 24 hours, though no exact viewership numbers were revealed. The first season overall was the second-most watched original series for Paramount+ as of June 2022. In the United Kingdom, the first episode of the series premiered on Channel 5 on June 22, 2022 to promote the launch of the Paramount+ streaming service in that country.

The second season premiered on February 8, 2024 with its first two episodes. Subsequent episodes were released weekly through March 21.

=== Home media ===
The first season of Halo was released digitally on November 7, 2022, and on 4K UHD Blu-ray, standard Blu-ray, and DVD on November 15, 2022. The second season of Halo was released on 4K UHD Blu-ray, standard Blu-ray, and DVD on July 23, 2024.

== Reception ==
Critical response of Halo
Season	Rotten Tomatoes	Metacritic
1	70% (71 reviews)	61 (20 reviews)
2	90% (21 reviews)	64 (8 reviews)

The review aggregator website Rotten Tomatoes reported an approval rating of 70%, with an average rating of 6.7/10, based on 71 reviews for the first season. The website's critics consensus reads: "Halo is too derivative of better science-fiction series to emerge a fully-formed elite, but glimmers of promise and faithfulness to the source material signal it's not out of the fight just yet."

On Metacritic, the show's first season has a weighted average score of 61 out of 100, based on 20 critic reviews, indicating "generally favorable reviews".

The second season holds a 90% approval rating on Rotten Tomatoes, with an average rating of 6.8/10, based on 21 reviews. The website's critics consensus reads: "Reloading on surer footing, Halo's streamlined second season is a leaner and meaner dose of sci-fi that comes closer to realizing the property's potential."

On Metacritic, the second season has a weighted average score of 64 out of 100, based on 8 critic reviews, indicating "generally favorable reviews".

Jesse Schedeen of IGN rated the first season a 7/10: "[It] is by no means a perfect adaptation of the beloved source material." He later clarified: "This is an adaptation willing to take some risks, and those risks tend to pay off."

Gene Park from the Washington Post criticized the writing behind Kwan Ha and described the sex scene between the Master Chief and Makee in the penultimate episode of the first season as "rushed". He stated that the series "has its greatest successes in vignettes of exciting tense and well-acted, well-directed drama, but rarely ever earning those best moments within the context of all it's trying to juggle." Todd Martens from The Los Angeles Times criticized the script for shifting from a character-driven narrative to a plot-driven one. Martens also felt that the series sacrificed some of the "silliness" from the games. Marcus Lehto, one of the co-creators of Halo: Combat Evolved (2001), stated that the show is "not the Halo I made", but later stated that he "never said [he] didn't like it".

The second season received a more positive reception from critics, with some declaring it to be a big improvement over the first season. Hayden Mears of IGN gave a 7/10 rating to the second season's first four episodes, stating that the season is "leagues more coherent and inspired than the first".

Master Chief has been described as acting out of character compared to his core canon counterpart, and Kwan Ha, an original character created for the Silver Timeline canon, has received negative reception due to her story being perceived as too "disjointed" and "divorced" from the main plotline of the series and the Halo universe.

=== Sex scene controversy ===
The sex scene between Master Chief/John and Makee, another major original character created for the Silver Timeline canon, in the eighth episode of the first season, has received a polarized reaction from audiences and critics alike. Discussions have included whether the scene was "contrived and forced", whether Master Chief commits a war crime by having sex with a prisoner of war who is unable to properly provide her consent, and whether this is atypical behavior of Master Chief in comparison to the core canon (this is the first time John has sex in either the core or Silver canons).

Kiki Wolfkill, the studio head of transmedia at 343 Industries and an executive producer of the show, defended the addition of the scene, stating that while the creative team had "a lot of conversation leading up to whether to do that or not and ... there's a lot of different opinions and voices", that the scene was necessary in order to humanize John by providing him with "a human connection with someone" in order to end the season with him as "a fully defined character".

Master Chief actor Pablo Schreiber, on the other hand, has described the inclusion of this scene as "a huge mistake", adding that he argued against it at the time but that his opinion was ignored.
