= Arbiter (Halo) =

Fictional character in the Halo video game series

- Halo character
- Arbiter Thel 'Vadam, as he appears in Halo 5: Guardians (2015)
- First game: Halo 2 (2004)
- Voiced by: Keith David (Halo 2, Halo 3, and Halo 5: Guardians); David Sobolov (Halo Wars); John Gremillion (Halo Legends); Ray Chase (Killer Instinct)
- Portrayed by: Viktor Åkerblom (TV series)

In the Halo universe, an Arbiter is a ceremonial, religious, and political rank bestowed upon Covenant Elites. In the 2004 video game Halo 2, the rank is given to a disgraced commander named Thel 'Vadam as a way to atone for his failures. Although the Arbiter is intended to die serving the Covenant leadership, the High Prophets, he survives his missions and the Prophets' subsequent betrayal of his kind. When he learns that the Prophets' plans would doom all sentient life in the galaxy, the Arbiter allies with the Covenant's enemies, humanity, in order to stop the ringworld Halo from being activated. The Arbiter is a playable character in Halo 2 and its 2007 sequel Halo 3. The character also appears in Halo 5: Guardians and additional expanded universe material. A different Arbiter, Ripa 'Moramee appears in the 2009 real-time strategy game Halo Wars, which takes place 20 years before the events of the main trilogy.

The appearance of the Arbiter in Halo 2 and the change in perspective from the main human protagonist Master Chief to a former enemy was a plot twist Halo developer Bungie kept highly secret. The character's name was changed from "Dervish" after concerns that the name reinforced a perceived United States-versus-Islam allegory in the game's plot. Actor Keith David lends his voice to the character in Halo 2, 3, and 5, while David Sobolov voices the Arbiter of Halo Wars.

The Arbiter has appeared as action figures and other collectibles and marketing, in addition to appearances in the games. Bungie intended the sudden point of view switch to a member of the Covenant as a plot twist that no one would have seen coming, but the character in particular and the humanization of the Covenant in general was not evenly received by critics and fans. Computer and Video Games derided the Arbiter's missions as some of the worst parts of Halo 2. Conversely, IGN lamented the loss of the Arbiter's story in Halo 3 and missed the added dimension the character provided to the story. Retrospective opinions have been more positive, with critics complimenting his distinction from Master Chief and his design.

== Character design ==
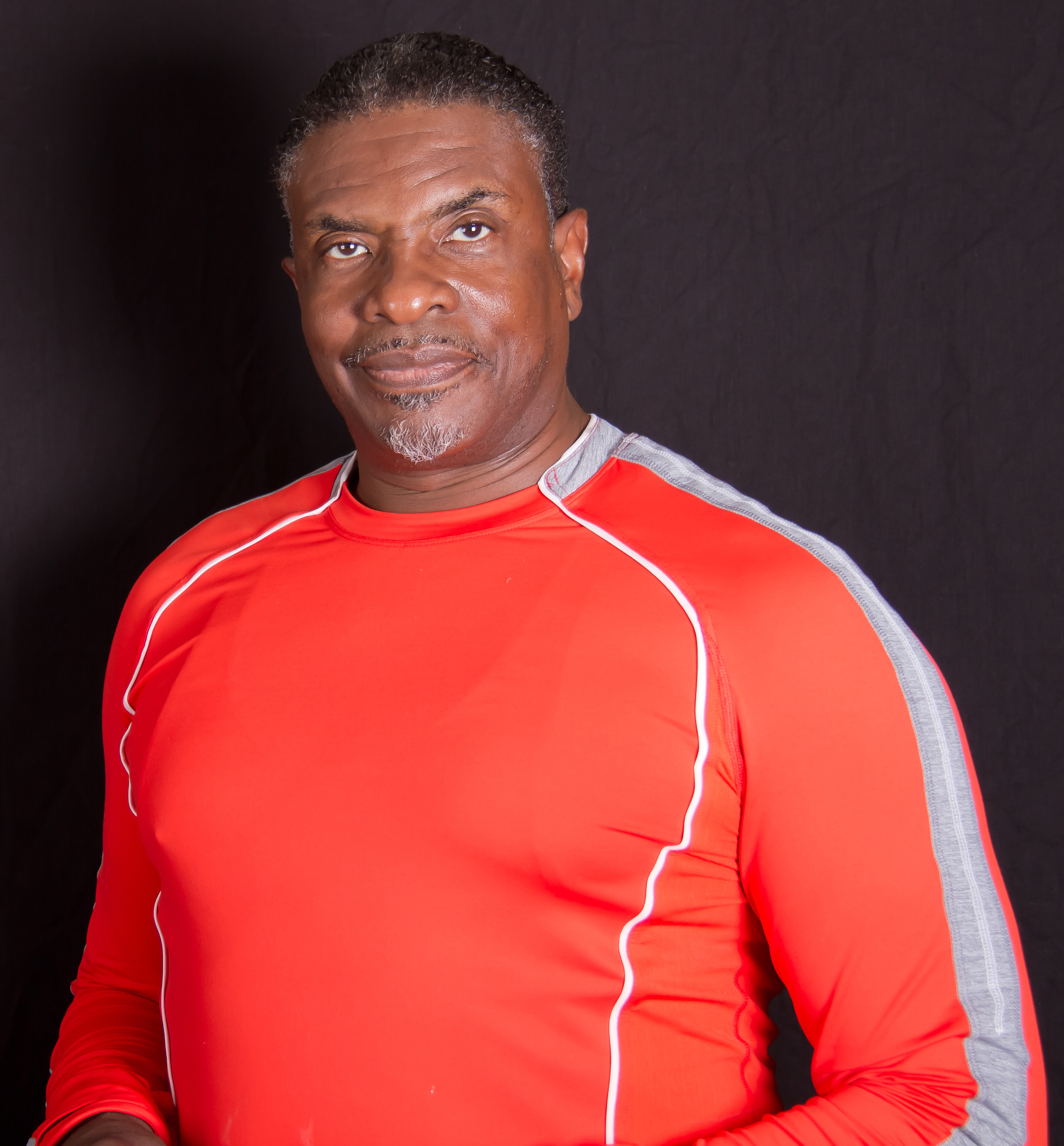
Keith David voiced Thel 'Vadam, the Arbiter of Halo 2, Halo 3 and Halo 5: Guardians.

The concept of the Arbiter came from early story discussions for Halo 2. Bungie designer Jaime Griesemer and story director Joseph Staten discussed playing from the perspective of an alien soldier to see the other side of the war between the human United Nations Space Command and alien Covenant. "What if you were the guy whose butt was on the line for protecting the most valuable religious object in the entire world, and you blew it?" said Staten. "That seems like a pretty interesting story, and one we should tell." Halo developer Bungie's former content manager Frank O'Connor said that the inclusion of the Arbiter as a playable character in Halo 2 was supposed to be a "secret on the scale of a Shyamalan plot twist" which Bungie kept the public uninformed until the game's release; O'Connor never included it in the weekly development updates posted at Bungie's website, and insisted story details about the Arbiter's past would remain mysterious. Staten said that the purpose of introducing the Arbiter was "to offer another, compelling point of view on a war where telling friend from foe wasn't always clear-cut. We knew we had a trilogy on our hands, so we were looking past the shock of playing as the enemy [to the events of Halo 3]". While there were those in Bungie who were against the Arbiter as a player character, Staten chalked its inclusion in the game to a combination of wearing down his opponents and the gameplay sandbox opportunities that came from having Covenant allies.

The Arbiter changed very little during development, as the overall appearance of the alien Covenant Elites (Sangheili) had been designed and developed for the previous game, 2001's Halo: Combat Evolved. The only substantial difference between the Arbiter and other Elites was special ceremonial armor, which appeared in early concept sketches as part of the character's final design. During Halo 2's early developmental stages the character's name was "Dervish", a name from the Sufi sect of Islam. Bungie picked the name because of its evocation of an otherworldly holy warrior. Out of context, Microsoft Game Studios' "geocultural review" consultants found nothing wrong with the name. However, as Tom Edwards, a consultant who worked with Microsoft during the review noted, "within the game's context this Islamic-related name of 'Dervish' set up a potentially problematic allegory related to Halo 2's plot—the [United States]-like forces (Master Chief/Sarge) versus Islam (the religious Covenant, which already had a 'Prophet of Truth' which is one title for Muhammad)". In the geopolitical reality after the September 11 attacks, sensitivity to the name remained high, and the character's name was changed. The switch came so late that the game's voice lines had to be re-recorded, and some game manuals were printed with the wrong name.

For Halo 5, the Arbiter's armor was redesigned, explained in-universe as a tribute to previous Arbiters and as a symbol of transition for the Elites. 343 Industries designed the armor to look "medieval" and antiquated, and incorporated brass and leather accents instead of something more futuristic.

The Arbiter in the main video games is voiced by American actor Keith David. David noted that he enjoys voicing complicated characters who have a past. To make an impact with voice acting, he said, is difficult—"it's either good acting or it's bad acting". David is not a frequent video game player, but stated in 2008 that he had become more known for his work as the Arbiter than for his other roles.

== Major appearances ==
Presented in Halo 2, the rank of "Arbiter" is bestowed upon a Covenant Elite by the Covenant leadership—the High Prophets—during a time of crisis; the position is typically given to shamed Elites as an opportunity to regain their honour prior to their deaths via suicide missions of importance to the Covenant. The Arbiter in the main Halo games is named Thel 'Vadamee. Previously a commander in the Covenant military, he is shamed for failing to stop the human soldier Master Chief from destroying the Forerunner ringworld Halo (as depicted during the events of Halo: Combat Evolved); the Covenant revere the Forerunners as gods and believe the rings are the key to the salvation central to their religion. Thel 'Vadamee is spared execution by the High Prophets and becomes the newest Arbiter. His first mission is to silence a renegade Elite who has been preaching that the Prophets have lied to the Covenant. The Arbiter is then sent to the newly discovered Delta Halo to retrieve the key necessary to activate the ring. Though he succeeds in his mission, the Arbiter is betrayed by the Brute Chieftain Tartarus; Tartarus reveals that the Prophets have ordered the replacement of the Elites with Brutes in the Covenant power structure. Though the Arbiter is believed dead, he and Master Chief are rescued by the parasitic Flood intelligence Gravemind. Gravemind reveals that the activation Halos are weapons of destruction, not salvation, and sends the Arbiter to stop Tartarus from activating the ring as the Covenant falls into civil war. In the process, the Arbiter and allied Elites forge an alliance with the humans Miranda Keyes and Avery Johnson. Together they kill Tartarus and stop the activation of Delta Halo, triggering a failsafe; the remaining Halo installations are put on standby from remote activation from a Forerunner installation known as the Ark. As a playable character, the Arbiter was identical to the Master Chief, save for the replacement of a flashlight with an active camouflage system.

While Thel 'Vadam remains a playable character in Halo 3 during cooperative gameplay (the second player in a game lobby controls him), the game's story never switches to the point of view of the character as in Halo 2. For much of Halo 3, the Arbiter assists human forces in their fight against hostile Covenant forces alongside Master Chief. They follow Covenant forces through a portal to the Ark, where the Arbiter kills the final surviving High Prophet. During the escape, the ship Arbiter and Master Chief are on is split in two; the Arbiter crashes safely to Earth while Master Chief is presumed lost. Novels and other works detail the Arbiter's efforts in the subsequent civil war that breaks out among the Sangheili.

Thel 'Vadam reappears in Halo 5: Guardians, where his forces, the Swords of Sangheilios, remain locked in combat with a faction of Covenant on Sanghelios. When a group of human soldiers travel to Sanghelios and rescues the Arbiter from attack, the Arbiter assists them in an assault on the final Covenant stronghold of Sunaion. After the human artificial intelligence Cortana begins subjugating the galaxy, the Arbiter and the Master Chief are finally reunited.

Taking place 20 years before the events of Halo: Combat Evolved, Ensemble Studio's Halo Wars (2009) features a different Arbiter from the character seen in the trilogy. Lead designer David Pottinger described Ensemble's Arbiter as a "mean guy. He's Darth Vader times ten." The characterization stemmed from a desire to make the Covenant more basically "evil" in order to provide a good-guy–bad-guy conflict. Parts of the Arbiter's backstory before the game's events are explained in a tie-in graphic novel, Halo Wars: Genesis.

=== Other appearances ===
An Arbiter is depicted in Halo Legends, a collection of anime short films developed between 343 Industries and numerous Japanese animation studios; "The Duel" shows how the position of Arbiter was stripped of its prestige and influence.

An Arbiter makes a non-canon appearance as a guest playable character in Killer Instinct: Season Three, voiced by Ray Chase. He uses several weapons from the Halo series in combat, and fights in the Arena of Judgment, a stage set in the midst of a battle on Sanghelios. According to franchise development director Frank O'Connor, this character is an "amalgam" of historical characters.

Thel 'Vadam also appears in several Halo novels, including Halo: First Strike and The Cole Protocol, the latter of which his name is first mentioned, which details his career before and during the events of Combat Evolved and Halo 2, prior to being named the Arbiter.

An Arbiter named Var 'Gatanai leads the Covenant's war against humanity in season two of the Halo TV series. In the season finale, he was defeated by the Master Chief in a vicious duel and then killed with his own energy sword by the Spartan.

== Cultural impact ==
=== Merchandise ===
Following the release of Halo 2, Joyride Studios released an Arbiter action figure. This particular model was reviewed by Armchair Empire's Aaron Simmer as a "great translation of the source material into plastic". Several models of the Arbiter are featured in the Halo ActionClix collectible game, produced as promotional material prior to the release of Halo 3. McFarlane Toys was given the task of developing a Halo 3 line of action figures, and a sculpt of the Arbiter was released in the second series of figures after the game's release in July 2008. A large-scale, non-articulated Arbiter figure was produced by McFarlane as part of the "Legendary Collection". Other Arbiter merchandise includes MegaConstrux toys and Funko Pops.

=== Critical reception ===
The initial reception of the Arbiter as a playable character in Halo 2 was mixed from fans and critics alike. O'Connor described the Arbiter as the most controversial character Bungie had ever created. Several publications enjoyed the added dimension to the Covenant by having the Arbiter as a playable character, and praised the added stealth gameplay and new story afforded by the character twist. Critics from The Artifice and The Escapist argued it was the Arbiter, not the Master Chief, who had a realized character arc in the game, and whose active participation made the ending of the game richer.

Alternatively, publications like GameSpot thought that while the Arbiter and Covenant side added "newfound complexity to the story", it distracted the player from Earth's fate. Reviewer Jarno Kokko said that while he did not personally dislike playing as the character, the idea of "people disliking the concept of playing on the other side in a game that is supposed to be the 'Master Chief blows up some alien scum' show" was a plausible complaint. Among some fans, the character was reviled. A panel of Halo 2 reviewers argued that though the decision to humanize the Covenant by the introduction of the Arbiter was welcome, the execution in-game was lacking; critics highlighted the perceived poor quality of the Arbiter's missions compared to those played as the Master Chief. Looking back at the game's release ten years later, Den of Geek described players as having a "love–hate relationship" with the character, and that the furor over the twist was only overshadowed because of the controversy of the game's cliffhanger ending.

The reception of the Arbiter's elimination as a main playable character in Halo 3 was similarly mixed. Hilary Goldstein of IGN decided the change took away the "intriguing side-story of the Arbiter and his Elites", in the process reducing the character's role to that of "a dude with a weird mandible and a cool sword". Likewise, Steve West of Cinemablend stated that the one important event in the game for the Arbiter would be lost on anyone for whom Halo 3 was their first game in the series. Goldstein took issue with the poor artificial intelligence of allies in the game and singled out the Arbiter in particular, describing the character as useless. The New York Times' Charles Herold found that in comparison to Halo 2, where the character played a central role, the Arbiter in Halo 3 was "extraneous". On the opposite end of the spectrum were reviewers like G4tv, who argued that the Arbiter was more likeable, not to mention more useful, as an AI sidekick instead of the main player. MSNBC rated the Arbiter one of game's top alien characters, and Comic Book Resources described the Arbiter's reception as a transition from divisive character to fan favorite.

Halo Wars's cinematics and voice acting were widely lauded, although one reviewer wrote that the characters were stereotypical and unlikeable. Dakota Grabowski of PlanetXbox360 considered the Arbiter the most confusing character in the game's story. Conversely, GamePro described the Arbiter as one of the best things about the game, saying that while it was a different character than the Arbiter seen in Halo 2 and Halo 3, he was "like an alien Jack Bauer amped up on drugs".

Despite the resistance to the character, Bungie staff defended the character's introduction. "I'd much rather experiment and do something surprising, and not have everybody appreciate it, than just turn the crank and do another alien war movie with a space marine," said Halo 2 design lead Jaime Griesemer. Community lead Brian Jarrard attributed some of the fan backlash to a discord between the game's marketing and the actual gameplay. "I think, even more so than playing as the Arbiter, the thing that people were disappointed with and angry about is that they were promised this experience, through the marketing, of being really backs against the wall, Earth's under siege, we're going to do all we can to save our home planet... In reality, the game only had two missions that actually did that." Referring to Halo 2's cliffhanger ending, Griesemer said, "I think if we'd been able to finish that last couple of missions and get you properly back on Earth, a lot of the reaction would have been placated."

Retrospective reviews on The Arbiter since Halo 2's release have been more positive. In 2021, a Polygon article stated "the Arbiter gives Master Chief a run for his money as "badass video game protagonist", and he does it in only six missions." A piece in The Escapist stated "Thel 'Vadam is the only character in the Halo games with a proper character arc" and "All told then, more than 15 years after his introduction, the Arbiter continues to hold an uneasy but influential place in the Halo franchise. When he was introduced, he expanded the series's scope with grand narrative ambition but some frustrating gameplay choices. When he was mothballed, that ambition seemed to leave with him."
