= Pablo Schreiber =

Canadian and American actor (born 1978)

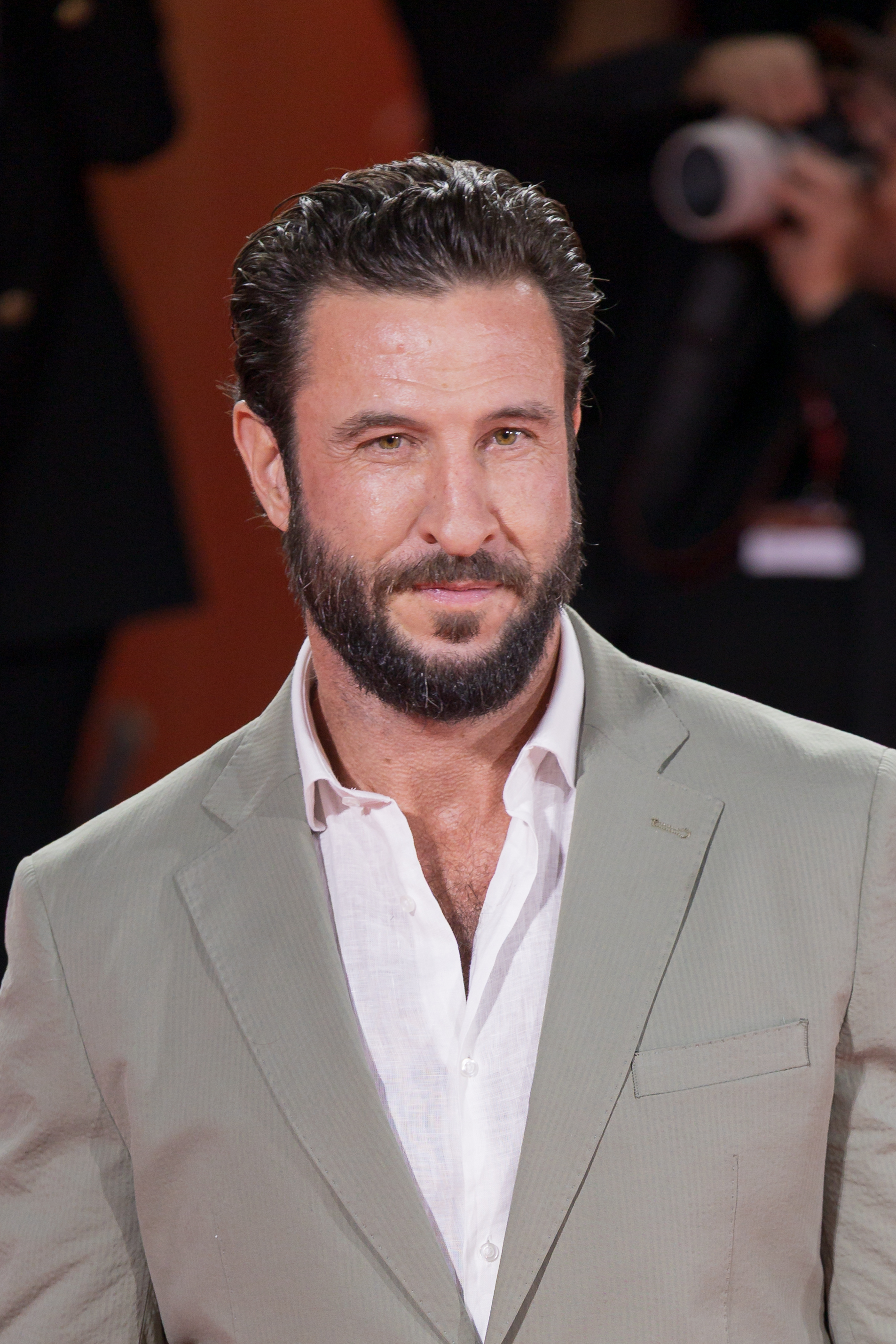
- Schreiber in 2025
- Born: Pablo Tell Schreiber; April 26, 1978 (age 48); Ymir, British Columbia, Canada
- Citizenship: Canada; United States
- Education: Carnegie Mellon University (BFA)
- Occupation: Actor
- Years active: 2001–present
- Spouse: Jessica Monty (m. 2007; div. 2014)
- Children: 2
- Relatives: Liev Schreiber (half-brother)

Pablo Tell Schreiber (born April 26, 1978) is a Canadian and American actor. He is best known for his stage work and for portraying Nick Sobotka on The Wire (2003, 2008), William Lewis on Law & Order: Special Victims Unit (2013–2014), Mad Sweeney on the Starz series American Gods (2017–2021), and as George "Pornstache" Mendez on Orange Is the New Black (2013–2017), for which he received a Primetime Emmy nomination for Outstanding Guest Actor in a Drama Series. He starred as the Master Chief in the Paramount+ live-action series Halo (2022–2024) which is based on the franchise of the same name.

His film roles include minor roles in Bubble Boy (2001), The Manchurian Candidate (2004), Lords of Dogtown (2005), Vicky Cristina Barcelona (2008), Nights in Rodanthe (2008), Allegiance (2012), and Preservation (2014). He co-starred in the 2016 war film 13 Hours: The Secret Soldiers of Benghazi directed by Michael Bay. In 2018, he starred in the action heist film Den of Thieves opposite Gerard Butler and in Skyscraper with Dwayne Johnson. In 2020, he starred in the drama film Lorelei with Jena Malone.

He is also known for his dramatic stage work including his performance in Awake and Sing! (2006) on Broadway which earned him a nomination for a Tony Award. In 2008, he starred in reasons to be pretty where he won the 2009 Drama Desk Award for Outstanding Featured Actor in a Play. He narrated the audiobook version of Brett Easton Ellis’ American Psycho.

== Early life ==
Schreiber was born to Tell Carroll Schreiber (1941–2021), an American actor, and Lorraine Reaveley, a Canadian psychotherapist who practises body-based psychotherapy. (Note: Body-based psychotherapy is an approach that emphasizes the relationship between bodily experience and psychological processes.) He was born in an intentional community in Ymir, British Columbia, and at six months of age moved with his family to the unincorporated rural community of Winlaw, British Columbia. His older paternal half-brother is actor Liev Schreiber.

Schreiber's father, who had a strong interest in literature, named him after the Chilean poet Pablo Neruda. His parents separated when he was 12, and he moved to Seattle with his father.

After graduating from high school, Schreiber enrolled at the University of San Francisco and sought to play on the university's basketball team. He later transferred to Carnegie Mellon University in Pittsburgh and graduated in 2000 with a degree in theatre.

== Career ==
=== Television ===
Schreiber's first television appearance was as Nick Sobotka in season 2 of the critically acclaimed HBO series The Wire (2003). After his final appearance in the last episode of season 2, he also made a cameo appearance in the season 5 episode "The Dickensian Aspect". He went on to play minor roles in the series Law & Order: Criminal Intent and Law & Order before playing the recurring guest role of serial rapist William Lewis on Law & Order: Special Victims Unit. He appeared in an eight episode arc playing the antagonist to protagonist Olivia Benson (Mariska Hargitay).

From 2008 to 2009, he appeared in multiple series including Dirt, Army Wives, The Beast, Numbers, and It's Always Sunny in Philadelphia. In 2011, he was cast as Johnny Leary in the FX series Lights Out which only aired for one season. From 2011 to 2012, he played both Demetri Ravitch in the Showtime series Weeds and Anton Little Creek on the show A Gifted Man. BuddyTV ranked him #77 on its list of "TV's Sexiest Men of 2011".

In October 2012, Schreiber was cast in the recurring role of George "Pornstache" Mendez on the Netflix original drama series Orange Is the New Black. For his role on the show, he won the "We Love to Hate You Award" at the 2014 Young Hollywood Awards and received a Primetime Emmy nomination for Outstanding Guest Actor in a Drama Series in 2015. He played the role from 2013 to 2017 and had a guest appearance in a 2019 episode.

In February 2013, he co-starred as Virgil in NBC's drama pilot Ironside, a reboot of the 1967 series of the same name. However ratings and reviews were unfavourable and it was canceled after only four episodes had aired.

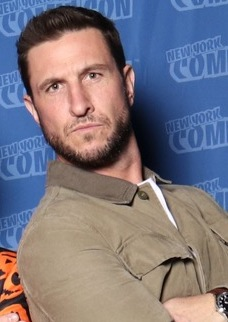
Schreiber at New York Comic Con in October 2017

Schreiber was cast as Mad Sweeney in the 2017 Starz series American Gods, based on the novel of the same name written by Neil Gaiman. His character is a self-described leprechaun unwillingly endebted to Mr. Wednesday, played by Ian McShane. By the end of season 2, Sweeney remembers that he is Buile Shuibhne, the king of the Dál nAraidi driven insane by the curse of Saint Rónán Finn. Schreiber appears in seasons 1 and 2 with flashback appearances in the third and final season. His character became a favourite of viewers during the series.

In April 2019, he was cast as Master Chief / John-117 in the Halo live-action series, based on the video game franchise of the same name. The series was released on March 24, 2022, by Paramount+ and has received mostly positive reviews with 71% on Rotten Tomatoes. To prepare for his role in the series, Schreiber worked with a trainer and a chef to bulk up adding muscle to play the supersoldier. Paramount confirmed that the series was renewed for season 2 with Schreiber reprising the main role of Master Chief.

Schreiber co-starred in the biographical crime drama streaming television miniseries Candy as Allan Gore, opposite Jessica Biel's character, Candy Montgomery. It is based on the true story of how Candy Montgomery was accused of the axe murder of her neighbour, Betty Gore in 1980 in Texas. The series premiered May 9, 2022, with the last episodes airing on May 13, 2022.

=== Film ===
Schreiber's first film was a minor role in the 2001 American black comedy film Bubble Boy. He appeared in the 2004 film The Manchurian Candidate which starred his half-brother Liev Schreiber. He had supporting roles in the films Lords of Dogtown (2005), Vicky Cristina Barcelona (2008), Nights in Rodanthe (2008), and Happythankyoumoreplease (2010). In 2016, he co-starred as Kris "Tanto" Paronto, GRS team member and former U.S. Army Ranger in the American biographical war film 13 Hours: The Secret Soldiers of Benghazi, opposite John Krasinski and James Badge Dale. The film was directed and co-produced by Michael Bay, written by Chuck Hogan, and is based on Mitchell Zuckoff's 2014 book of the same name.

In 2018, he starred in the American action heist film Den of Thieves with Gerard Butler. He played Ray Merrimen, a MARSOC Marine veteran who is the crew's leader and schemer, and one of the robbers who sets out to rob the Federal Reserve Bank of downtown Los Angeles. Schreiber underwent extensive military training for his role in the film, saying "... with the weapons training, we had extensive military movement, team movement, weapons training boot camp, a couple of weeks before we started shooting". In the same year he co-starred with Dwayne Johnson in the action thriller film Skyscraper. He played the role of American astronaut Jim Lovell in the biographical drama First Man which was also released in 2018.

Schreiber starred in the 2021 drama film Lorelei with Jena Malone. It received mostly positive reviews from critics. Brian Tallerico from RogerEbert.com said of Schreiber, "Schreiber uses his massive size in an interesting way in that he’s such an imposing figure but he allows himself to also be fascinatingly vulnerable at the same time... He has remarkable range".

=== Theatre ===
Schreiber's stage work includes both Broadway and off-Broadway plays. In 2006, he starred in the Broadway play Awake and Sing!, earning him a nomination for a Tony Award for Best Featured Actor in a Play. He also starred in the 2008 Broadway play reasons to be pretty with Piper Perabo and Alison Pill. For that role he won the 2009 Drama Desk Award for Outstanding Featured Actor in a Play. He played Eben in the 2009 play Desire Under the Elms opposite Carla Gugino's Abbie. In 2011, Schreiber starred in the Off-Broadway play Gruesome Playground Injuries at Second Stage Theatre.

== Personal life ==
Schreiber married yoga teacher Jessica Monty in 2007. They have two sons together, born in 2009 and 2012. She filed for divorce in 2014, citing irreconcilable differences.

== Filmography ==
=== Film ===
Year	Title	Role	Notes
2001	Bubble Boy	Todd	
2003	The Mudge Boy	Brent	
2004	The Manchurian Candidate	Eddie Ingram	
2004	Invitation to a Suicide	Kazimierz "Kaz" Malek	
2005	Lords of Dogtown	Stecyk	
2006	Jimmy Blue	Jimmy	Short film
2008	Quid Pro Quo	Brooster	
2008	Vicky Cristina Barcelona	Ben	
2008	Nights in Rodanthe	Charlie Torrelson	
2008	Favorite Son	David Paxton	Also co-producer
2009	Breaking Upwards	Turner	
2009	Tell-Tale	Bernard Cochius	
2010	Happythankyoumoreplease	Charlie	
2012	Allegiance	Lieutenant Alec Chambers	
2014	Preservation	Sean Neary	
2014	Fort Bliss	Staff Sergeant Donovan	
2014	After	Christian Valentino	
2015	The Dramatics	Bryan Macy	
2016	13 Hours: The Secret Soldiers of Benghazi	Kris "Tanto" Paronto	
2017	All Summers End	Older Conrad Stevens	
2017	Thumper	Wyatt Rivers	
2017	Big Bear	Dude	
2018	Den of Thieves	Ray Merrimen	
2018	Beast of Burden	Bloom	
2018	Skyscraper	Ben Gillespie	
2018	First Man	Jim Lovell	
2019	The Devil Has a Name	Ezekiel	
2020	Lorelei	Wayland	
2022	The King's Daughter	Dr. Labarthe	
2025	Motor City	Savick	
2026	Batman: Knightfall	Jean-Paul Valley / Azrael	Voice

=== Television ===
Year	Title	Role	Notes
2003, 2008	The Wire	Nick Sobotka	Recurring role (season 2), guest (season 5)
2003	A Painted House	Hank Spruill	Television film
2005, 2007	Law & Order: Criminal Intent	Ed Lang	Episode: "The Unblinking Eye"
2005, 2007	Law & Order: Criminal Intent	TJ Hawkins	Episode: "Self-made"
2005	Into the Fire	Sandy Manetti	Television film
2006, 2008	Law & Order	Kevin Boatman	Episode: "America, Inc."
2006, 2008	Law & Order	Sean Hauser	Episode: "Rumble"
2007, 2013–2014	Law & Order: Special Victims Unit	Dan Kozlowski	Episode: "Haystack"
2007, 2013–2014	Law & Order: Special Victims Unit	William Lewis	Recurring role (seasons 14–15)
2007	The Black Donnellys	Mitchell Carr	Episode: "When the Door Opens"
2008	Dirt	Jason Konkey	3 episodes
2008	Fear Itself	Mattingley	Episode: "Eater"
2008	Army Wives	Tim	3 episodes
2008	Life on Mars	Kim Trent	Episode: "The Real Adventures of the Unreal Sam Tyler"
2009	The Beast	Officer Delaney	Episode: "Capone"
2009	Numbers	Tal Feigenbaum	2 episodes
2009	It's Always Sunny in Philadelphia	Ricky Falcone	Episode: "A Very Sunny Christmas"
2009	Three Rivers	Nick	Episode: "The Kindness of Strangers"
2010	Medium	Jeremy Kiernan	Episode: "An Everlasting Love"
2011	Lights Out	Johnny Leary	Main cast
2011	The Good Wife	Gregory Mars	Episode: "Ham Sandwich"
2011–2012	Weeds	Demetri Ravitch	Recurring role (seasons 7–8)
2011–2012	A Gifted Man	Anton Little Creek	Main cast
2012	Person of Interest	Tommy Clay	Episode: "Matsya Nyaya"
2012	Made in Jersey	Luke Aaronson	Episode: "Pilot"
2013	White Collar	JB Bellmiere	Episode: "The Original"
2013	Muhammad Ali's Greatest Fight	Covert Becker	Television film
2013	Ironside	Virgil	Main cast
2013–2015, 2017, 2019	Orange Is the New Black	George "Pornstache" Mendez	Recurring role (seasons 1–3); Guest (seasons 5, 7); Nominated—Primetime Emmy Award for Outstanding Guest Actor in a Drama Series
2015	The Brink	Zeke Tilson	Main cast
2017–2019	American Gods	Mad Sweeney	Main cast (seasons 1–2)
2020	Defending Jacob	Neal Logiudice	Main cast, miniseries
2022–2024	Halo	Master Chief	Main cast; also producer
2022	Candy	Allan Gore	Miniseries
2025	The Terminal List: Dark Wolf	Hank "Dash" Dashnaw	Episode: "The Wolf You Feed"
2026	His & Hers	Richard Jones	Miniseries
TBA	The Savant	Jason	Upcoming series

=== Video games ===
Year	Title	Voice role
2007	Manhunt 2	The Asylum Staff

=== Audiobooks ===
Year	Title	Voice role
2009	American Psycho	Narrator
2018	The Call of the Wild	Narrator
2019	Daisy Jones & The Six	Narrator / Billy Dunne
