= Sarah McCarron =

American actor and writer

Sarah McCarron is an American actor and writer. She has worked and performed with companies in both Europe and the United States, including the Shakespeare Theatre of New Jersey, Arden Theatre Company, Ensemble Studio Theatre Los Angeles, Gas & Electric Arts, and InterAct Theatre.

== Education ==
McCarron attended the University of Delaware on a full merit scholarship as a Eugene DuPont Distinguished Scholar. She was an Frances Alison Scholar and a member of Phi Beta Kappa society. She studied with members and faculty of the Professional Theatre Training Program. She has a Masters of Fine Arts degree from the London International School of the Performing Arts where she was a member of the first graduating class. This school was founded by Thomas Prattki, who was head of the L'École Internationale de Théâtre Jacques Lecoq.

== Career ==
McCarron worked with Pig Iron Theatre Company to create, develop, and perform in PAY UP, based on the work of Yale economist Keith Chen. The show was nominated for a Barrymore Awards for Excellence in Theater. McCarron, as a part of Centrifuge Ensemble, was commissioned to create a show for the Bebersee Festival in Germany. McCarron was Artist in Residence at the Community Education Center in Philadelphia. She received multiple grants, including from the Leeway Foundation, to write and produce a new play called Owning Up to the Corn, about Appalachia in 2008.

== Filmography ==
=== Acting ===
Year	Title	Role	Notes
2006	The Stone House	Joslin	
2007	Cover	Cellmate	Uncredited
2009	Neighbor	Nancy Baker	

=== Writing ===
Year	Title	Notes
2021	Made for Love	2 episodes
2021–2022	Station Eleven	10 episodes; also executive story editor
2024	Halo	1 episode
