= Kiki Wolfkill =

American video game developer

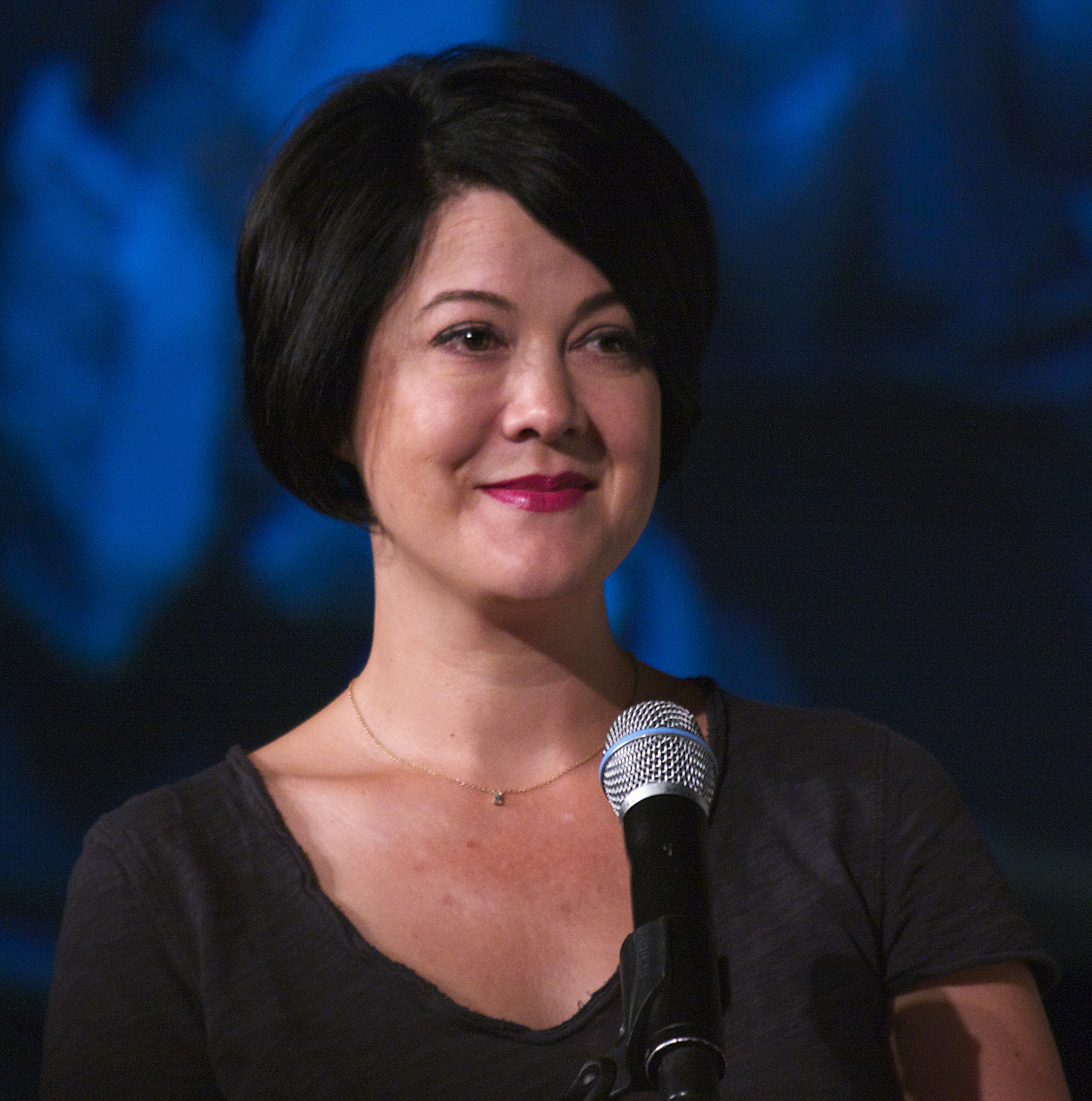
- Wolfkill at San Diego Comic-Con 2015
- Born: July 7, 1969 (age 56); Seattle, Washington, U.S.
- Occupations: Video game artist Executive producer
- Employer: Microsoft (former)
- Notable work: Midtown Madness series Project Gotham Racing series Fable series Halo series

Kiki Wolfkill (born July 7, 1969) is an American video game developer. Wolfkill grew up in Pennsylvania and studied journalism and art at the University of Washington, road racing competitively on the side. At Microsoft, she transitioned from developing multimedia for Microsoft Encarta to working on art for Microsoft's video games, including the racing series Midtown Madness and Project Gotham Racing.

Joining Microsoft subsidiary 343 Industries in 2008, Wolfkill served as executive producer on Halo 4. Wolfkill oversaw the Halo franchise transmedia at 343 Industries until 2023, when she became head of intellectual property expansion and entertainment at Microsoft. Wolfkill left Microsoft after 28 years in 2026.

== Early life ==
Kiki Wolfkill was born on July 7, 1969 in Seattle, Washington. She moved at a young age to New Hope, Pennsylvania, where she grew up on a farm. Wolfkill's parents were competitive racers, and she was around cars and motorsports from an early age. She learned to drive at 13, and her father taught her and her brother how to race by taking them to a track on weekends. Wolfkill recalled her parents giving them a great amount of latitude to be creative growing up, and that they were raised without regards to traditional gender roles.

While Wolfkill played video games growing up, she did not believe it was a viable career choice. Wolfkill was inspired by her father's career in journalism and her mother's Chinese heritage to study Chinese history at Cornell University. After spending time in Seattle before the start of term, however, Wolfkill decided to move to the West Coast. There, she attended the University of Washington, getting degrees in Chinese history and broadcast journalism, with a minor in art. She intended to make documentary films.

During college, Wolfkill started racing. In 1993 she placed second in Sports Car Club of America (SCCA) Club Racing. The following year, she won the SCCA Northwest Region ITS Championship. Starting in 1996, she participated in road racing competitions in the SCCA and Porsche Club Racing circles. Wolfkill also taught racing while pursuing her studies.

== Career ==
After college, Wolfkill interned at multi-purpose computer software company Asymetrix. Following that, she worked for Microsoft Encarta, Microsoft's digital encyclopedia. At Microsoft, Wolfkill transitioned to multimedia for video games, including Microsoft Flight Simulator, CART Precision Racing, and RalliSport Challenge. She joined Microsoft Game Studios in 1998, working as art lead on games including Midtown Madness before being promoted to art director.

Wolfkill was able to use her racing background to provide input on the company's racing games. The studios would beg Microsoft executives for access to their expensive cars to gain reference material. For Midtown Madness, Wolfkill drove cars rigged with microphones around a racing track to gain authentic audio. With later racing games, the art teams used computer-aided design data to build the cars and dynamometers to test the machines. In 2001, Microsoft released their first video game console, the Xbox. Wolfkill transitioned from PC-exclusive games to console titles, such as Project Gotham Racing, Fable, and Mass Effect.

343 Industries was created by Microsoft to manage the Halo franchise following the departure of developer Bungie. Wolfkill looked at a variety of Microsoft studios to join as an executive producer. Meeting with 343 Industries head Bonnie Ross, Wolfkill was impressed with Ross' vision for the studio, and joined 343 Industries in 2008. Wolfkill served as executive producer for Halo 4. Wolfkill and Ross spoke out against sexist comments in the game, threatening permanent bans from the Xbox Live service for offenders. Wolfkill executive produced Halo: The Master Chief Collection in 2014, before transitioning to overseeing the company's broader transmedia efforts.

Wolfkill left 343 Industries in 2023 amid reorganization of the studio, becoming head of intellectual property expansion and entertainment for Microsoft. In that role, she assisted in development of the Minecraft film adaptation, as well as television adaptations of Fallout and Gears of War. Wolfkill announced her departure from Microsoft after 28 years in April 2026.

=== Awards and honors ===
In 2013 Fortune magazine named Wolfkill one of the "10 Most Powerful Women in Gaming". Fast Company included her as one of 2017's most creative people, and journalist Meagan Marie included Wolfkill as one of 100 game developers profiled in the book Women in Gaming: 100 Professionals of Play. Wolfkill is part of the advisory board for the Tribeca Games Award as part of the Tribeca Film Festival, along with Hideo Kojima, Sam Lake, Bing Gordon, and Geoff Keighley.
