= Otto Bathurst =

British director

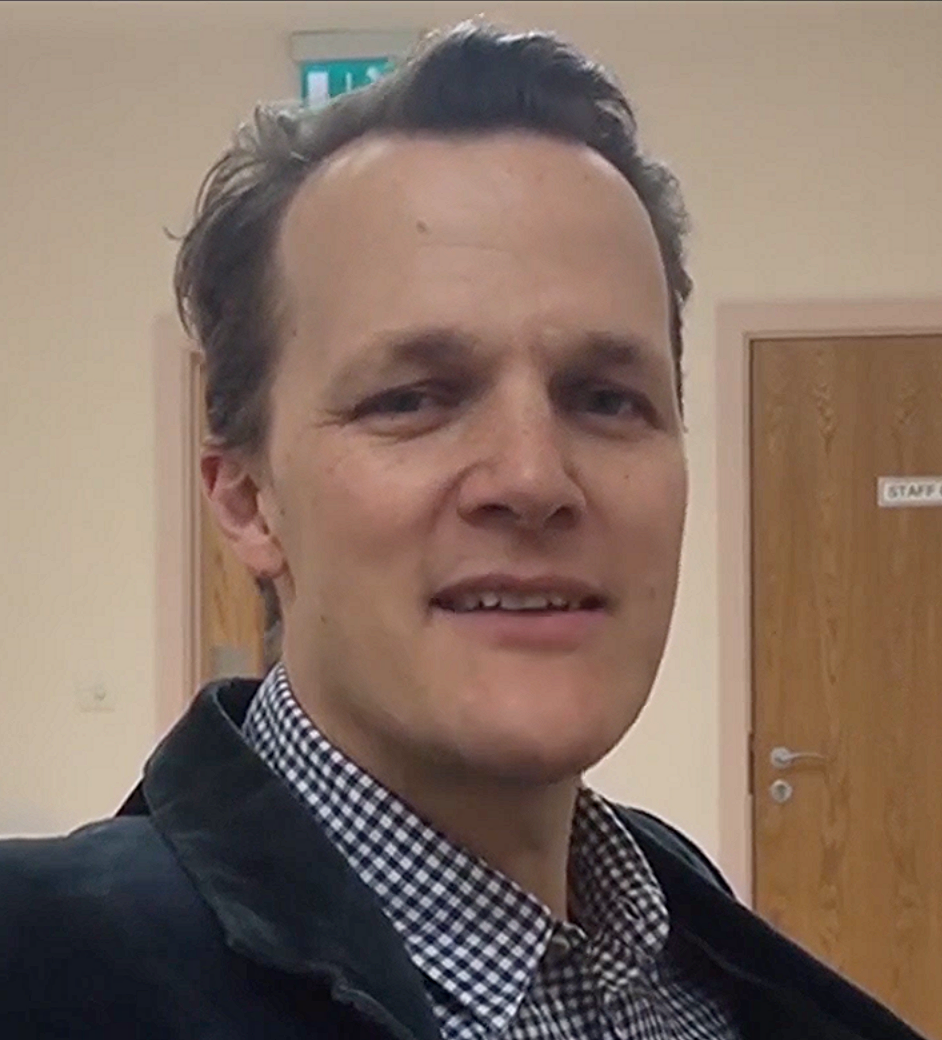
- Bathurst in 2015
- Born: Otto Benjamin Charles Bathurst; 18 January 1971 (age 55); Hammersmith, London England
- Occupations: Television director; film director
- Children: Three

Otto Benjamin Charles Bathurst (born 18 January 1971) is a British television and film director. In 2014, he won a BAFTA for his work on BBC drama Peaky Blinders. He was also previously BAFTA nominated for his work on BBC series Criminal Justice and Five Days.

== Early life ==
Bathurst was born on 18 January 1971, the son of Elizabeth Mary (Thompson) and Christopher Bathurst, 3rd Viscount Bledisloe. He grew up in Dudley and Bridgnorth. He began to study engineering at university, but dropped out to move to London and work in film.

== Family life ==
Bathurst's family has lived in Bath, Somerset since 2013. He enjoys cooking and his favourite restaurant serves classic Indian cuisine.

== Career ==
Bathurst began his career in editing and then worked on commercials, before moving into television. He has taught filmmaking at Oxford and London universities.

In 2009, Bathurst directed Margot, a biopic of Margot Fonteyn starring Anne-Marie Duff, which focused upon the relationship between Fonteyn and Rudolf Nureyev.

In 2011, he directed "The National Anthem", the first episode of the anthology television series Black Mirror.

He has also directed episodes of Urban Gothic, Teachers, and Hustle. In 2013, he was described by Express & Star as "Britain's most exciting director".

In 2018, he made his feature film directorial debut with Robin Hood. It starred Jamie Dornan as Will Scarlett, Jamie Foxx as Little John, Tim Minchin as Friar Tuck, Eve Hewson as Maid Marian, and Taron Egerton as the eponymous hero. The film was universally panned and was estimated to have lost the studio US$83.7 million.

He directed episodes of the historical drama series Lockerbie: A Search for Truth, broadcast in January 2025.

== Filmography ==
Feature film

- Robin Hood (2018)

Television

Year	Title	Director	Executive Producer	Notes
2000-2001	Urban Gothic	Yes	No	4 episodes
2002	Comedy Lab	Yes	No	Episode "Shoreditch Tw*t"
2002	Guardian of the Amazon	Yes	No	TV movie
2003	20 Things to Do Before You're 30	Yes	No	3 episodes
2003	Teachers	Yes	No	3 episodes
2003	UGetMe	Yes	No	6 episodes
2004	NY-LON	Yes	No	Episode "Something About Chemicals"
2005-2006	Hustle	Yes	No	4 episodes
2007	Five Days	Yes	No	3 episodes
2008	Criminal Justice	Yes	No	3 episodes
2009	Margot	Yes	No	TV movie
2011	Black Mirror	Yes	No	Episode "The National Anthem"
2013	Peaky Blinders	Yes	No	3 episodes
2014	Hysteria	Yes	Yes	Unaired pilot
2019	His Dark Materials	Yes	Yes	Episodes "Armour" and "The Lost Boy"
2022	Billy the Kid	Yes	Yes	2 episodes
2022-2024	Halo	Yes	Yes	4 episodes
2023	The Winter King	Yes	Yes	4 episodes
2025	Lockerbie: A Search for Truth	Yes	Yes	4 episodes
2025	The Abandons	Yes	Yes	2 episodes
2026	Prisoner	Yes	Yes	3 episodes
2026	Fightland	Yes	Yes	8 episodes
