= Master Chief (Halo) =

Video game character

John-117 Master Chief Petty Officer
- Halo character
- Master Chief as he appears in Halo Infinite (2021)
- First appearance: Halo: The Fall of Reach (2001)
- First game: Halo: Combat Evolved (2001)
- Created by: Bungie
- Voiced by: Steve Downes (video games); David Wald (Halo Legends); Alex Puccinelli (Halo 4: Forward Unto Dawn)
- Portrayed by: Daniel Cudmore (Halo 4: Forward Unto Dawn); Pablo Schreiber (2022 television series)
- Motion capture: Bruce Thomas (video games; Halo 4 onwards)

Master Chief Petty Officer John-117, colloquially known as the Master Chief, is the protagonist of the Halo video game series and its spin-off media. The character first appeared in the 2001 video game Halo: Combat Evolved, a science fiction first-person shooter that became a long-running franchise. The character also appears in spin-off Halo media such as the 2012 film Halo 4: Forward Unto Dawn, the 2022–2024 Halo television series, and several graphic novels and books.

The Master Chief is a towering supersoldier known as a "Spartan"; kidnapped and trained from childhood for combat against human terrorists, later ultimately fighting against a genocidal alien empire. The designers intended for players to be able to project their own intentions into the character and thus reduced his voiced lines and concealed his appearance under his armor. In the video games, the character is voiced by former disc jockey Steve Downes, who based his performance on Bungie's description calling for a man of few words, similar to Clint Eastwood. In spin-off media, he is portrayed by different voice and physical actors, most notably Pablo Schreiber on the 2022 live-action TV series.

A pop culture icon, Master Chief is widely regarded as one of the greatest video game characters of all time, with the character being seen as the de facto mascot of the Halo and Xbox brands. His 2001 debut received a generally positive reception for his character design, with publications praising how the narrative allows players to inhabit the character, while others have criticized him as under-characterized. In later Halo games developed by 343 Industries, the deepened characterization of Master Chief earned praise for exploring his humanity, heroism, and his relationship with Cortana.

== Character design ==
Shi Kai Wang's preliminary sketch of the Master Chief in Halo: Combat Evolved was later developed to look more like a "walking tank".

When game studio Bungie began developing Halo: Combat Evolved (2001), the design of Master Chief was led by art director Marcus Lehto with support from artist Robert McLees. Shi Kai Wang was later hired as a concept artist, who created a sketch that became the basis for Master Chief. When the sketch was translated into a three-dimensional model, the team felt that it looked too slim and anime-inspired, and Lehto asked for a bulkier character design that felt more like a walking tank. The Chief's armor went through various changes, such as green tint, and the addition (and later removal) of an antenna. The character's two-prong visor, intended to convey speed and agility, was inspired by BMX helmets.

For much of the game's development, the character had no name. Master Chief was always intended to be a soldier in a difficult war, and the team first referred to him as the "Future Soldier" or "The Cyborg". Eric Nylund established the character's birth name as "John" in the tie-novel Halo: The Fall of Reach, but Bungie preferred to avoid using this in the game. Looking to military ranks for inspiration, the developers were attracted to naval ranks as "different" from other game characters. McLees, insisting on accuracy, wanted to make sure the character still had a plausible rank for his role. "Master Chief" was the highest non-commissioned rank for which the character would still be considered "expendable". McLees also felt the shortened "Chief" sounded more colloquial and less like a modern military designation. Though "Master Chief" was intended to be a placeholder, and drew some internal disagreement, the name ended up sticking. Writer Joseph Staten recalled that early on in Halo's development, they had not considered how to engage players in the world, and Master Chief's character was what drew people in.

In developing the sequel Halo 2, Bungie decided to "tone down" the character's design, according to Mclees, keeping a few recognizable elements like the visor and coloring. In the fiction, the character received a new design including upgraded armor, with residual damage illustrated in the high-definition graphics of Halo 3 as the developers had more graphics budget for higher-fidelity models.

For Halo 4, Bungie bought their independence from Microsoft, with Microsoft assigning further Halo development to 343 Industries. Art director Kenneth Scott aimed to find a "sweet spot" where Master Chief's armor remained familiar but still new. The armor was redesigned to feel futuristic and heavy, weighing hundreds of pounds, with details inspired by real-world military vehicles. In contrast to newer characters, Master Chief and elder Spartan soldiers were designed with more utilitarian armor similar to a tank. Despite the visual differences between the character's armor in Halo 3 and Halo 4, the developers intended it to canonically be the same armor. Halo 4 also made extensive use of motion capture for character animation, with Bruce Thomas portraying Master Chief while interacting with multiple actors in studio. Even without his face or voice appearing in the game, Thomas was credited by creative director Josh Holmes for conveying Master Chief's physicality and emotions, and for influencing the other actors' performances. With the development of Halo Infinite, Thomas returned to provide motion capture for the character, as he had in Halo 4 and Halo 5. 343 Industries redesigned Master Chief's armor once again, drawing inspiration from the character's previous appearances.

=== Voice acting ===
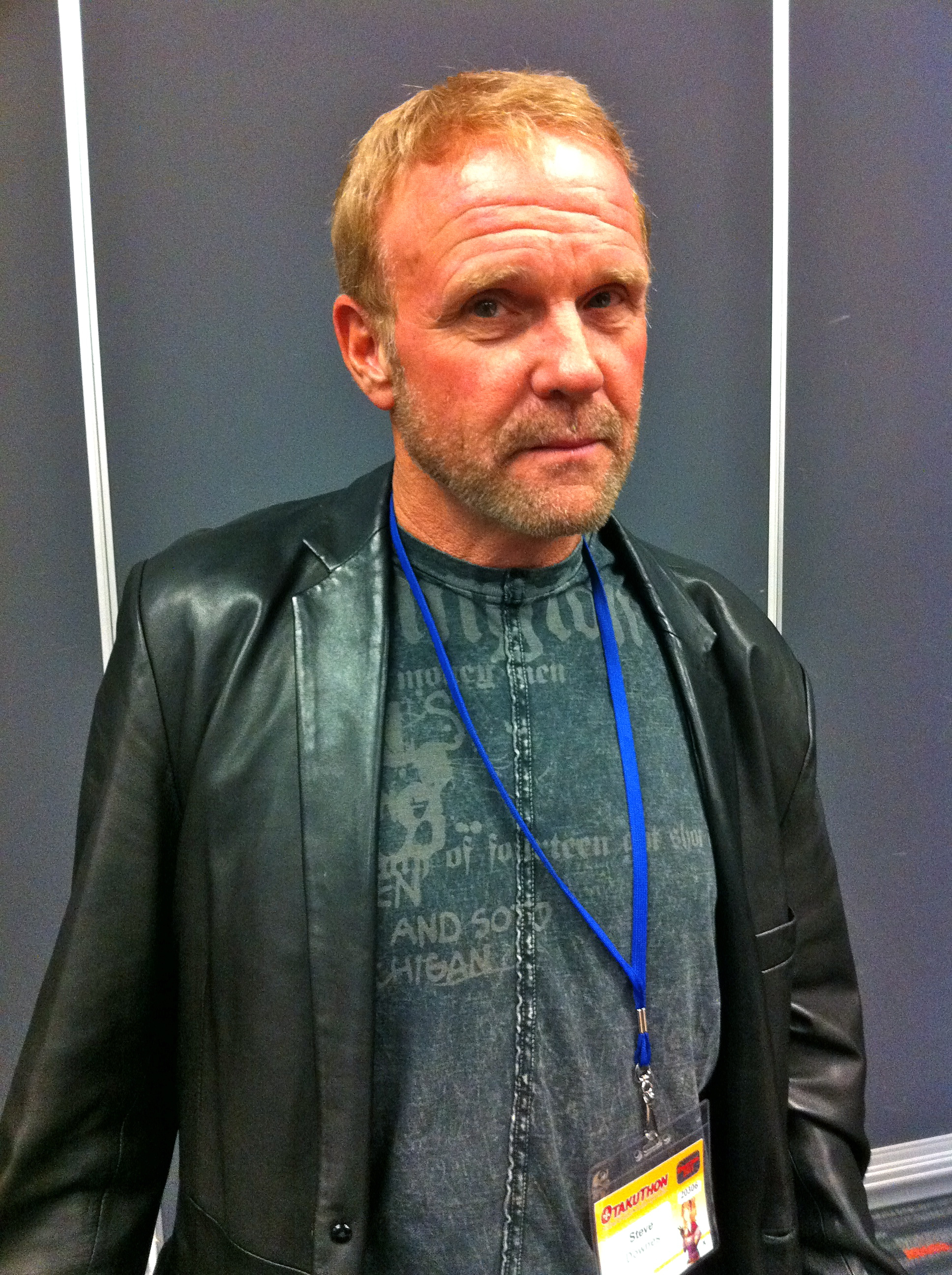
Voice actor Steve Downes at Otakuthon in 2011, who considers Master Chief the most rewarding role in his career

Bungie designed Master Chief as a man of few words, similar to Clint Eastwood characters. The game designers crafted the first game's experience as lonely, to reinforce the backstory that Chief's friends had been largely killed. Master Chief rarely spoke in the early Halo games, making him an almost-silent protagonist. Joseph Staten felt that Master Chief was designed to promote immersion, as "the less players knew about the Chief, we believed, the more they would feel like the Chief." Some at Bungie were against the release of the tie-in novel The Fall of Reach because they felt that Master Chief should remain more mysterious.

Bungie hired voice actor Steve Downes as the voice of Master Chief. Downes had begun his career as a Chicago disc jockey, and was recommended by Bungie musical director Martin O'Donnell, based on their rapport from working together on the game Septerra Core: Legacy of the Creator. Septerra was the first time Downes had performed as a voice actor for a game, and he had never played a video game until Halo. According to Downes, he was offered the part over the phone without an interview or audition. Downes was given creative freedom to develop the Chief's personality during recording. Still, many of the character's lines in the first game were eventually cut, as Staten felt that the more the character spoke, "the more chances there are that we’ll get it wrong for you, whoever you are." With the wide success of the Halo series, Bungie considered recasting a celebrity for the role before deciding against it.

343 Industries took over development of the series with Halo 4, which designed Master Chief as a more fully realized human being instead of just a vessel for the players. Downes felt that his audition for Halo 4 would need to demonstrate more emotional weight, and recalls that he felt like he could have lost the role. He became more involved throughout the development of Halo 4, giving input on advance scripts, and recording in longer sessions. Where Master Chief began the first game with an artificial intelligence companion named Cortana, designed as a gameplay tool to guide the player, Cortana also became a narrative tool to reveal the protagonist's humanity. As such, Halo 4 became the first game to have Downes interacting with actress Jen Taylor (Cortana) in the same space. Halo 4 creative director Josh Holmes cited the game Ico as an inspiration for the Chief-Cortana relationship, noting how the game told a story without dialogue, while also balancing the protagonist's character development with his stoic nature.

For years, Downes avoided appearances at Bungie or Microsoft events, believing that the character's identity "is really in the eye of the player." He has called the role the most rewarding of his voice acting career.

== Appearances ==
In every Halo game, the Master Chief is rarely seen without his armor. Cutscenes were designed to avoid revealing the character's face in order to aid players in identifying with the character. Some games have teased a reveal, such as the first game ending with him removing his helmet or one of the endings of Halo 4 briefly showing the character's eyes. O'Connor said in an interview that revealing the character's face is not as important as the events happening around him.

The Master Chief's backstory is revealed in the 2001 novel The Fall of Reach. Born "John" in 2511, he is covertly taken from the human colony world of Eridanus as a child and conscripted into the SPARTAN-II super-soldier project by the United Nations Space Command (UNSC). John proves a natural leader and leads his peers over eight years of grueling training and dangerous physical augmentation. In the 2003 novel Halo: The Flood, the Master Chief is described as tall with short brown hair, serious eyes, and strong features. His skin is unnaturally pale as a consequence of spending most of his time in his armor. He stands about 7 feet (2.13 m) tall and weighs 1,000 pounds (450 kg) in armor; without it, he stands 6 feet, 10 inches (2.08 m) tall and weighs 287 pounds (130 kg).

=== Main game series ===
Master Chief first appears in Halo: Combat Evolved, the first game in the series. Master Chief and the crew of the UNSC cruiser Pillar of Autumn escape from the human colony of Reach just prior to its destruction by the Covenant(a theocratic alien alliance united by veneration of the vanished Forerunners as gods), and discover a Forerunner ringworld, called Alpha Halo. Master Chief is entrusted with safeguarding Cortana, the ship's artificial intelligence, from capture to ensure that the Covenant don't learn the location of Earth and attack the human colony. While fighting the Covenant, Master Chief and Cortana learn that an ancient race known as the Forerunners created the Halo Array as a last line of defense against an alien parasite called the Flood, which begins to spread across Alpha Halo. Learning that the Halo was designed to contain the Flood by killing all life in the galaxy, thus killing all potential hosts, Master Chief self-destructs the Pillar of Autumn in order to destroy Halo, escaping in a fighter spacecraft with Cortana.

Master Chief returns to Earth in Halo 2 (2004), defending the planet from a Covenant invasion. Pursuing a fleeing Covenant vessel, Master Chief and his crew discover another Halo ring. Master Chief is captured by a Flood intelligence known as the Gravemind, which forges an alliance between them and a disgraced Covenant commander known as the Arbiter. The Gravemind sends them to stop the Halo's activation, with Master Chief arriving at the Covenant citadel High Charity, near the Halo's orbit. Cortana remains on the space station to ensure the ring is destroyed if activated. Master Chief pursues the remaining Covenant leader, the Prophet of Truth, who plans to activate the Halo Array from outside the galaxy.

The story continues in Halo 3 (2007), when Master Chief reunites with the Arbiter to stop the Prophet of Truth. Master Chief and Arbiter pursue the Prophet through a portal to the Ark, a place located beyond the Milky Way, where the remaining Forerunners could reseed life in the galaxy after the Halo Array fired. On the Ark, the Flood-controlled High Charity crashes into the installation. Master Chief stops the Array from firing and rescues Cortana by battling through the wreckage of High Charity. Together, they activate a replacement Halo being built on the Ark, stopping the Flood and sparing the galaxy at large. As the Arbiter, Master Chief, and Cortana enter a portal back to Earth on the UNSC ship Forward Unto Dawn, the portal closes prematurely, sending half of the ship with the Arbiter back to Earth, while the Master Chief and Cortana are trapped aboard the other half of the ship, with no way back.

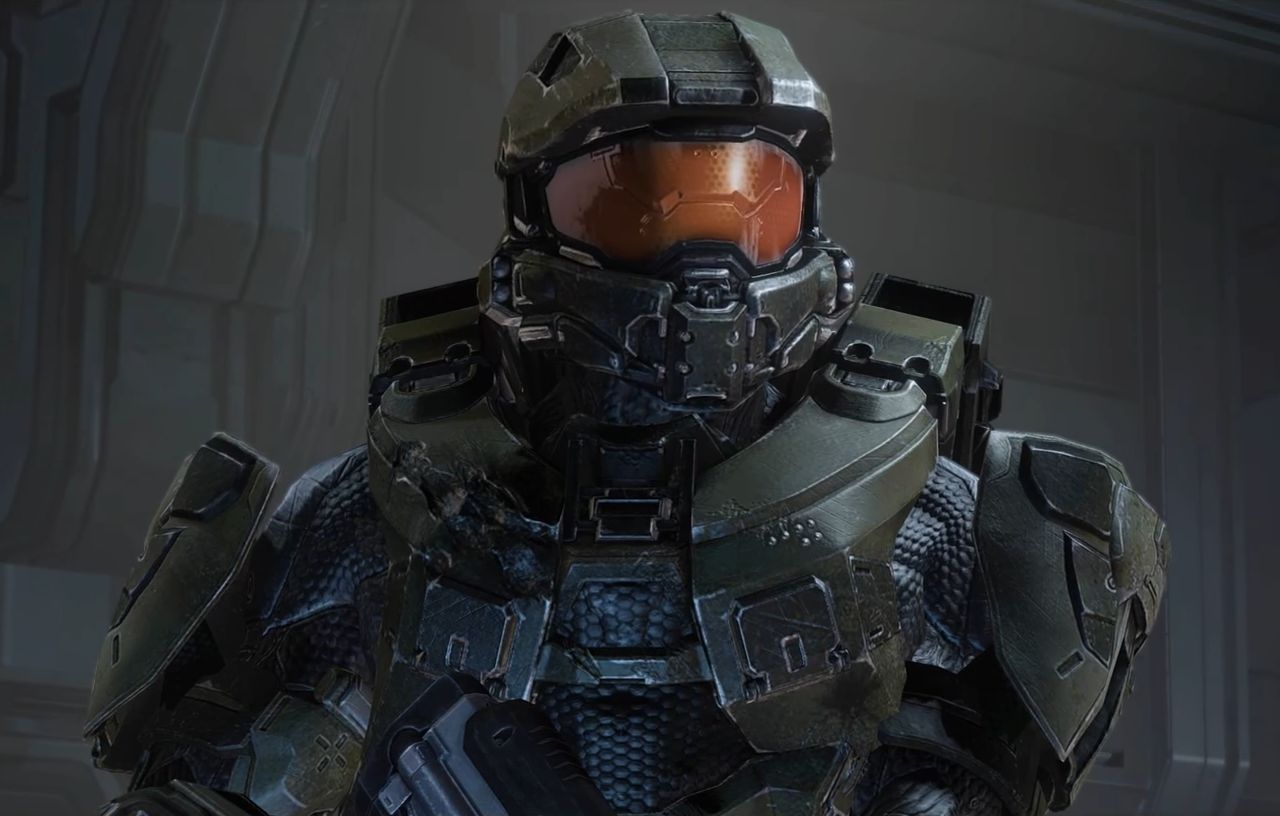
Master Chief in Halo 4

Master Chief returns as the playable protagonist in Halo 4 (2012) after his omission from Halo 3: ODST (2009) and a brief Easter egg in Halo: Reach (2010). Halo 4 begins with Cortana awakening Master Chief from cryonic sleep, both drifting toward a Forerunner installation called Requiem. Hoping to prevent the UNSC ship Infinity from also being drawn into Requiem, Master Chief and Cortana attempt to activate what they believe is a communications relay. Instead, Master Chief awakens the Didact, a Forerunner with a grudge against humanity. Master Chief and Cortana pursue the Didact, stopping his attack on Earth when Cortana sacrifices herself.

At the start of Halo 5: Guardians (2015), Master Chief is contacted by Cortana, presumed to be destroyed in the previous game. She directs him to the human colony of Meridian. By leading his Blue Team to the colony against UNSC orders, Master Chief provokes a rival group of Spartans, Fireteam Osiris. The Blue Team boards a buried Forerunner construct known as a Guardian, which transports them to the Forerunner planet Genesis. Cortana reveals that she survived thanks to the Domain, a repository of ancient Forerunner knowledge. A degenerating and thus newly evil Cortana reveals her authoritarian plans for the galaxy and imprisons Master Chief and his team in stasis. They are rescued through the efforts of Fireteams Osiris but forced to retreat as Cortana mobilizes the Forerunner Guardians and other human AIs as her enforcers.

Master Chief returns as the main protagonist in Halo Infinite (2021). The story has him work with the Weapon, an AI modeled after Cortana, to stop another Halo from being activated by space pirates known as the Banished.

=== Spin-off media ===
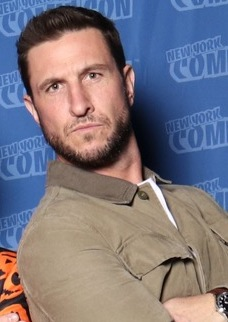
The 2022 Halo television series features Pablo Schreiber in the role of Master Chief.

Initial plans for a Halo film were abandoned around 2008, which would have featured a faceless depiction of Master Chief. The character made his live-action debut in the 2012 film Halo 4: Forward Unto Dawn, portrayed physically by Daniel Cudmore, with voice acting from Alex Puccinelli. On the 2022 Halo television series, the character is played by Pablo Schreiber. Master Chief takes off his helmet in the series in an effort to make the audience empathize with the character.

Master Chief is a major character in the novels Silent Storm (2018), Oblivion (2019), and Shadows of Reach (2020), written by Troy Denning. The character also appears in the 2010 animated anthology Halo Legends, as well as the comics The Halo Graphic Novel, Halo: Uprising, Halo: Collateral Damage, and Halo: Tales from Slipspace. Peter David's graphic novel Helljumpers contains a cameo by Master Chief "before he actually was [the Chief]".

The character also appears in games outside the Halo series. This includes a guest appearance as a playable character in Super Bomberman R for the Xbox One and a cosmetic outfit in the battle royale game Fortnite. Fable II includes a medieval variation of Master Chief's armor, worn by a legendary hero named "Hal". The character is also referenced in Halo-based machinima parody series Red vs. Blue, created by Rooster Teeth Productions. When Team Ninja approached Bungie to use Master Chief in Dead or Alive 4 (2005), they declined due to storyline restrictions, resulting in the inclusion of another Spartan super-soldier named Nicole (Spartan-458).

=== Marketing and merchandise ===
The Halo video games have emphasized Master Chief in their marketing. This includes campaigns such as "The Museum" and "Believe" for Halo 3, a trailer for Halo 4, the "Hunt the Truth" for Halo 5, and "Become" for Halo Infinite. The character has also been featured on several physical products, including Slurpees, Mountain Dew, branded controllers, and clothing. Several Master Chief action figures were marketed around the Halo series, including lines by McFarlane, Jazwares, 1000toys, and Mega Bloks. One2One collectibles also produced 1:2 scale busts of the Master Chief. Xbox marketing director Ed Ventura explained, "We want to be in the hearts and minds of our fans as much as we can."

== Analysis ==
Reviewers have suggested that Master Chief's birth name John-117 could be a Biblical reference. Comparing Halo to the Christopher Rowley's novel Starhammer, IGN noted similar elements between Master Chief and the character Jon 6725416. Michael Nitsche of the Georgia Institute of Technology compared Master Chief to Half-Life protagonist Gordon Freeman, as both characters "are the independent, individualistic, and often lonely heroes that gain admiration by constantly proving their superiority ... in technology-driven, hostile, often closed spaces." Roger Travis, associate professor of classics at the University of Connecticut, compared Master Chief to the epic hero Aeneas, as both settings involve superhuman characters protecting civilization against militaristic enemies. Matthew Stover compared Halo to the Iliad, due to the shared theme that "war is the crucible of character". Stover also argues that the cyborg is an apt characterization for the Master Chief, since the character is more relatable than a pure machine, but still not fully characterized as a human being.

== Cultural impact ==
=== Reception ===
Master Chief is a gaming icon, and has appeared on multiple publications' lists of the best video game characters; a 2024 poll conducted by the British Academy of Film and Television Arts named Master Chief as the eighth most iconic video game character of all time. Downes realized the character was a huge hit only after children lined up around the block for his autograph, a year after the first game shipped.

Writing for Time, Lev Grossman called the Master Chief a "new kind of celebrity for a new and profoundly weird millennium", as well as a sign of video games becoming a more legitimate art form. On the occasion of Madame Tussauds unveiling a wax sculpture of the Chief, Pete Wentz of Fall Out Boy called the Master Chief a hero of the times as much as characters like Spider-Man and Luke Skywalker were for previous generations. Master Chief has also been called the de facto mascot or symbol for Microsoft, their Xbox console, and a generation of gamers. BusinessWeek listed the Master Chief among several video game characters who have been branded beyond their respective video games, "helping them transcend the very medium in the process". He is the primary gaming mascot of the Xbox Bowl college football game, delivering the opening coin toss and presenting the trophy to the winners.

The faceless nature of the character has alternatively been praised and criticized. Writing for The Artifice, Sam Gray argued that the character's lack of conflict made him uninteresting, as he uncomfortably straddles the line between silent and active protagonist. O'Connor noted that players invest the character with much of his meaning, creating a conflict between players who prefer more personality and those who prefer "a sort of paragon of useful emptiness". Jesse Schedeen of IGN has called him gaming's most overrated character, due to his status as a "generic" action hero.

The more character-focused portrayal of Chief in Halo 4 was positively received. Todd Martens of the Los Angeles Times called Halo 4 a more introspective Halo game, and the first to explore the motivations and emotions of the Master Chief. While reviews found the game's story hard to follow, they praised efforts to flesh out Master Chief's personality and relationship with Cortana. Halo 5 received backlash from fans about Master Chief's reduced role in the story, as he appeared in fewer story missions compared to Fireteam Osiris. Kotaku's Stephen Totilo wrote that the confrontation between Locke and Master Chief felt "under-cooked", preferring how Hunt the Truth presented the story of a rogue Master Chief. O'Connor responded by promising to refocus on Master Chief in future media. In Halo Infinite, Master Chief's characterization earned widespread praise for showcasing his heroism, leadership, and care towards his fellow soldiers, notably in a personal scene with the Pelican pilot where he exclaims "We all fail. We all make mistakes, it's what makes us human."
