= Ghost in the Shell: Stand Alone Complex (2005 video game) =

2005 video game

- North American cover art
- Developer: G-Artists (Note: Additional work by Sony Computer Entertainment Japan.)
- Publishers: JP: Sony Computer Entertainment; NA/EU: Bandai
- Series: Ghost in the Shell
- Platform: PlayStation Portable
- Release: JP: September 15, 2005; EU: October 21, 2005; NA: October 25, 2005; AU: November 4, 2005
- Genre: Shooter
- Modes: Single-player, multiplayer

Ghost in the Shell: Stand Alone Complex (Note: Released in Japan as Kokaku Kidotai: Stand Alone Complex - Domain of the Hunters (Note: Japanese: 攻殻機動隊 STAND ALONE COMPLEX -狩人の領域-, Hepburn: Kōkaku Kidōtai Sutando Arōn Konpurekkusu -Kariudo no Ryōiki-)) is a 2005 first-person shooter video game developed by G-Artists and published by Sony Computer Entertainment for the PlayStation Portable. Bandai released the game outside Japan. It is based on the cyberpunk anime series Ghost in the Shell: Stand Alone Complex and a sequel to the first Ghost in the Shell: Stand Alone Complex game. It was released in Japan on September 15, 2005, in Europe on October 21, 2005 distributed by Atari Europe, and in North America on October 26, 2005, but releasing it under the same name as the original PS2 game caused confusion and misinterpretation of it as a port.

== Gameplay ==
Ghost in the Shell features first-person shooter gameplay. Customizable Tachikoma sentient tanks, which can operate independently as AI characters or be ridden inside by players, accompany the player at all times. Playable characters include Motoko Kusanagi, Batou, Togusa, and Saito. All levels can be played by all characters. Aramaki is also available for multiplayer matches. All characters have varying statistics which can affect how a game plays out, for example Batou has more health than other players and Saito holds sniper rifles steadier than others. In addition, Tachikoma robots can act as an AI companion, and players can select from four Tachikoma "characters", balanced, aggressive, intelligent and humorous. Controls are similar to other first person shooter games on the platform, such as Coded Arms and Medal of Honor: Heroes.

== Plot ==
Dealing with similar concepts to other incarnations of Ghost in the Shell, the game has an original storyline which follows on from and refers to the PlayStation 2 game's plotline.

== Reception ==
Reception

Aggregate score
Aggregator	Score
Metacritic	61/100

Review scores
Publication	Score
Famitsu	30/40
Game Informer	5.5/10
GameSpot	5.9/10
GameSpy	2.5/5
GameZone	5.8/10
IGN	6.2/10
PlayStation Official Magazine – UK	5/10
Official U.S. PlayStation Magazine	3.5/5
PALGN	6/10
PlayStation: The Official Magazine	5.5/10
The Times	4/5

The game received "mixed" reviews according to the review aggregation website Metacritic. Reviewers generally noted flaws in gameplay and graphics. In Japan, Famitsu gave it a score of 30 out of 40.
