= Ghost in the Shell =

Japanese cyberpunk media franchise

- Logo used in the 1995 film adaptation of the series
- Created by: Masamune Shirow
- Original work: Ghost in the Shell (1989–90)
- Owners: Masamune Shirow; Kodansha
- Years: 1989 – present

Print publications
- Novels: Ghost in the Shell: Stand Alone Complex – The Lost Memory (2004); Ghost in the Shell: Stand Alone Complex – Revenge of the Cold Machines (2004); Ghost in the Shell: Stand Alone Complex – White Maze (2005); The Ghost in the Shell: Five New Short Stories (2017)

Films and television
- Films: Ghost in the Shell (1995); Ghost in the Shell 2: Innocence (2004); Ghost in the Shell: The New Movie (2015); Ghost in the Shell (2017); Ghost in the Shell: SAC_2045 – Sustainable War (2021); Ghost in the Shell: SAC_2045 – The Last Human (2023)
- Web series: Ghost in the Shell: SAC_2045 (2020–22)
- Animated series: Ghost in the Shell: Stand Alone Complex (2002–05); Ghost in the Shell: Arise – Alternative Architecture (2015); The Ghost in the Shell (2026)
- Television film: Ghost in the Shell: Stand Alone Complex – Solid State Society (2006)
- Direct-to-video: Ghost in the Shell: Stand Alone Complex – The Laughing Man (2005); Ghost in the Shell: S.A.C. 2nd GIG – Individual Eleven (2006); Ghost in the Shell: Arise (2013–15)

Theatrical presentations
- Plays: Ghost in the Shell: Arise – Ghost Is Alive (2015); VR Noh The Ghost in the Shell (2020–present)

Games
- Video games: Ghost in the Shell (1997); Ghost in the Shell: Stand Alone Complex (2004); Ghost in the Shell: Stand Alone Complex (2005); Ghost in the Shell: S.A.C. Cyber Mission (2011); Ghost in the Shell: Stand Alone Complex (2011); Ghost in the Shell: S.A.C. Tachikoma Wars! (2012); Ghost in the Shell: Stand Alone Complex – First Assault Online (2017); Ghost in the Shell Arise: Stealth Hounds (2017)

Ghost in the Shell (Note: Known in Japan as Kōkaku Kidōtai (Japanese: 攻殻機動隊; lit. "Mobile Armored Riot Police")) is a Japanese cyberpunk military science fiction media franchise that began with the eponymous manga series, written and illustrated by Masamune Shirow. The manga, first serialized from 1989 to 1991, is set in the mid-21st-century and follows the fictional counter-terrorist organization Public Security Section 9, led by cyborg protagonist Major Motoko Kusanagi.

Animation studio Production I.G has produced several anime adaptations of the series. These include the 1995 film of the same name and its 2004 sequel, Ghost in the Shell 2: Innocence; the 2002 television series Ghost in the Shell: Stand Alone Complex and its 2020 follow-up, Ghost in the Shell: SAC_2045; and the Ghost in the Shell: Arise original video animation series. An American-produced live-action film was released in March 2017. A direct adaptation of the manga produced by Science Saru, titled The Ghost in the Shell, aired in 2026.

== Overview ==
=== Title ===
The original editor Koichi Yuri said that Shirow first submitted Ghost in the Shell as the title for the manga, but when Yuri asked for "something more flashy", Shirow came up with "攻殻機動隊 Koukaku Kidou Tai (Shell Squad)" for Yuri. However, Shirow was attached to including "Ghost in the Shell" as well even if in smaller type, creating the full title of the series.

=== Setting ===
Primarily set in the mid-twenty-first century in the fictional Japanese city of Niihama, Niihama Prefecture (新浜県新浜市, Niihama-ken Niihama-shi), (Note: There is a real-world Niihama, located in Ehime Prefecture, but its name is written differently in kanji: 新居浜市.) otherwise known as New Port City (ニューポートシティ, Nyū Pōto Shiti), the manga and the many anime adaptations follow the members of Public Security Section 9, a task force consisting of various professionals skilled at solving and preventing crime, mostly with some sort of police background. Political intrigue and counter-terrorism operations are standard fare for Section 9, but the various actions of corrupt officials, companies, and cyber-criminals in each scenario are unique and require the diverse skills of Section 9's staff to prevent a series of incidents from escalating.

In this post-cyberpunk iteration of a possible future, computer technology has advanced to the point that many members of the public possess cyberbrains, technology that allows them to interface their biological brain with various networks. The level of cyberization varies from simple minimal interfaces to almost complete replacement of the brain with cybernetic parts, in cases of severe trauma. This can also be combined with various levels of prostheses, with a fully prosthetic body enabling a person to become a cyborg. The main character of Ghost in the Shell, Major Motoko Kusanagi, is such a cyborg, having had a terrible accident befall her as a child that ultimately required her to use a full-body prosthesis to house her cyberbrain. This high level of cyberization, however, opens the brain up to attacks from highly skilled hackers, with the most dangerous being those who will hack a person to bend to their whims.

== Media ==
=== Literature ===
==== Original manga ====
The original Ghost in the Shell manga ran in Japan from April 1989 to November 1990 in Kodansha's manga anthology Young Magazine, and was released in a tankōbon volume on October 2, 1991. Ghost in the Shell 2: Man-Machine Interface followed in 1997 for nine issues in Young Magazine, and was collected in the Ghost in the Shell: Solid Box on December 1, 2000. Then a standard version with modifications and new pages was published on June 26, 2001. Four stories from Man-Machine Interface that were not released in tankobon format from previous releases were later collected in Ghost in the Shell 1.5: Human-Error Processor, and published by Kodansha on July 17, 2003. Several art books have also been published for the manga.

=== Films ===
==== Animated films ====
Two animated films based on the original manga have been released, both directed by Mamoru Oshii and animated by Production I.G. Ghost in the Shell was released in 1995 and follows the "Puppet Master" storyline from the manga. It was re-released in 2008 as Ghost in the Shell 2.0 with new audio and updated 3D computer graphics in certain scenes. Innocence, otherwise known as Ghost in the Shell 2: Innocence, was released in 2004, with its story based on a chapter from the first manga.

==== Live-action film ====
In 2008, DreamWorks and producer Steven Spielberg acquired the rights to a live-action film adaptation of the original Ghost in the Shell manga. On January 24, 2014, Rupert Sanders was announced as director, with a screenplay by William Wheeler. In April 2016, the full cast was announced, which included Juliette Binoche, Chin Han, Lasarus Ratuere and Kaori Momoi, and Scarlett Johansson in the lead role; the casting of Johansson drew accusations of whitewashing. Principal photography on the film began on location in Wellington, New Zealand, on February 1, 2016. Filming wrapped in June 2016. Ghost in the Shell premiered in Tokyo on March 16, 2017, and was released in the United States on March 31, 2017, in 2D, 3D and IMAX 3D. It received mixed reviews, with praise for its visuals and Johansson's performance but criticism for its script.

=== Television ===
==== Stand Alone Complex TV series, film and ONA ====
In 2002, Ghost in the Shell: Stand Alone Complex premiered on Animax, presenting a new telling of Ghost in the Shell independent from the original manga, focusing on Section 9's investigation of the Laughing Man hacker. It was followed in 2004 by a second season titled Ghost in the Shell: S.A.C. 2nd GIG, which focused on the Individual Eleven terrorist group. The primary storylines of both seasons were compressed into OVAs broadcast as Ghost in the Shell: Stand Alone Complex The Laughing Man in 2005 and Ghost in the Shell: Stand Alone Complex Individual Eleven in 2006. Also in 2006, Ghost in the Shell: Stand Alone Complex - Solid State Society, featuring Section 9's confrontation with a hacker known as the Puppeteer, was broadcast, serving as a finale to the anime series. The extensive score for the series and its films was composed by Yoko Kanno.

On April 7, 2017, Kodansha and Production I.G announced that Kenji Kamiyama and Shinji Aramaki would be co-directing a new Kōkaku Kidōtai anime production. On December 7, 2018, it was reported by Netflix that they had acquired the worldwide streaming rights to the original net animation (ONA) anime series, titled Ghost in the Shell: SAC_2045, and that it would premiere on April 23, 2020. The series is in 3DCG and Sola Digital Arts collaborated with Production I.G on the project. Ilya Kuvshinov handled character designs. The series had two seasons of 12 episodes each.

In addition to the anime, a series of published books, two separate manga adaptations, and several video games for consoles and mobile phones have been released for Stand Alone Complex.

==== Arise OVA, TV series and film ====
In 2013, a new iteration of the series titled Ghost in the Shell: Arise premiered, taking an original look at the Ghost in the Shell world, set before the original manga. It was released as a series of four original video animation (OVA) episodes (with limited theatrical releases) from 2013 to 2014, then recompiled as a 10-episode television series under the title of Kōkaku Kidōtai: Arise - Alternative Architecture. An additional fifth OVA titled Pyrophoric Cult, originally premiering in the Alternative Architecture broadcast as two original episodes, was released on August 26, 2015. Kazuchika Kise served as the chief director of the series, with Tow Ubukata as head writer. Cornelius was brought onto the project to compose the score for the series, with the Major's new voice actress Maaya Sakamoto also providing vocals for certain tracks.

Ghost in the Shell: The New Movie, also known as Ghost in the Shell: Arise − The Movie or New Ghost in the Shell, is a 2015 film directed by Kazuya Nomura that serves as a finale to the Ghost in the Shell: Arise story arc. The film is a continuation to the plot of the Pyrophoric Cult episode of Arise, and ties up loose ends from that arc.

A manga adaptation was serialized in Kodansha's Young Magazine, which started on March 13 and ended on August 26, 2013.

==== 2026 TV series ====
On May 25, 2024, it was announced that a new anime television series adaptation will be produced by Science Saru, which the studio would be part of its production committee alongside Bandai Namco Filmworks, Kodansha and Production I.G. The series is directed by Moko-chan, with a script by Toh EnJoe, and aired from July to September 2026.

=== Video games ===
Ghost in the Shell was developed by Exact and released for the PlayStation on July 17, 1997, in Japan by Sony Computer Entertainment. It is a third-person shooter featuring an original storyline where the character plays a rookie member of Section 9. The video game's soundtrack Megatech Body features various techno artists, such as Takkyu Ishino, Scan X and Mijk Van Dijk.

Several video games were also developed to tie into the Stand Alone Complex television series, in addition to a first-person shooter by Nexon and Neople titled Ghost in the Shell: Stand Alone Complex - First Assault Online, released in 2016.

A virtual reality game entitled Ghost in the Shell Arise: Stealth Hounds, was made available at Bandai Namco's arcade VR Zone Shinjuku in 2017.

== Legacy ==
Ghost in the Shell influenced some prominent filmmakers. The Wachowskis, creators of The Matrix and its sequels, showed it to producer Joel Silver, saying, "We wanna do that for real." The Matrix series took several concepts from the film, including the Matrix digital rain, which was inspired by the opening credits of Ghost in the Shell, and the way characters access the Matrix through holes in the back of their necks. Other parallels have been drawn to James Cameron's Avatar, Steven Spielberg's A.I. Artificial Intelligence and Jonathan Mostow's Surrogates. James Cameron cited Ghost in the Shell as a source of inspiration, citing it as an influence on Avatar.

Bungie's 2001 third-person action game Oni draws substantial inspiration from Ghost in the Shell's setting and characters. Ghost in the Shell also influenced video games such as the Metal Gear Solid series, Deus Ex, and Cyberpunk 2077.

The track The Ballade of Puppets: The Ghost Awaits in the World Beyond written and arranged by Kenji Kawai for the movie Ghost in the Shell 2: Innocence was used as the opening number of the ice show Ice Explosion 2023, produced by Japanese figure skater, Olympic bronze medallist and former world champion Daisuke Takahashi. The performance included an ensemble of 24 elite figure skaters (including Takahashi, Olympic champion Shizuka Arakawa, former world silver medallists Kaitlyn Weaver and Andrew Poje and Olympic team bronze medallist Jason Brown) and was choreographed by retired ice dancer Massimo Scali. Takahashi said about the song "I've been obsessed with this song since I was 18 and wanted to skate to it myself one day... It's over four minutes long, so I didn't really get the chance, but I thought it would be cool to use it for the opening."

Echoes of Life, a solo ice show tour by Japanese figure skater and two-time Olympic champion Yuzuru Hanyu, included a program with the song Utai IV Reawakening arranged by Kenji Kawai for the live-action American film Ghost in the Shell. The programs of Echoes of Life are woven into a story that questions the meaning of life following the journey of an enhance human being in a devastated, imaginary near future.
