= King of My Castle =

1997 single by Wamdue Project

Single by Wamdue Project

from the album Program Yourself
- Released: May 24, 1997
- Genre: House
- Length: 3:40 (original radio edit)
- Label: Eruption; Strictly Rhythm; AM:PM (1999)
- Songwriter: Chris Brann
- Producer: Chris Brann

Wamdue Project singles chronology
"The Deep EP" (1998)	"King of My Castle" (1997)	"Program Yourself" (1999)

Music video
- "King of My Castle" on YouTube

"King of My Castle" is a song by American electronic music producer Chris Brann under his Wamdue Project alias, with vocals by Gaelle Adisson. It was originally released in 1997 as a downtempo song but became a worldwide club hit in 1999 when it was remixed by Italian house producer Roy Malone (real name Mauro Ferrucci) and included on the 1998 album Program Yourself. The song peaked at number one on the US Billboard Dance Club Play chart, topped the UK Singles Chart, and peaked within the top 10 in at least 12 other countries, including Denmark, France, Germany, the Netherlands, and Norway.

== Song information ==
The song's title and lyrics reference Sigmund Freud's theory of the unconscious which holds that the human ego is not free and is instead controlled by its own unconscious id—in Freud's own words, "das Ich ist nicht Herr im eigenen Hause" ("the ego is not king of its own castle"). One of the song's two music videos consists of footage from the 1995 anime film Ghost in the Shell, where people with cyborg implants have their actions controlled against their will by a hacker criminal known in the film as "puppetmaster".

== Track listings ==
=== 1998 release ===
UK CD single

1. "King of My Castle" (original edit)
2. "King of My Castle" (Beef Injection mix)
3. "King of My Castle" (original version)
4. "King of My Castle" (S' Man's Comin 4 Ya Castle mix)
5. "King of My Castle" (Charles Schillings Toboggan mix)
6. "King of My Castle" (Bronx Dogs mix)

UK 12-inch single

A1. "King of My Castle" (original version)
B1. "King of My Castle" (S' Man's Comin 4 Ya Castle mix)
B2. "King of My Castle" (Beef Injection mix)

European CD single

1. "King of My Castle" (Roy Malone's King radio edit) – 3:40
2. "King of My Castle" (S' Man's Comin 4 Ya Castle radio edit) – 3:11

Australian CD single

1. "King of My Castle" (Roy Malone's King edit)
2. "King of My Castle" (Roy Malone's King mix)
3. "King of My Castle" (original mix)
4. "King of My Castle" (S' Man's Comin 4 Ya Castle mix)
5. "King of My Castle" (Charles Schilling Toboggan mix)

=== 1999 release ===
US 12-inch single

A1. "King of My Castle" (Roy Malone's King mix) – 4:56
A2. "King of My Castle" (Armins Gimmick dub) – 6:19
B1. "King of My Castle" (Bini & Martini 999 mix) – 6:27
B2. "King of My Castle" (Bini & Martini 999 dub) – 7:44

UK CD single

1. "King of My Castle" (Roy Malone's King radio edit) – 3:25
2. "King of My Castle" (Armin van Buuren remix) – 6:22
3. "King of My Castle" (Bini & Martini 999 mix) – 6:25
4. "King of My Castle" (original radio edit) – 3:37

UK 12-inch single

A1. "King of My Castle" (Bini & Martini 999 mix) – 7:44
AA1. "King of My Castle" (Armin van Buuren remix) – 6:22
AA2. "King of My Castle" (Roy Malone's King mix) – 4:56

UK cassette single

1. "King of My Castle" (Roy Malone's King radio edit)
2. "King of My Castle" (Armin van Buuren remix)
3. "King of My Castle" (S' Man's Comin 4 Ya Castle)

Dutch CD single

1. "King of My Castle" (Roy Malone's King radio edit) – 3:42
2. "King of My Castle" (original version) – 8:11

Australian and New Zealand CD single

1. "King of My Castle" (Armin van Buuren radio edit) – 3:43
2. "King of My Castle" (Roy Malone's King radio) – 3:33
3. "King of My Castle" (Armin van Buuren remix) – 6:22
4. "King of My Castle" (Bini & Martini 999 mix) – 6:25
5. "King of My Castle" (original radio edit) – 3:37

== Charts ==
=== Weekly charts ===
Weekly chart performance for "King of My Castle"
Chart (1999–2000)	Peak position
Australia (ARIA)	26
Austria (Ö3 Austria Top 40)	5
Belgium (Ultratop 50 Flanders)	5
Belgium (Ultratop 50 Wallonia)	3
Canada (Nielsen SoundScan)	17
Canada Dance/Urban (RPM)	4
Denmark (IFPI)	3
Europe (Eurochart Hot 100)	9
Finland (Suomen virallinen lista)	15
France (SNEP)	6
Germany (GfK)	3
Greece (IFPI)	5
Iceland (Íslenski Listinn Topp 40)	5
Ireland (IRMA)	5
Italy (Musica e dischi)	3
Netherlands (Dutch Top 40)	2
Netherlands (Single Top 100)	2
New Zealand (Recorded Music NZ)	21
Norway (VG-lista)	2
Scottish Singles Sales (Official Charts)	1
Sweden (Sverigetopplistan)	31
Switzerland (Schweizer Hitparade)	7
UK Singles (Official Charts)	1
UK Dance (Official Charts)	1
US Dance Club Songs (Billboard)	1

Weekly chart performance for "King of My Castle 2009"
Chart (2008–2009)	Peak position
Belgium (Ultratop 50 Flanders)	10
Belgium (Ultratop 50 Wallonia)	15
Netherlands (Dutch Top 40)	14
Netherlands (Single Top 100)	37

=== Year-end charts ===
1999 year-end chart performance for "King of My Castle"
Chart (1999)	Position
Austria (Ö3 Austria Top 40)	32
Belgium (Ultratop 50 Flanders)	36
Belgium (Ultratop 50 Wallonia)	14
Europe (Eurochart Hot 100)	15
Europe Airplay (Music & Media)	97
Europe Border Breakers (Music & Media)	11
France (SNEP)	27
Germany (Media Control)	10
Netherlands (Dutch Top 40)	21
Netherlands (Single Top 100)	24
Switzerland (Schweizer Hitparade)	37
UK Singles (OCC)	28
UK Club Chart (Music Week)	21

2000 year-end chart performance for "King of My Castle"
Chart (2000)	Position
US Dance Club Play (Billboard)	13

2008 year-end chart performance for "King of My Castle 2009"
Chart (2008)	Position
Netherlands (Dutch Top 40)	82

== Certifications ==
Certifications and sales for "King of My Castle"
Region	Certification	Certified units/sales
Belgium (BRMA)	Platinum	50,000^{*}
France (SNEP)	Gold	250,000^{*}
Netherlands (NVPI)	Gold	50,000^{^}
Norway (IFPI Norway)	Gold	
United Kingdom (BPI)	Gold	400,000^{^}
Summaries
Worldwide	—	2,000,000
^{*} Sales figures based on certification alone.^{^} Shipments figures based on certification alone.

== Release history ==
Release dates and formats for "King of My Castle"
Region	Date	Format(s)	Label(s)	Ref(s).
United States	May 24, 1997	—N/a	Strictly Rhythm	
United Kingdom	June 22, 1998	12-inch vinyl; CD	Eruption	
United Kingdom (re-release)	November 15, 1999	12-inch vinyl; CD; cassette	AM:PM	
United States	July 5, 2000	Rhythmic contemporary; contemporary hit radio	Republic; Universal	
