= Ghost in the Shell (2017 film) =

Film by Rupert Sanders

- Theatrical release poster
- Directed by: Rupert Sanders
- Screenplay by: Jamie Moss; William Wheeler; Ehren Kruger
- Based on: Ghost in the Shell by Masamune Shirow
- Produced by: Avi Arad; Ari Arad; Steven Paul; Michael Costigan
- Starring: Scarlett Johansson; Takeshi Kitano; Michael Pitt; Pilou Asbæk; Chin Han; Juliette Binoche
- Cinematography: Jess Hall
- Edited by: Neil Smith; Billy Rich
- Music by: Clint Mansell; Lorne Balfe
- Production companies: Paramount Pictures; Amblin Partners; DreamWorks Pictures; Reliance Entertainment; Arad Productions; Steven Paul Productions
- Distributed by: Paramount Pictures
- Release dates: March 16, 2017 (Shinjuku); March 31, 2017 (United States)
- Running time: 107 minutes
- Countries: United States; Hong Kong; China
- Languages: English; Japanese
- Budget: $110 million
- Box office: $169.8 million

Ghost in the Shell is a 2017 cyberpunk action thriller film directed by Rupert Sanders and written by Jamie Moss, William Wheeler, and Ehren Kruger. It is the first live-action film adaptation based on the Japanese Ghost in the Shell franchise envisioned by Masamune Shirow, and stars Scarlett Johansson, Takeshi Kitano, Michael Pitt, Pilou Asbæk, Chin Han, and Juliette Binoche. Set in an ultramodern near future when the line between humans and robots is blurring, the plot follows Major Mira Killian, a cyborg supersoldier who attempts to stop a mysterious terrorist and investigate her past.

Filming for Ghost in the Shell took place in New Zealand at Stone Street Studios from February to June 2016, with additional filming in Hong Kong that June. The film premiered in Tokyo on March 16, 2017, and was released in the United States on March 31, 2017, in IMAX, 3D, IMAX 3D, and 4DX. It grossed $169.8 million worldwide against a production budget of $110 million. Ghost in the Shell received mixed reviews, with praise for its cast performances, visual style, action sequences, cinematography and musical score, but criticism for its plot and lack of character development. The casting of non-Asian actors (particularly Johansson in the lead role) drew accusations of racism and whitewashing in the United States, although Mamoru Oshii, the director of the original anime film, stated that there was no basis for this accusation.

== Plot ==
In the near future, humans are augmented with cybernetic improvements such as superhuman strength. Megacorporation Hanka Robotics establishes a secret project to manufacture an artificial body, or "shell", that can integrate a human brain rather than an AI. Mira Killian, the sole survivor of a cyberterrorist attack which killed her parents, is chosen as the test subject after her body is damaged beyond repair. Over the objections of her designer Dr. Ouelet, Hanka Robotics CEO, Cutter, decides to use Killian as a counter-terrorism operative.

A year later, Killian has attained the rank of Major in the counter-terrorism bureau Section 9, working alongside operatives Batou and Togusa under Chief Daisuke Aramaki. Killian, who experiences hallucinations that Ouelet dismisses as glitches, is troubled as she doesn't clearly remember her past. The team thwarts a terrorist attack on a Hanka business conference, and Killian destroys a robotic geisha after the robot kills a hostage. After learning that the geisha was hacked by an unknown entity known as Kuze, Killian breaks protocol and "dives" into its AI for answers. The entity attempts a counter-hack, and Batou is forced to disconnect her. They trace the hacker to a yakuza nightclub, where they are lured into a trap. An explosion destroys Batou's eyes and damages Killian's body. Cutter is enraged by Killian's actions, and threatens to have Section 9 shut down unless Aramaki keeps her in line.

Kuze tracks down Section 9's Hanka consultant, Dr. Dahlin, and kills her. The team links her murder to the deaths of other senior company researchers and realize that Ouelet is the next target. Kuze takes control of two sanitation workers and sends them to kill Ouelet. Now with cybernetic eyes, Batou kills one while the repaired Killian subdues the other. While they interrogate the worker, Kuze speaks through him before compelling him to commit suicide. Togusa traces the hack to a secret location, where the team discovers a large number of humans mentally linked as a makeshift signal network. Killian is captured and Kuze reveals himself as a failed Hanka test subject from the same project that created Killian, where he urges her to question her own memories and to stop taking her medication as it actually helps to block her memories. Kuze then frees her and escapes.

Killian confronts Ouelet, who admits that 98 test subjects died before Killian, and that her memories are implanted. Cutter has decided that Killian is a liability and orders Ouelet to kill her after she returns to Hanka Robotics. Instead, Ouelet gives Killian an address and helps her escape. Cutter kills Ouelet, but blames Killian, saying that she has gone rogue. He informs Aramaki and the team that Killian must be terminated. Killian follows the address to an apartment occupied by a widowed mother, who reveals that her daughter Motoko Kusanagi ran away from home a year ago and was arrested; while in custody, Motoko "took her own life." Killian leaves and contacts Aramaki, who allows Cutter to remotely eavesdrop on their conversation.

Batou, Togusa and Aramaki eliminate Cutter's men trying to ambush them, while Killian follows her memories to the hideaway where Motoko was last seen. She and Kuze meet and recall their past lives as anti-augmentation radicals who were abducted by Hanka as test subjects. Cutter deploys a "spider-tank" to kill them. Kuze nearly dies before Killian is able to tear out the tank's Motor Control Center, losing an arm in the process. Mortally wounded, Kuze asks Killian to join him in leaving this world, but Killian declines. Kuze tells Killian he will always be with her in her ghost, then fades out. A Hanka sniper shoots Kuze in the head. Batou and the team rescue Killian, while Aramaki executes Cutter with Killian's consent. The next day, now repaired and embracing her true identity as the Japanese Motoko, Killian reconnects with her mother and returns to work with Section 9.

== Cast ==
- Scarlett Johansson as Major Motoko Kusanagi / Mira Killian
  - Kaori Yamamoto as young Motoko Kusanagi
- "Beat" Takeshi Kitano as Chief Daisuke Aramaki
- Michael Pitt as Hideo Kuze / Puppet Master
  - Andrew Morris as young Hideo Kuze
- Pilou Asbæk as Batou
- Chin Han as Togusa
- Lasarus Ratuere as Carlos Ishikawa
- Juliette Binoche as Dr. Ouelet
- Peter Ferdinando as Cutter
- Kaori Momoi as Hairi, Motoko's mother
- Danusia Samal as Ladriya
- Anamaria Marinca as Dr. Dahlin
- Michael Wincott as Dr. Osmond (uncredited)
- Yutaka Izumihara as Saito
- Tawanda Manyimo as Borma
- Daniel Henshall as Skinny Man
- Rila Fukushima as a geisha robot
- Chris Obi as Ambassador
- Adwoa Aboah as Lia
- Pete Teo as Tony
- Hugh Han as Data Host
- Tricky (deleted scene)

In the Japanese dub, Atsuko Tanaka, Akio Ōtsuka and Kōichi Yamadera reprise the roles they played in the Mamoru Oshii films and the Stand Alone Complex television series.

== Production ==
In 2008, DreamWorks Pictures (who had handled American theatrical distribution of Ghost in the Shell 2: Innocence through its Go Fish Pictures banner) and Steven Spielberg acquired the rights to produce a live-action film adaptation of the original manga. Avi Arad and Steven Paul were later confirmed as producers, with Jamie Moss set to write the screenplay. In October 2009, it was announced that Laeta Kalogridis had replaced Moss as writer. On January 24, 2014, it was reported that Rupert Sanders would direct the film, with the screenplay now written by William Wheeler. Wheeler worked on the script for approximately a year and a half, later saying, "It's a vast enterprise. I think I was second or third in the mix, and I know there have been at least six or seven writers." Jonathan Herman also worked on the screenplay. Ultimately, credit for the screenplay was given to Moss, William Wheeler and Ehren Kruger.

On September 3, 2014, Margot Robbie was reported as being in early talks for the lead role. On October 16, it was announced that DreamWorks had made a $10 million offer to Scarlett Johansson for the lead role, after Robbie had chosen to play Harley Quinn in Suicide Squad, which is another live-action film adaptation of a comic book. In May 2015, Paramount Pictures agreed to co-produce and co-finance the film. On November 10, 2015, Pilou Asbæk was cast in the role of Batou. According to TheWrap, Matthias Schoenaerts was previously circling the role that went to Asbæk. On November 19, 2015, it was reported that Sam Riley was in early talks to play the villain role Kuze, leader of dangerous criminals and extremists, though on February 4, 2016, Variety reported that Michael Pitt had entered talks for the role. On March 3, 2016, TheWrap reported that Japanese actor Takeshi Kitano had been cast as Daisuke Aramaki, the founder and leader of the elite unit Section 9, tasked with protecting the world from the most dangerous technological threats.

In April 2016, the full cast was announced, including Juliette Binoche, Chin Han, Lasarus Ratuere and Kaori Momoi. In May 2016, Rila Fukushima was cast in a role. Filming wrapped in New Zealand on June 3, 2016. Filming also took place in the Yau Ma Tei and Jordan areas of Hong Kong, around Pak Hoi Street and Woosung Street on June 7, 8 and 10 or 14–16. The score was recorded at Synchron Stage Vienna in Austria.

== Release ==
Ghost in the Shell was originally scheduled for release on April 14, 2017, by Walt Disney Studios Motion Pictures through their Touchstone Pictures banner. The film was part of DreamWorks' distribution deal with the Walt Disney Studios, which began in 2009. In April 2015, Disney moved the film's North American release date to March 31, 2017, with Paramount Pictures handling international distribution. However, it was reported in September 2015 that DreamWorks and Disney would not renew their distribution deal, which was set to expire in August 2016. In January 2016, Disney dropped the film from its slate after DreamWorks finalized their distribution deal with Universal Pictures, via their new parent company Amblin Partners, in December 2015. Disney's distribution rights for the film were transferred completely to Paramount instead of Universal, with Paramount retaining Disney's release date of March 31, 2017. The film was not screened for critics before its release.

=== Box office ===
Ghost in the Shell grossed $40.5 million in the United States and Canada, and $129.2 million in other territories, for a worldwide gross of $169.8 million, against a production budget of $110 million. In North America, Ghost in the Shell opened alongside The Boss Baby (which was produced by DreamWorks' former animation division) and The Zookeeper's Wife, and was projected to gross around $25 million from 3,440 theaters in its opening weekend. It made $1.8 million from Thursday night previews and $7.7 million on Friday, which includes the preview number. The film opened to $19 million, finishing third at the box office, behind The Boss Baby and Beauty and the Beast. Deadline Hollywood attributed the poor opening to below-average critical reviews, an unclear marketing campaign, and no social media presence by Johansson. In its second weekend, the film grossed $7.4 million, dropping 60.4% and finishing 5th at the box office.

Kyle Davies, domestic distribution chief for Paramount, felt the controversy around the casting had damaged reviews, and said: "...you're always trying to thread that needle between honoring the source material and mak[ing] a movie for a mass audience. That's challenging, but clearly the reviews didn't help." Conversely, Deadline argued that the negative critical assessment was due to the film being "cold, boring, thoughtless, and the same old next to its futuristic ancestors The Matrix and Blade Runner", and suggested that Paramount held the film from review because they "knew they had a lame duck".

Japanese box office reception since the official release in the country, on April 7, was more positive, earning $3.3 million during its first three days in theaters. In Japan, Ghost in the Shell made it to second place, just behind Sing. In China, the film debuted at number one, grossing in $22.1 million and claiming the spot from Kong: Skull Island, which had held it for three weeks. It performed below already muted expectations, leading to the Chinese media calling it a flop.

=== Critical response ===
On Rotten Tomatoes, the film has an approval rating of 42%, based on 300 reviews, with an average rating of 5.50/10. The website's critical consensus reads: "Ghost in the Shell boasts cool visuals and a compelling central performance from Scarlett Johansson, but the end result lacks the magic of the movie's classic source material." On Metacritic, the film has a score of 52 out of 100, based on 42 critics, indicating "mixed or average" reviews. Audiences polled by CinemaScore gave the film an average grade of "B" on an A+ to F scale.

Justin Chang of the Los Angeles Times praised the film's visuals and production: "Some of that ravishment arrives courtesy of the movie's setting, a stunning pan-Asian metropolis that makes boldly inventive use of the Hong Kong skyline, its tightly stacked buildings tricked out with enormous holographic billboards. (The cinematography and production design, both staggering, are by Jess Hall and Jan Roelfs, respectively.)" Michael Phillips of Chicago Tribune gave the film 3/4 and said: "This isn't jokey, quippy science fiction; true to the source material, it's fairly grave about the implications of an android-dominated culture, though of course Ghost in the Shell is also about giant mecha spiders equipped with machine guns."

Richard Roeper of the Chicago Sun-Times gave the film 2.5 out of 4 stars, saying: "Just about every scene in Ghost in the Shell is a visual wonder to behold—and you'll have ample time to soak in all that background eye candy, because the plot machinations and the action in the foreground are largely of the ho-hum retread variety." Evan Narcisse of io9 commented that the film failed to capture the feel of the source material, with the biggest problem being the Major asking the wrong sort of existential questions about herself.

Cecilia D'Anastasio of Kotaku commented on the film's failure to adhere to the source material: "Somebody misjudged how poorly American superhero movie tropes would map onto Ghost in the Shell ... [the] final scene tried to do that 'satisfying our need for closure' thing American directors think is kind, but is actually condescending." Brian Truitt of USA Today gave the film 1.5/4, stating: "Ghost in the Shell is a defective mess with lifeless characters, missed chances for thematic exploration and a minefield of political incorrectness."

Manohla Dargis of The New York Times expressed disappointment at the absence of the original's "big, human, all-too-human questions" in contrast to the retention of action clichés, such as chases and gun fights. Dargis also criticized the absence of the unique setting, stating that "The original manga takes place in what's described as a "strange corporate conglomerate-state called 'Japan'", while this movie unwinds nowhere in particular, just a universal megalopolis filled with soaring gray towers."

Nicholas Barber of the BBC described the film as "conceptually and visually breathtaking", an elaborately designed and detailed dystopia which seems disturbingly real.

Peter Suderman of Vox and Emily Yoshida of Vulture criticized the removal of philosophical ideas from the story, feeling the movie westernized the story and changed the search for the idea of a soul to finding individuality and memories. Hanns-Georg Rodek of Die Welt praised the film for being an action movie that for once does not throw philosophy overboard.

James Hadfield of The Japan Times argued that the film missed the mark, but was better than Hollywood's previous attempts at adapting anime for the big screen.

=== Home media ===
Ghost in the Shell was released by Paramount Home Entertainment on digital on July 7, 2017, and on Ultra HD Blu-ray, Blu-ray 3D, Blu-ray and DVD on July 25, 2017. The film was number two in the Top 20 NPD VideoScan First Alert chart and the Top 10 Home Media Magazine rental chart in the week ended July 20, 2017. As of January 2022, the film has grossed $13.1 million from DVD and Blu-ray sales.

== Casting criticism ==
The casting of Scarlett Johansson as Major Mira Killian/Motoko Kusanagi brought accusations of whitewashing. Pavan Shamdasani of Asia Times wrote: "The original is about as Asian as things get: Japanese cult manga, ground-breaking anime, Hong Kong-inspired locations, Eastern philosophy-based story. Most of that's been downright ignored with its big-screen adaptation, and Scarlett Johansson's casting as the dark-haired, obviously originally Asian lead sent netizens into a rage." In April 2016, ScreenCrush reported that the filmmakers had commissioned the use of CGI and other visual effects testing to alter Johansson's appearance to make her appear East Asian, spurring further backlash. Paramount stated the tests were short-lived and did not involve Johansson. Some fans and industry employees argued that the controversy was a symptom of Hollywood's fear that casting non-white actors would bring less profit. Marc Bernardin of the Los Angeles Times wrote that "the only race Hollywood cares about is the box office race."

In Japan, many fans were surprised that the casting had sparked controversy. One fan felt that the appearance of the protagonist was immaterial due to the franchise's themes of self-identity and the blurring of artificial and natural bodies. Others pointed out that casting any actress of non-Japanese Asian descent (such as Chinese), may have been more controversial in the country. The Hollywood Reporter spoke to a group of female Japanese-American actors, including Keiko Agena, about the film; the actresses argued that Japanese natives are not upset by the film because of Western beauty standards held in Japan. According to Justin Charity of Ringer, "your average Japanese citizen's outlook on diversity is much less influenced by pluralism than the outlooks of many Asian Americans, who live in a country where popular culture rarely represents them well, if at all. Hence, many Japanese Americans may find Johansson's casting in a Ghost in the Shell movie distressing, while native Japanese observers make nothing of it."

Paramount released a featurette of Mamoru Oshii, director of the anime films, visiting the studio, in which he says that Johansson exceeded his expectations for the role. Oshii told IGN that the Major uses an assumed body and name, "so there is no basis for saying that an Asian actress must portray her... I can only sense a political motive from the people opposing it, and I believe artistic expression must be free from politics." During a launch event in Tokyo, director Rupert Sanders said of Johansson: "There are very few actresses with 20 years' experience who have the cyberpunk ethic already baked in. I stand by my decision—she's the best actress of her generation." Addressing the controversy, producer Steven Paul referred to the film's setting as "an international world" with characters of numerous nationalities.

Sam Yoshiba, director of the international business division at Kodansha's Tokyo headquarters, which holds the rights to the Ghost in the Shell series, said, "Looking at her career so far, I think Scarlett Johansson is well cast. She has the cyberpunk feel. And we never imagined it would be a Japanese actress in the first place ... This is a chance for a Japanese property to be seen around the world." Johansson said of the backlash, "I certainly would never presume to play another race of a person. Diversity is important in Hollywood, and I would never want to feel like I was playing a character that was offensive. Also, having a franchise with a female protagonist driving it is such a rare opportunity. Certainly, I feel the enormous pressure of that—the weight of such a big property on my shoulders."

The film attracted further criticism for its ending, which reveals that Johansson's character was originally a Japanese girl. The Media Action Network for Asian Americans accused Johansson of lying when she said she would never play the role of a person of a different race than her own. Japanese-American actress Ai Yoshihara, speaking to The Hollywood Reporter, said she felt the twist was "white people trying to justify the casting". Another Japanese-American actress, Atsuko Okatsuka, said, "Hanka Robotics [the corporation in the film] is making a being that's the best of human and the best of robotics. For some reason, the best stuff they make happens to be white."

During the opening monologue for the 2019 Golden Globe Awards, co-host Sandra Oh alluded to the issue of whitewashing in Hollywood by joking that Crazy Rich Asians (2018) was "the first studio film with an Asian-American lead since Ghost in the Shell and Aloha".

== Accolades ==
The film was nominated in two categories for the Hollywood Post Alliance (HPA) Awards, and was also nominated for the "Most Innovative Advertising" category at the Motion Picture Sound Editors' Golden Reel Awards. It won the 12th annual HPA Award for "Color Grading".

The film was on the Academy Awards shortlist for the category of Visual Effects, and was shortlisted for Hair and Makeup, but was not nominated for either category.

It was also nominated for Best Contemporary Make-up by the Make-Up and Hair Guild. On October 23, 2018, the film's composer Lorne Balfe received the "Top Film Score" award at the ASCAP London Music Awards.

== Possible sequel ==
Johansson discussed the possibility of a sequel before the film's release, and said she would do it on the condition that Sanders return as director. Sanders also expressed interest in a sequel as well.

== In other media ==
Taylor Swift's music video for "...Ready for It?" referenced scenes from the film.

== See also ==
- Portrayal of East Asians in Hollywood
- Postcyberpunk

== Bibliography ==
- 2017: David S. Cohen: The Art of Ghost in the Shell, Titan Books, ISBN 978-1785655272
- 2017: James Swallow & Abbie Bernstein: Ghost in the Shell: The Official Movie Novelization, Titan Books, ISBN 978-1785657528
