= Chris Brann =

American electronic music producer and remixer

- Also known as: Wamdue Project; Ananda Project
- Born: Chris Brann; March 25, 1972 (age 53)
- Origin: Atlanta, Georgia, United States
- Genres: House
- Occupations: Electronic musician, DJ, record producer
- Years active: 1994–present
- Labels: Studio !K7, Peacefrog, Om Records

Chris Brann (born March 25, 1972) is an American electronic music producer and remixer. He was born in Atlanta, Georgia. Brann is known for his work under the monikers Wamdue Project and Ananda Project.

== Career ==
Chris Brann teamed up with DJ Deep C (Chris Clark) and Udoh (Chris Udoh) in 1994. The trio started producing tracks together under the name Wamdue Kids, releasing house music EPs on Kelli Hand Detroit label Acacia Records, starting with the "Wamdue Kids #1" 12 inch in 1995. The trio remained together until 2000, releasing tracks under the names Wam Kidz and Wambonix. Since then, Brann has worked alone as a producer, employing vocalists and instrumentalists according to his needs. Vocalists Gaelle Adisson and Terrance Downs, in particular, have been regular contributors to many of Brann's tracks.

While still affiliated with Clark and Udoh, Brann started producing tracks on his own, using a variety of names, the most prolific of which are Wamdue Project, Ananda Project and P'Taah. Brann has mentioned he finds house music too easy to create, and has experimented creating music with influences from many subgenres of electronic music, such as deep house, downtempo, techno and drum and bass.

Chris Brann is better known for the hit "King of My Castle", released in 1997 under the name Wamdue Project. Originally produced by Brann as a downtempo piece, it achieved worldwide fame thanks to a remix by Roy Malone in house form. "King of My Castle" sold two million copies worldwide and is reportedly the best-selling single ever for the Strictly Rhythm label, as well as topping the charts in the United Kingdom, and peaking within the top ten of the charts in countries including Denmark, France and Germany in 1999. A follow-up Wamdue Project single, "Where Do We Go", hit number nine on the Hot Dance Music/Club Play chart in 1998. One more single ("You're The Reason") achieved success in Germany and the United Kingdom, in lower chart regions (No. 55) and (No. 39). A 2000 re-release of "King of My Castle", with new remixes, hit the top spot the following year.

Wamdue Project appeared on the initial nominations list for 'Best British Newcomer', at the 2000 Brit Awards, before embarrassed organisers were forced to withdraw the nomination on account of Brann's American nationality.

== Discography ==
=== Albums ===
Chris Brann

- 1997 Deep Fall
- 2001 No Room For Form - Volume 01

Wamdue Project

- 1996 Resource Toolbook Volume One
- 1998 Program Yourself
- 1999 Best Of
- 1999 Compendium

Ananda Project

- 2000 Release
- 2001 Re-Release
- 2003 Morning Light
- 2005 Relight
- 2007 Fire Flower
- 2008 Night Blossom
- 2011 Truth (Japan Only Release)*
- 2013 Beautiful Searching

Wamdue Kids
All are collaborations with Deep C and Chris Udoh

- 1996 These Branching Moments
- 1996 Wamdue Works

P'Taah

- 1999 Compressed Light
- 2001 De'compressed
- 2003 Staring At The Sun
- 2011 Perfumed Silence

=== Singles ===
Chris Brann

- 1995 "Detroit vs. Atlanta"
- 1997 "Smuthullet EP"
- 1999 "No Room For Form"
- 2001 "So In Love EP"
- 2003 "No Room For Form EP"
- 2004 "Journey To The Centre"

Wamdue Project

- 1996 "Breakdown/In Love With You"
- 1996 "Get High On The Music"
- 1996 "The Deep EP"
- 1997 "King of My Castle", with Gaelle Adisson
- 1998 "Program Yourself EP"
- 1998 "Where Do We Go"
- 1998 "You're The Reason", with Victoria Frigerio
- 2000 "King Of My Castle (2000 Remixes)", with Gaelle Addison
- 2004 "Home Planet"
- 2006 "Forgiveness" ft. Jonathan Mendelsohn
- 2007 "Washes Over You", with Heather Johnson
- 2008 "King Of My Castle (2008 Mixes)"
- 2010 "Paths", with Jessica Tonder

The Ananda Project

- 1998 "Cascades Of Colour EP", with Gaelle Addison
- 1999 "Cascades Of Colour", with Gaelle Addison
- 1999 "Straight Magic"
- 2000 "Cascades Of Colour 2000", with Gaelle Addison
- 2000 "Glory Glory", with Terrance Downs
- 2001 "Bahia/Expand Your Mind"
- 2001 "Falling For You", with Terrance Downs
- 2002 "Breaking Down"
- 2002 "Justice, Mercy"
- 2003 "I Hear You Dreaming", with Heather Johnson and Terrance Downs
- 2003 "Can You Find The Heart", with Nicola Hitchcock
- 2004 "Big Boat/Cascades Of Colour (Remixes)", with Terrance Downs and Gaelle Adisson
- 2004 "ICU"
- 2004 "Kiss Kiss Kiss", with Heather Johnson and Terrance Downs
- 2004 "Rain Down/Breaking Down", with Heather Johnson
- 2005 "Shouldn't Have Left Me", with Terrance Shelton
- 2006 "Secrets", with Marta Gazman
- 2006 "Suite Dreams", with Lydia Rhodes
- 2007 "Into the Sunrise", with Terrance Downs
- 2007 "Fireworks/Universal Love", with Terrance Downs and Kai Martin
- 2007 "Let Love Fly", with Heather Johnson
- 2007 "Free Me/Space And Time", with Heidi Levo
- 2007 "Stalk You"
- 2008 "Where The Music Takes You/Stay As You Are", with Kai Martin

P'Taah

- 1999 "Compressed Light EP"
- 2000 "No One, No How, Never"
- 2000 "Remixes"
- 2002 "Staring At The Sun", with Sylvia Gordon
- 2003 "Become Who You Are/Nobody Knows"
- 2003 "The Oldest Story", with Terrance Downs
- 2011 "Perfumed Silence"

Wamdue Kids
All are collaborations with Deep C and Chris Udoh

- 1995 "Higher EP"
- 1995 "Disaster EP"
- 1995 "I Will EP"
- 1995 "Deep Dreams EP"
- 1995 "This Is What I Live For"
- 1996 "Memory EP"
- 1996 "Memory and Forgetting"
- 1996 "Ohm"
- 1996 "Panic EP"
- 1996 "The Digital Rawhide EP"

Wambonix
All are collaborations with Deep C and Chris Udoh

- 1997 "Wambonix EP"
- 1997 "When You're Alone"
- 1999 "Deep Down"

Wam Kidz
All are collaborations with Deep C and Chris Udoh

- 1997 "In Love Again"
- 1999 "CB's Groove"
- 2000 "Maria"

Other

- 2017 "Conflagration"

Other aliases

- 2000 "Psychic Driving", as Feral
- 2000 "Mars Is A Giant Flat For Rent", as P'tang
- 2000 "Past And Future", as Santal
- 2001 "Be With You", as Santal, with Titus Marshall
- 2002 "Delilah (Be Strong 4 Me)", as Delilah, with Heather Johnson
- 2002 "1-2-3 Miami", as Jackass & Mule, with Tommie Sunshine
- 2003 "Be Strong 4 Me 2003", as Delilah, with Heather Johnson

== See also ==
- List of number-one dance hits (United States)
- List of artists who reached number one on the US Dance chart
