= Tarusuke Shingaki =

Japanese voice actor

- 新垣 樽助
- Born: Masaaki Shingaki; Kumejima, Okinawa, Japan
- Occupation: Voice actor
- Years active: 2000–present
- Agent: Mausu Promotion
- Height: 172 cm (5 ft 8 in)

Masaaki Shingaki (新垣 正明, Shingaki Masaaki), better known by his stage name Tarusuke Shingaki (新垣 樽助, Shingaki Tarusuke), is a Japanese voice actor. He is affiliated with Mausu Promotion. Shingaki's roles include Kariya Matou in Fate/Zero, Eishirō Kite in The Prince of Tennis II, Togusa in Ghost in the Shell: Arise, Lemillion in My Hero Academia, Yashiro in Twittering Birds Never Fly: The Clouds Gather, and Yugo Kakitani in Vivy: Fluorite Eye's Song.

== Filmography ==
=== Anime series ===
List of voice performances in animated television series
Year	Title	Role	Notes	Ref.
2008	Vampire Knight: Guilty	Rido Kuran		
2009	Fresh Pretty Cure!	Daisuke Chinen		
2011–12	Fate/Zero	Kariya Matou		
2012	The Prince of Tennis II	Eishirō Kite		
2015	Ghost in the Shell: Arise – Alternative Architecture	Togusa		
2016–19	Bungo Stray Dogs	Nathaniel H.		
2018–25	My Hero Academia	Mirio Togata (Lemillion)		
2018	100 Sleeping Princes and the Kingdom of Dreams	Frost		
2018	Ingress	Christopher Brandt		
2019	Afterlost	Eiji (Researcher)		
2020	Noblesse	Cadis Etrama di Raizel		
2020	The Day I Became a God	Daichi Narukami		
2021	Vivy: Fluorite Eye's Song	Yugo Kakitani		
2021	Eden	S566		
2022	Orient	Seiroku Inukawa		
2022	The Prince of Tennis II: U-17 World Cup	Eishirō Kite		
2022	VazzRock the Animation	Takaaki		
2023	The Aristocrat's Otherworldly Adventure: Serving Gods Who Go Too Far	Eric		
2023	Under Ninja	Katō		
2024	Frieren: Beyond Journey's End	Genau	Also Season 2 (2026)	
2024	Touken Ranbu Kai: Kyoden Moyuru Honnōji	Heshikiri Hasebe		
2025	Okinawa de Suki ni Natta Ko ga Hōgen Sugite Tsurasugiru	Narrator		
2026	Eren the Southpaw	Shun Rukawa		
2027	Bless	Hikaru Oya		

=== Anime films ===
List of voice performances in animated feature films
Year	Title	Role	Notes	Ref.
2015	Ghost in the Shell: The New Movie	Togusa		
2020	Twittering Birds Never Fly: The Clouds Gather	Yashiro		
2022	Toku Touken Ranbu: Hanamaru ~Setsugetsuka~	Chiyoganemaru		

=== Original video animation ===
List of voice performances in original video animations (OVAs)
Year	Title	Role	Notes	Ref.
2006	The Prince of Tennis: National Tournament Arc	Eishirō Kite		
2013–15	Ghost in the Shell: Arise	Togusa		
2015	Yona of the Dawn	King Hiryū		
2020	Pokémon: Twilight Wings	Milo		
2021	Twittering Birds Never Fly: Don't Stay Gold	Yashiro		

=== Video games ===
List of voice performances in video games
Year	Title	Role	Notes	Ref.
2016	Street Fighter V	Rashid		
2023	Street Fighter 6	Rashid		

=== Audio dramas ===
List of voice performances in audio dramas
Year	Title	Role	Notes	Ref.
2013–present	Twittering Birds Never Fly	Yashiro	Volumes 1–7	

=== Dubbing ===
==== Live-action ====
- Back to the Future (2014 BS Japan edition) (Biff Tannen (Thomas F. Wilson))
- Back to the Future Part II (2018 BS Japan edition) (Biff Tannen / Griff Tannen / Gertrude Tannen (Thomas F. Wilson))
- Back to the Future Part III (2018 BS Japan edition) (Buford "Mad Dog" Tannen (Thomas F. Wilson))
- Bel Ami (David Choi (Lee Jang-woo))
- Blue Story (Killy / Kiron (Khali Best))
- The Butler (2016 BS Japan edition) (Louis Gaines (David Oyelowo))
- Hawaii Five-0 (Chin Ho Kelly (Daniel Dae Kim))
- The Hundred-Foot Journey (Hassan Kadam (Manish Dayal))
- The Physician (Rob Cole (Tom Payne))
- Piranha 3DD (Kyle (Chris Zylka))
- Testament of Youth (Roland Leighton (Kit Harington))
- Venom: The Last Dance
- War Horse (Albert Narracott (Jeremy Irvine))
- Welcome to the Jungle (Chris (Adam Brody))
- Zack Snyder's Justice League (Ryan Choi (Zheng Kai))
- The Zone of Interest (Rudolf Höss (Christian Friedel))
- Yo soy Betty, la fea (Armando Mendoza (Jorge Enrique Abello))

==== Animation ====
- Young Justice (Superboy/ Conner Kent)
- Trolls World Tour (Biggie)
- Nimona (Ballister Blackheart)
