= Transient (album) =

2004 studio album by Gaelle Adisson

Studio album by Gaelle
- Released: November 16, 2004
- Recorded: 2000–2004
- Genre: House; R&B; soul; electronica; downtempo
- Length: 54:20
- Label: Naked Music
- Producer: Gaelle; Eric Stamile

Transient is the debut studio album by American singer-songwriter Gaelle Adisson.

== Track listing ==
1. "Falling" – 6:15
2. "Parkway" – 4:13
3. "Give It Back" – 4:23
4. "Fade Away" – 4:00
5. "Haiti (Interlude)" – 2:35
6. "Love U More" – 4:03
7. "Repetition" – 5:28
8. "Shape Shifting" – 2:14
9. "Transient" – 4:59
10. "Rain" – 5:30
11. "Separate Rooms" – 5:11
12. "Moonsglow" – 5:29

== Personnel ==
- Dave Boonshoft – executive producer
- Gaelle – vocals, background vocals, composer, producer
- Emily Lazar – mastering
- Eric Stamile – audio engineer, mixing, producer, programming
- Brian Turner – drum loop
- Britt Turner – loops
- Kebe Williams – saxophone
- Ede Wright – guitar

== Reception ==
A BBC Music review commented "Her dry and introspective tone complement[s] her impassioned lyrics, and perfectly suit[s] the cool jazz backing that makes up the majority of this voyage of self-discovery."
