= List of Ghost in the Shell: Arise – Alternative Architecture episodes =

The key promotional graphic for Ghost in the Shell: Arise – Alternative Architecture

Ghost in the Shell: Arise – Alternative Architecture (攻殻機動隊ARISE ALTERNATIVE ARCHITECTURE, Kōkaku Kidōtai Araizu Orutanatibu Ākitekucha; "Mobile Armoured Riot Police: Arise – Alternative Architecture"), officially abbreviated as Ghost in the Shell AAA, is a 2015 Japanese animated television series, based on Masamune Shirow's manga Ghost in the Shell and the Ghost in the Shell: Arise pentalogy. The episodes were recompiled from the pentalogy, and therefore share the same cast and crew of Kazuchika Kise as director, Tow Ubukata as writer and Cornelius as composer. AAA is animated by Production I.G, and began airing in Japan on April 5, 2015, broadcasting from the Tokyo MX, KBS, Sun TV, TV Aichi, HTB, OX, SBS, TVQ and BS11 networks.

The opening theme is "Anata o tamotsu mono" by Maaya Sakamoto (who also plays the role of Major Kusanagi) and Cornelius.

== Episodes ==
No.	Title	Original release date
1	"Ghost Stands Alone, Part 1"; Transliteration: "Ghost Stands Alone Zenpen" (Japanese: Ghost Stands Alone 前編)	April 5, 2015
Protesters start gathering in Niihama, calling for the government of Japan to return stolen water to war orphans. Major Motoko Kusanagi, a contractor for Public Security, stands above a building watching the protests. She claims that "it's starting" as all lifelines, surveillance systems, door locks and other electronically controlled systems are dominated by Section 9. Chief of Public Security Daisuke Aramaki leads his AI intelligence team to analyze the 4022 people isolated in that area. He hears complaints from other departments in Public Security but dismisses them as he tracks down a recently mobilized Qhardi group. Vice-Minister Kitahara contacts Aramaki and he fills her in on the details, to which he specifies the Yotsubashi building as the terrorist's target. The Major's team meets for a cyber-briefing, discussing the possible involvement of a high profile hacker named "Fire-Starter". With the help of police, Borma and Paz catch a potential Qhardi agitator in the crowd but note the suspicious lack of weaponry. Suddenly, the police officers overseeing the protest open fire on the crowd, killing multiple civilians and then each other. Ishikawa calls this the biggest Ghost-hack ever, but the Major remarks that there is no tech that allows the control of that many people. She surmises that instead of a hack, this attack was likely a virus. Leaving the cyber-meeting the Major jumps off the roof of the building and activates her optical camouflage. Meanwhile a member of security in the ball room that Kitahara was attending is affected by the virus and shoots her, with the speaker still continuing her speech. The Major appears behind the speaker, Dr. Zhinzhee Bekka Arr Thied, and shoots her with optical camo on covering her identity. She makes her escape running towards the window and leaping out of it. Her audio line is hacked in midair by a female voice telling her that she can't stop Fire-Starter. A helicopter appears and shoots at the Major pushing her body back into the building. Batou calls for Saito to retaliate. Saito activates his infrared vision and snipes the pilot, sending the chopper flying. The Major is okay and runs into the hall, discovering a Logicoma already stationed with optical camo. They defeat another insurgent and escape the building. Back at the scene of the protest every civilian is dead except for a single young girl. Batou and Togusa appear and hold her up but notice that a sniper's crosshair is pointed at her. Batou tackles her to the ground as the Major shows up and is also targeted. She calls for Saito to take the other sniper down but he doesn't catch him in time. The next day the Major is lectured by Aramaki for executing Dr. Thied but she claims that he has no proof. Aramaki doesn't buy her story and questions her ability. Kusanagi then asks for details of the suspect and Aramaki profiles her as Emma Tsuda, a famous game app maker. When the Major says the information isn't enough, Aramaki urges her to join Section 9 for greater oversight and benefits. Suddenly, Colonel Hozumi of army intelligence enters the room and demands "ex-Major" Kusanagi to be taken into captivity on suspicion of Ghost infiltration. Kusanagi corrects her claiming that her intel is outdated and that her rank as Major had been reinstated. Aramaki tells Hozumi that the government does not acknowledge Ghost infiltration as possible, and that Kusanagi has already been transferred from Unit 501 which puts her under his direct authority. Hozumi promises Aramaki that he'll regret this and leaves. With Hozumi's claims in mind, Aramaki approves of Kusanagi's assassination the previous night and assigns the Major's team to the job of escorting Tsuda to Unit 501 for analysis. The team of Kusanagi, Togusa and Batou get in a van and prepare for Unit 501's dissection of Emma Tsuda.
2	"Ghost Stands Alone, Part 2"; Transliteration: "Ghost Stands Alone Kōhen" (Japanese: Ghost Stands Alone 後編)	April 12, 2015
Kusanagi, Batou and Togusa arrive at the 501 headquarters to have Emma's cyberbrain dissected. It is revealed that she is a victim of a failed "Ghost Dubbing" experiment conducted by Special Affairs Colonel Hozumi, binding two Ghosts to Emma's body under a Wizard of Oz-like mental aesthetic. Togusa is infected by a Ghost Hack created by Emma, which lets her escape to a remote location. Hozumi then arrives with her men and supposedly eliminates Emma's body to protect her faction. After Emma's android body emerges from a Harimadara prototype legged-tank, she was destroyed by Kuzan warship while Hozumi is seen escaping via helicopter. Section 9 manages to shoot it down and the Major's team is awarded "special authority".
3	"Ghost Pain, Part 1"; Transliteration: "Ghost Pain Zenpen" (Japanese: Ghost Pain 前編)	April 19, 2015
Motoko Kusanagi, an agent of the 501 Organization, arrives at a Japanese airport where a suited man gives her a memory drive given to him by "the unit". She syncs it through and is jolted back in shock before carrying on as usual. Later, we see Public Security Chief Aramaki leading an investigation unit to unearth the body of Lt. Col. Mamuro, a suspected criminal, from his coffin when they are suddenly met by a questioning Kusanagi. Inside the coffin, they find the body of an unknown female android and are attacked by it. After they destroy it, Kusanagi goes back to the 501 and reports the incident to her superior, Kurtz. The next day, she is approached by Aramaki to take on the Mamuro case for him as a civilian. She is assigned a Logicoma to be her liaison and investigates his death through undercover cop Paz, who tells her that her that a clue is hidden in Maneuver Area 6. She makes her way there and discovers a detective, Togusa, who is also searching around the area. They are both met by a man with glowing prosthetic eyes.
4	"Ghost Pain, Part 2"; Transliteration: "Ghost Pain Kōhen" (Japanese: Ghost Pain 後編)	April 26, 2015
The man awaiting them is Batou the Ranger, who engages in combat with Kusanagi whom he's already met. It turns out to be a misunderstanding due to the Major's waning memory and they are approached by the real culprits who send combat androids after them. Kusanagi, Batou and Togusa make it outside Maneuver Area 6 where the android army comes after them. With the help of the Logicoma and Paz who arrives with a van they escape. They all meet with Aramaki outside in Niihama who explains to Kusanagi that Mamuro's money was sent to her account postmortem, and that the bullet that killed him was identified as hers as well. Togusa of the police force and Batou of the Rangers confirm this through their findings as well. With all signs pointing towards her as the killer, Kusanagi begins to question her own memory. She goes home and realizes from her family photo that she has been implanted with false memories. After investigating the case further, it seems that the incident ties back to Unit 501. She infiltrates the building and is engaged in battle with her rival, Raizo. She takes him down but is interrupted by her superior Kurtz, who comes clean about the 501's involvement in the elimination of Mamuro. Kusanagi's brain was infected with a virus called "Fire-Starter" after she synced with Mamuro's corpse, which caused her continual amnesia. The Major leaves Unit 501 when she learns that she was used as bait. Gaining possession of her own prosthetic body, she is approached by Aramaki for a new investigation team.
5	"Ghost Whispers, Part 1"; Transliteration: "Ghost Whispers Zenpen" (Japanese: Ghost Whispers 前編)	May 3, 2015
Kazuya Soga, a man in custody, is taken to a court to testify for his alleged "crimes against humanity" in the Qhardistani War. Flashbacks to the war show that he is feeding water to a young girl inside of a bunker. He claims that he wants the truth to be made public. Meanwhile, one of a series of mass-produced Logicoma is synced with video footage of Soga's men seeking to prove his innocence. The Major checks up on this unit later and is informed of the fact. Aramaki orders her to investigate this matter. Kusanagi leaves with the Logicoma in question and suspects that it has been implanted with false memories. They enter a highway and are attacked by a van manned by armed men. The Major forces herself in with her motorcycle, spotting Batou the Ranger as the driver. The attackers take advantage of a traffic control error and escape causing multiple car accidents all over the city. Left with no backup, Kusanagi tracks down one of the attackers and holds him up for questioning before being assaulted by an armored tank. She and the Tachikoma defend themselves, but receive a call from someone inside claiming to be an ally. The attacker from earlier, Borma, had gotten up and set up a roadblock. The armored tank turns into a mech and shoots him down, with the woman inside revealing herself as American Special Forces "VV". She offers Kusanagi her aid in exchange for her cooperation. They sync through the web and discuss their plans regarding Soga. Later, a former Soga henchman named Saito is shown playing a game of virtual Russian roulette before being held up by the Major for his suspected involvement with the attackers. He denies taking the job from the attackers due to the low pay, and agrees to help the Major with the case. With the team of Paz, Saito, VV and the Logicoma, Kusanagi leads an assault on the enemy base. They each enter the compound, with Kusanagi and VV entering the main building directly. Soga then Ghost Hacks the Major and promises her that he will make it impossible for her to stop him.
6	"Ghost Whispers, Part 2"; Transliteration: "Ghost Whispers Kōhen" (Japanese: Ghost Whispers 後編)	May 10, 2015
Stuck in a barrier maze, Soga explains that he will reach "Pandora's box" before the Major can stop him. She decides to split herself into several virtual copies and search around the maze for clues inside Soga's memory. The Major finds the day of the Qhardistani War in question. She witnesses his team slaughter the refugees as Soga explains was the 78th Composite Unit's final mission. He is shown to be ordering one of his men to give him a water bottle, which he promptly gives to one of the refugee children who drinks it and smiles at him. However, the Major sees a visual discrepancy in this memory. She attempts to tell Soga that he'd been infiltrated but is cut off of his web. VV forcibly pulls her out of the barrier maze and they both continue to infiltrate the area. Meanwhile, Batou and intelligence officer Ishikawa are shown holding up fellow Intel members before finally receiving hostage money from Home Affairs. Paz appears behind Ishikawa and tries to subdue him, but is grappled out. They fight briefly before VV and the Major arrive to take Ishikawa down. The Major infiltrates Ishikawa's mind and tells him that he's already been infected with a virus, which she decides to vaccinate. Batou meets up with Borma outside and tells him that he's lost contact with Ishikawa. He starts to escape but is stopped by Saito who shoots down his driver with a sniper. However, Batou successfully convinces Saito to join his side after promising to pay him a triple share of the amount he got from Home Affairs. Back in the Intel room, Ishikawa is also shown to change sides to the Major's team and subdues Borma in the process, who also joins them. Now with her expanded team, the Major chases after Batou along a highway. Saito comes to support Batou, shooting off VV's arm, but is taken down by an angered Kusanagi. Batou then takes advantage of a traffic control hack and manages to lose the Major's sight. She sees through the trick thanks to VV's advice and catches up to Batou, nearly eliminating him. She syncs through him and explains the truth of what happened between Soga and the refugees. The girl who he'd given the bottle had actually ambushed and shot him alongside her mother to which he killed them for. After discovering this and starting the infiltration, Soga kills himself in front of Aramaki and other operatives. The Major vaccinates Batou of the virus and promises to help him eradicate the false memories. Believing that it was over, Kusanagi is told by Aramaki that the Pandora infiltration was being sent over a new net. She discovers VV in front of her, who hacks the Major's body to the point of paralysis. VV reveals herself as an android and begins to approach the Major, but is gunned down by Batou and the Logicoma's turret. At the end, the Major releases Batou from incarceration on the condition that he join the Major's squad.
7	"Ghost Tears, Part 1"; Transliteration: "Ghost Tears Zenpen" (Japanese: Ghost Tears 前編)	May 17, 2015
A man wakes up near a dam waterfall carrying a briefcase. He gets up and starts walking when the source of the stream explodes. Later Kusanagi is seen diving in a virtual space with an unknown man, kissing him. She is woken up by Batou through her virtual comm. He asks her if she was using virtual reality and she frustratedly answers that she is on vacation. Offering his condolences, Batou informs her of a terrorist bombing in Nishinouchi, confirming the deaths of multiple high-profile victims as well as the further bombing of the dam. He tells the Major that Section 9 has put them on the case to investigate. The Major accepts the job and gets up from her bed, putting her clothes on. Her boyfriend wakes up next to her and greets her, reminding her not to forget what they discussed. Batou picks up on this conversation and laughs, citing three months in her relationship to be a new record for the Major before she Ghost-hacks him into punching himself. Later, Togusa checks on the body of Detective Naoharu Mizuki, his senior in the police department. Inside his wallet he finds a holographic card for a prosthetic agency called "Mermaid's Legs", with "Akira Hose" written on the back. His colleagues also discover a briefcase nearby that contains prosthetic limbs. The Major's team is then shown holding a cyber-meeting, attempting to track down the perpetrators of the terrorist bombing. When Ishikawa tracks down the location of the leader, Kusanagi makes her way there and attacks him. She hacks through his line and orders all of his allies to back down. Batou and a Logicoma take each member in without a shootout, and the Major orders them to be given to Public Security. However, she becomes infected with a virus from the man she took down. Temporarily disabled, she sits there as the man begins to approach her. Saito tries to snipe him but is hacked by the Major, who only allows him to take a non-lethal shot. The Major grapples herself out of the paralysis but fails to defeat him, leaving Batou to finish the job. The next day, a Qhardi woman named Dr. Zhinzhee Bekka Arr Thied, working for a water machinery company appears in Togusa's office. She claims that the explosion in the dam was a valve malfunction. Back in Section 9 Ishikawa manages to profile the attackers as a Qhardi weapons smuggling group with their goal being to send weapons back to their comrades, but the Major claims that their agenda is a product of the false memories they were infected with. Aramaki enters the room and discusses the matter further, suspecting this to be the work of the Fire-Starter hacker. He reveals to the team that he discovered a clue in the form of the tattoos that each of the terrorists were branded with. It is the symbol for Scylla, a leader of the Qhardi Separatist Army. Ishikawa asks if he is Fire-Starter, but the Major says that he was already killed in the Qhardistan War. Aramaki allows limited access into Section 9's database to find more information. Togusa then shows up to Aramaki's office and fills him on the details of Detective Mizuki's death. Togusa theorizes that he may have been killed after finding proof that Dr. Thied's organization was dealing in weapons smuggling. Aramaki is amused by Togusa's "imagination" and gives him authority to investigate the connections further. He is glad to be given permission and goes to question the owner of the Mermaid Legs card, Akira Hose (who is actually the Major's boyfriend). After Togusa asks about the pair of legs found in the briefcase, Hose tells him he will check on the model and secretly meets with Colonel Hozumi of Army Intelligence. Meanwhile, the Major's team discovers a new clue in the terrorists' hideout.
8	"Ghost Tears, Part 2"; Transliteration: "Ghost Tears Kōhen" (Japanese: Ghost Tears 後編)	May 24, 2015
Akira Hose, Colonel Hozumi and Dr. Thied engage in a cyber meeting plotting conspiracy, where Hose pleads for the release of the Qhardi group that was arrested by the Major's team through Hozumi, in exchange for exclusive data. She agrees and assigns him an "Ariel" unit. Meanwhile, the Major is seen meeting up with Lt. Col. Kurtz who advises her to take down Scylla permanently. When she gets home, she notices that her left leg is still affected by the Fire-Starter virus. She is visited by Hose who reminisces over their first meeting. He remarks that her confusion over the blurred differences between human and machine is what interested him in her from the beginning, and they embrace. The Major's team meets briefly the next day, with Batou noting that she has high heels on. Kusanagi then leaves for a ball where she meets up with Hose for a date. They each discuss the growing changes in human society with the advent of prosthetic bodies and the Ghosts that inhabit them. They come home and lay in bed with each other, but are suddenly interrupted by a hitman who unsuccessfully tries shooting them in their sleep. Hose appears behind him and tells Kusanagi to run. She stays to help him however, and the attacker escapes. She goes to tend to him and apologizes for involving him in the dangerous operation. Later, a melancholic Major is seen sitting in the Public Security headquarters being consoled by Chief Aramaki and Batou. Batou notes that her attacker was a professional despite his failure to kill the two. After confirming Hose's safety, the Major commands her team to search diligently for any traces of Scylla, seemingly making the case personal. Detective Togusa appears and requests the Major for questioning. When he implies that she isn't thinking straight after her lover was attacked, she is angered and picks him up by the collar. Togusa tries to convince her that Akira Hose is too suspiciously connected to the case. Hose is then shown meeting with the rest of the conspirators trying to leave the group, but is forced to remain and "become Scylla" himself. The Major barges into the room where the Qhardi leader is imprisoned and synchs through him, asking him of Hose's identity. He claims that he is the new Scylla and is responsible for giving him the virus that infected the Major to begin with. Convinced, Kusanagi and Batou meet with Togusa to ask him for aid in the operation. Togusa cites Dr. Thied as the most likely suspect for providing arms to the Qhardi group. The Major's team, led by Aramaki, meet with Vice Minister Kitahara to warn her of being a target to the terrorists. One of her men is suddenly affected by the virus and the entire facility is attacked. Hose is then seen giving his data to Kurtz of the 501, who is standing next to Emma Tsuda. He asks for info of Scylla to which she tells him that the information is available in his infected cyberbrain. The Major accepts that Hose is Scylla and tells Batou that she would take care of him. Togusa and Batou then find the warehouse that harbors the prosthetic bombs called "Ariel" but are attacked by the Major's would-be assassin. The Major is then seen holding up Hose, who begins to tell her about his connection to Scylla. However, his body is revealed to be holographic and Kusanagi spots the real Hose outside escaping with Dr. Theid. Batou continues to wrestle with the attacker and questions the Ghost hacking method used against him as the same that the Major uses. The rest of the Major's team is seen dealing with the attack on the Vice Minister's office and the Major tells them that her own cyberbrain was packaged through her time with Hose, and created a copy of. Eventually, Major Kusanagi catches up with Akira Hose who was attempting to board a helicopter. They both raise their guns and approach each other. After multiple shots, they hold their guns at point-blank range. Hose reveals that it was his cyberbrain that was packaged and that his death would save her and her friends. He points the gun at his head instead and claims that he was glad to have met her, calling her Scylla. He shoots and kills himself. Afterwards, Batou explains that the Major was actually Scylla, and that she helped the Qhardi separatists before faking her death. She tells him that she is suffering an identity crisis, not knowing who she actually is. The Major decides to go through another prosthetic surgery to help her feel more individual. Togusa discovers that his superior officer, Mizuki, was also in on the Qhardi scandal with huge sums deposited into his account before death. He is met by Kusanagi outside who asks if he would join her team. Before she gets to finish however, he receives a call from his wife who tells him that she is going through labor with their first child. He runs off to meet her, leaving the Major bewildered.
9	"Pyrophoric Cult, Part 1"; Transliteration: "Pyrophoric Cult Zenpen" (Japanese: Pyrophoric Cult 前編)	June 7, 2015
Before being captured, Hozumi claims that she had successfully packaged the Fire-Starter virus with cyberbrains and could create all the soldiers she wanted. meanwhile an unknown figure uses a translucent sphere to blow up a passenger flight 381 as it flies overhead by exploding an Ariel prosthesis implanted in Tei Musrsaka, an undercover US agent infected with the Fire-Starter virus. When Kusanagi's team go to investigate his apartment because of a link to Fire-Starter, they find US agents are already there. In Aramaki's office Kusanagi meets Jeril, from American Army intelligence who is also hunting the Fire-Starter broker they have code-named Pyromaniac. Kusanagi's team agrees to Aramaki's request to work with them on the condition she can question Hozumi who is also a target of Pyromaniac. Ishikawa finds that Musrsaka was following Galves Garcia, a cyber-drug dealer. As Kusanagi is about to transfer Hozumi from the Army Medical Center to the courthouse, Pyromaniac strikes causing chaos and confusion. Kusanagi traces him to the same building, where they capture a man apparently being used as a proxy.
10	"Pyrophoric Cult, Part 2"; Transliteration: "Pyrophoric Cult Kōhen" (Japanese: Pyrophoric Cult 後編)	June 14, 2015
The prisoner escapes, revealing himself to be the Pyromaniac, and acquiring security codes. Kusanagi deduces that Pyromaniac had inside assistance, confirmed when he attacks the convoy transporting Hozumi from a helicopter gunship. Pyromaniac hacks into Kusanagi from outside and they meet in a virtual world that looks like a Kuzan battlefield. He states that he is a vessel for the Ghosts of Galvez, and Emma, and Murasaka. Kusanagi argues that he's just a construct of false memories of the Fire-Starter virus to eliminate threats to its continued existence and she traps then erases him. In the real world, Pyromaniac also dies, and Kurutsu, head of the 501 Organization, retrieves the translucent sphere from him and dumps his body. Meanwhile Kusanagi's team and the Tachikoma fight off forces controlled by the Fire-Starter virus. In the aftermath, little useful is retrieved from Pyromaniac's cyberbrain and Kusanagi is congratulated by the prime Minister for catching the terrorist who downed flight 381. Elsewhere, Kurutsu quietly states that she has finished refining the virus.

=== Chronological order ===
1. Ghost Pain - introduces Unit 501
2. Ghost Whispers - continues the formation of Section 9
3. Ghost Tears - introduces Dr. Zhinzhee Bekka Arr Thied
4. Ghost Stands Alone - Dr. Zhinzhee Bekka Arr Thied appears again
5. Pyrophoric Cult

== See also ==
- List of Ghost in the Shell: Stand Alone Complex episodes
- List of Ghost in the Shell: S.A.C. 2nd GIG episodes
