= Togusa =

Fictional character from Ghost in the Shell

- Ghost in the Shell character
- Togusa of Section 9, as portrayed in the Stand Alone Complex anime series
- First appearance: Ghost in the Shell #02 "Super Spartan" (1989)
- Created by: Masamune Shirow
- Voiced by: Japanese Kōichi Yamadera (most media) Hirotaka Suzuoki (1997 video game) Tarusuke Shingaki (Arise, The New Movie) Yuichi Nakamura (The Ghost in the Shell TV series) English David Richard Thompson (1995 film, 1997 video game) Crispin Freeman (S.A.C. TV series, Innocence, SAC_2045) Darren Pleavin (S.A.C. TV series [Animax dub]) Trevor Devall (S.A.C. OVAs) Alex Organ (Arise, The New Movie) Nick Apostolides (The Ghost in the Shell TV series)
- Portrayed by: Kentarō Kanesaki (stage play); Chin Han (2017 film)

In-universe information
- Title: Lieutenant
- Affiliations: Public Security Section 9 Keishichō (formerly)

Togusa (Japanese: トグサ) is the second most prominently featured male character in Masamune Shirow's Ghost in the Shell manga and anime series. In Stand Alone Complex, as well as the original Ghost in the Shell film, it is stated that he is the youngest member of Section 9 and the only family man. His voice is provided by Kōichi Yamadera in most of his appearances, while Hirotaka Suzuoki provides his voice in the Ghost in the Shell PlayStation game. Chin Han portrayed Togusa in the 2017 film.

Togusa has not undergone cybernetic replacement in some manner as he had been referred to as a natural (though he does have a cyberbrain). Brought to the team by Daisuke Aramaki from the Keishichō, Togusa is an asset for "his new perspective, human intuition and analytical skills for their investigation of cyborg crimes."

== Conception and creation ==
Section 9 recruited Togusa for his excellent detective work, incorruptible idealism, and his lack of cyberization. The Major's reasoning for his inclusion was that he would add an element of variety and unpredictability to the group. He has a strong love for vintage items, preferring a Mateba revolver over more modern sidearms. In the manga, he is cybernetic like all other members.

=== Design ===
According to character designer Hajime Shimomura, he did the designs of Togusa based on him being the gentle lion. In addition, Shimomura mentions that he was hard to do since his appearance in the manga looks deformed.

Togusa is one of the few humans in Section 9 who hasn't gotten any cybernetic upgrades, and one of the few who doesn't have any military background. This makes him an interesting counterpoint to some of the other characters on the force, and offer a unique outlook. Chin Han, who played Togusa in the live action film, describes him: "Togusa is very interesting in the sense that he is the only member of the team that is wholly human and is proud of it, I think he's the last bastion of the old world. It's reflected in his choice of weaponry, which is the Mateba revolver and of course his choice in the mullet for a hairstyle."

=== Background ===
Togusa is 27 years old, married, and the father of a young daughter. In the S.A.C. universe, he also has a son. Togusa's personality varies somewhat between the manga, movies, and series. In the manga he tends to be very emotional and plagued with feelings of failure; in the films he is savvier but still aware of his inexperience, and in the Stand Alone Complex his personality is a combination of the two. He also tends to be the most emotional and temperamental, getting so outraged at one criminal committing murder right under his nose in an episode of Ghost in the Shell: S.A.C. 2nd GIG he seriously wounded the man and ends up on trial. He seems very friendly with Batou and he was arguably the one who cracked the Laughing Man case.

His history as an uncorrupted detective is one of the reasons he was recruited (as well as his being a family man), to add an element of variety and unpredictability to the team. Togusa is also the only member of Section 9 to have not come from the military as he was from Section 1, which makes him feel somewhat insecure in his abilities at times. He is very fond of his archaic Mateba Autorevolver, opting to use it over the standard-issue Seburo M5 even in the field, citing that it cannot jam and that "six bullets is enough to get the job done", a decision which everyone inquires about occasionally.

== Appearances ==
=== Ghost in the Shell ===
Togusa is introduced in the 1995 film by Mamoru Oshii right at the beginning in a short scene in a surveillance van with Batou, but he is not identified. We get to know him later when he is driving an armored van while Major Motoko Kusanagi dons her police armor in the back. He establishes his newness to the group by asking the Major why she requested he be transferred from the police to Section 9, and the Major answers him by stating that different skills and ideas are necessary in the unit, because homogenization equals death in their line of work. Togusa's police instincts come into play later, when he suspects something untoward involving Section 6, leading up to the theft of The Puppet Master.

=== Ghost in the Shell 2: Innocence ===
GITS2 takes place in the years after the events of the first film, featuring a cold, emotionless Batou as the lead. Togusa knows he is upset at the disappearance of Major Kusanagi and is very meek in this film.

=== Ghost in the Shell: Stand Alone Complex ===
In Stand Alone Complex, several episodes involving an illegally used wiretap called an Interceptor refer to his background as a detective in the police force and his subsequent recruitment into Section 9. He is pretty much the only character other than Batou whose history is shown in the first season since the other members of Section 9 appear in certain episodes. Despite this background revelation, his first name has not yet been mentioned.

He is the least-augmented member of Section 9, although he can still fare well in melee combat against cyborgs. All he has is the implanted cyber-brain, just like Chief Aramaki. He is somewhat skeptical of the blurring of the lines between man and machine, but he also suffers the worst injuries due to being human. In the manga, he is injured and hospitalized after being caught near a bomb blast. In Stand Alone Complex, he's shot while doing an investigation and wonders aloud if he shouldn't be a full cyborg. When Aramaki is taken away for questioning, Togusa is arrested and detained for some time before being released; it is stated that Aramaki did this intentionally in order to keep Togusa out of immediate danger, due to his having a family and his earlier brush with death. He is later shown working at the security company that was his official cover while working for the government and is unaware of the fate of the other members for several months, effectively leaving him out of the loop because he was being monitored heavily; though such behavior from the rest of Section 9 is rather odd. Since they can hack into government records without being discovered, it is safe to presume that they would have no problem working around surveillance, and therefore should have been able to alert Togusa to the section's survival. Their failure to do so resulted in Togusa suffering a minor psychological break, attempting to assassinate one of the perpetrators in the Laughing Man case, which would have been detrimental to the protection given to him.

He expresses some disdain for the Tachikoma tanks, not to mention Batou's penchant for favoring one of the blue tanks. He dismissively refers to one of them as "just a machine", prompting outrage from the Tachikomas in the Section 9 hangar, with one calling him a bigot and another demanding a retraction of the statement. The contentious relationship continues in Second Gig, when Togusa and a Tachikoma go on a mission to abandoned Tokyo and the goofy little tank serves to mostly get under his skin (before saving it). But despite his dislike for the sentient machines, he is not above spending leisure time with them; he is seen playing Othello with one (although the Tachikoma thought they were playing 'Go' and attempts a critical stone capture, exclaiming "Checkmate", to which an exasperated Togusa replies "That's a completely different game!") near the end of an episode.

=== Ghost in the Shell: S.A.C. Solid State Society ===
In the Solid State Society feature film set in the S.A.C. universe, Major Kusanagi has left Section 9 and Togusa is now the head of field operations. Section 9 has grown considerably in this film, with a staff of more than 20. He has replaced his revolver for a Seburo M-10 pistol, although he carries his revolver on a back holster and his pistol on a shoulder holster. He has also undergone some form of cyberization (though what was cyberized was not mentioned), and he has informed his family of his work in Section 9. His cyberbrain was hacked while he was trying to get his daughter to safety. To stop his body from taking his daughter to the S.S.S., he was forced to attempt suicide with his revolver, but was stopped by the Major. He later on took part in the raid of the Solid State Society in their headquarters. He took out one exoskeleton and then acted as the bodyguard for Aramaki. It is shown that because he is now the field leader of Section 9, he is unable to spend time with his family as much as he used to, reflecting the common problem in Japan of disconnection between a salaryman and their families. Togusa has discussed undergoing full cyberization with his family, in order to enhance his abilities for Section 9.
