= Gaelle Adisson =

American singer-songwriter and producer (born 1974)

- Born: 1974 (age 51–52)
- Origin: South Orange, New Jersey
- Genres: Deep house; R&B; soul; dance; downtempo; electronic
- Occupations: Singer-songwriter; producer
- Years active: 1997–present
- Label: Naked Music

Gaelle Adisson (born 1974) is an American deep house and downtempo singer-songwriter and producer.

== Early life ==
Gaelle Adisson was born in 1974 in New Jersey.

== Career ==
Adisson contributed vocals on the 1999 global hit "King of My Castle", a song by the Wamdue Project. "King of My Castle" peaked at the top of the Billboard Dance Club Play chart in 1998. "King of My Castle" also topped the charts in the United Kingdom, and peaked within the top ten of the charts in several other countries, including Denmark, France, and Germany.

In 2004, Gaelle released her debut album, Transient through the label Naked Music. Her style is known for its smooth signature.

== Influences ==
Born to Haitian parents, Adisson has created a cultural hybrid that has influenced her music. The following artists have also influenced her: Patti LaBelle, Radiohead, Portishead, Cocteau Twins, Peter Gabriel, Sting, Sade, Björk, Duran Duran, Prince, Hugh Masekela, Julio Iglesias, Nina Simone, Trevor Horn, Trent Reznor and Donna Summer.

== Discography ==
=== Albums ===
- Transient (2004)

=== Singles ===
- "King of My Castle" (1997)
- "Cascades of Colour" (1999)
- "Mercy Street" (2002)
- "Give It Back" (2007)
