= Ghost in the Shell: The New Movie =

2015 film by Kazuchika Kise

- Theatrical release poster
- Directed by: Kazuchika Kise (Note: Chief director (総監督)); Kazuya Nomura
- Written by: Tow Ubukata
- Based on: Ghost in the Shell by Masamune Shirow
- Produced by: Kengo Abe; Natsuko Tatsuzawa; Tetsushi Suzuki
- Starring: Maaya Sakamoto; Ikkyuu Juku; Kenichirou Matsuda; Tarusuke Shingaki; Shunsuke Sakuya; Takurou Nakakuni; Yōji Ueda; Kazuya Nakai; Miyuki Sawashiro
- Music by: Cornelius
- Production company: Production I.G
- Distributed by: Toho
- Release date: June 20, 2015 (Japan)
- Running time: 100 minutes
- Country: Japan
- Language: Japanese
- Box office: $1.7 million

Ghost in the Shell: The New Movie (Japanese: 攻殻機動隊 新劇場版, Hepburn: Kōkaku Kidōtai Shin Gekijō-ban; lit. 'Mobile Armored Riot Police: The New Movie Edition'), also known in Japan as Ghost in the Shell: The Movie or New Ghost in the Shell, is a 2015 Japanese animated science fiction film directed by Kazuya Nomura. A continuation of the Ghost in the Shell: Arise original video animation, The New Movie is the first film in the series since Ghost in the Shell: Stand Alone Complex – Solid State Society in 2006, and the first theatrical film since Ghost in the Shell 2: Innocence in 2004. The film is a continuation of Pyrophoric Cult (the final episode of Arise), and ties up loose ends from that arc.

== Premise ==
Set after the events of Arise, the film involves the assassination of the Prime Minister of Japan which is publicly described as the "greatest event since the war". It is up to Public Security Section 9, led by Major Motoko Kusanagi, to discover the true nature of the murder. They are aided by the Prime Minister's son, Osamu Fujimoto.

== Voice cast ==
| Character | Japanese voice actor | English dubbing actor |
|---|---|---|
| Motoko Kusanagi | Maaya Sakamoto | Elizabeth Maxwell |
| Daisuke Aramaki | Ikkyuu Juku | John Swasey |
| Batou | Kenichirou Matsuda | Christopher Sabat |
| Togusa | Tarusuke Shingaki | Alex Organ |
| Ishikawa | Shunsuke Sakuya | Brandon Potter |
| Saito | Takuro Nakakuni | Marcus D. Stimac |
| Paz | Youji Ueda | Jason Douglas |
| Borma | Kazuya Nakai | Phil Parsons |
| Logicoma | Miyuki Sawashiro | Jad Saxton |
| Kurtz | Mayumi Asano | Mary Elizabeth McGlynn |
| Tsumugi | Kenji Nojima | Eric Vale |
| Robert Lee | Mugihito | Bradley Campbell |
| Chris | Megumi Han | Trina Nishimura |
| Richard Wong | Atsushi Miyauchi | Kenny Green |
| Osamu Fujimoto | NAOTO | David Matranga |

== Production ==
A new theatrical title in the Ghost in the Shell series was announced on September 5, 2014, on the official Japanese Ghost in the Shell: Arise website. The site confirmed the film would see a 2015 release, and labelled the upcoming film as the "further evolution [of the series]". On January 8, 2015, a short teaser trailer was revealed for the project unveiling a redesigned Major more closely resembling her appearance from the older films. The trailer listed Kazuya Nomura as the director, Kazuchika Kise as the character designer, Toru Okubo as the animation director, Tow Ubukata as the screenplay writer and Cornelius as the composer. The film was announced with a tentative release of "early summer of 2015" in Japanese theaters.

On March 20, the official website for The New Movie was updated with a teaser trailer showing thirty seconds of footage. The character designs of Section 9 were revealed to be more closely resembling the Arise series, rather than other incarnations of the characters. The trailer announced the film's Japanese premiere date of June 20, 2015. The film's main theme, "Mada Ugoku" by Maaya Sakamoto and Cornelius, was announced on March 25 alongside another track made for the movie titled "Anata o Tamotsu Mono". Both were released in a collectible compact disc on June 17, 2015. Sandaime J Soul Brothers' member, NAOTO, made his debut as a voice actor in The New Movie, starring in the role of a new character named Osamu Fujimoto. Fujimoto is described as the son of the fictional Japanese Prime Minister featured in the film.

A full trailer depicting scenes from the film was released on May 29, 2015, revealing many returning characters from Arise as well as mention of the Fire Starter hacker. A twelve-minute preview of footage from the film was released publicly on June 9 as promotion before its Japanese premiere. The film was released on June 20, 2015, in Japanese theaters. On July 25, it was announced by Funimation at the 2015 Otakon anime convention that the film would receive a localized theatrical run in Western territories under the title of Ghost in the Shell: The Movie, later changed to Ghost in the Shell: The New Movie.

== Promotion ==
=== Virtual Reality Diver ===
A promotional poster for Virtual Reality Diver, used at TGS 2015

On September 14, 2015, Production I.G. announced a 10-minute virtual reality short film titled Kōkaku Kidōtai - Shin Gekijōban: Virtual Reality Diver based on The New Movie. The short film is described as an "original story" presented in "360° 3D video" and plays through the use of the Oculus Rift virtual reality headset, releasing worldwide on both the Apple App Store and Google Play in the fourth quarter of 2015. A three-minute demonstration trailer of Virtual Reality Diver was shown at the 2015 Tokyo Game Show. It was input through a single 2D channel, rather than the 3D input planned for the final product, in order to present it to a larger press through the six-meter hemispherical display. In subsequent press releases, many outlets released tilted photographs of the trailer.

Virtual Reality Diver is part of Production I.G.'s "SIGN" project, an effort to create a "bodily sensation of being in another world" and to "combine futuristic technology with art". It is a collaborative effort with graphics design studio "WOW". Staff from Production I.G. includes Mikio Gunji as executive producer, Atsunori Maeshima as producer, and Hiroyuki Ogino as an assistant. Staff from WOW includes Nobumichi Asai as creative director, Toshiyuki Takahei as technical director, and Satoru Itoya as technical producer. The voice work in the film features Maaya Sakamoto as Major Kusanagi, Kenichirou Matsuda as Batou, Miyuki Sawashiro as the Logicoma, Ryota Takeuchi as original character Okitatsu Oribe and Sayaka Ohara as Yuri.

== Releases ==
Ghost in the Shell: The New Movie was released on Japanese home video (Blu-ray and DVD) on October 28, 2015, under the Bandai Visual label. Special features included on the home release are an audio commentary overdubbing the film, a second disc with footage from "Ghost in the Shell All Night" that features cast interviews with previous directors and producers in the franchise (including Mamoru Oshii, Kenji Kamiyama, Tow Ubukata among others), as well as commercials, trailers and a promotional video. The New Movie was given a limited release in American cinemas on the 10th, 11th, and 16 November 2015.

== Reception ==
Ghost in the Shell: The New Movie has received mostly positive reception. Richard Eisenbeis of Kotaku called the film a "solid addition to the franchise and a great capstone to the often shaky Arise story", praising the action scenes in particular as "excellent from start to finish". His criticisms of the film were on the reliance of homages to other Ghost in the Shell property, saying that "homages are fine; but like any trope in film, they lose their charm if you use them too often". He ended his review wishing to see further exploration into the Arise universe, albeit satisfied with Arise as a whole.

The film grossed $1,713,406 at the box office.
