= Ghost in the Shell: Arise =

Japanese anime film and television series

- Ghost in the Shell: Arise Borders 1 & 2 cover, which includes both Ghost Pain and Ghost Whispers

攻殻機動隊ARISE (Kōkaku Kidōtai ARISE)
- Genre: Cyberpunk
- Created by: Masamune Shirow
- Manga

Ghost in the Shell: Arise – Sleepless Eye
- Written by: Junichi Fujisaku
- Illustrated by: Takumi Ōyama
- Published by: Kodansha
- Magazine: Monthly Young Magazine
- Original run: March 13, 2013 – June 20, 2016
- Volumes: 7
- Original video animation
- Directed by: Kazuchika Kise; Masahiko Murata; Atsushi Takeuchi; Susumu Kudou
- Produced by: Kengo Abe; Natsuko Tatsuzawa; Tomoyasu Nishimura
- Written by: Tow Ubukata (1–4); Junichi Fujisaku (5)
- Music by: Cornelius
- Studio: Production I.G
- Licensed by: Crunchyroll
- Released: June 22, 2013 – August 26, 2015
- Runtime: 50 minutes each
- Episodes: 5
- Anime television series

Ghost in the Shell: Arise – Alternative Architecture
- Directed by: Kazuchika Kise (Note: Chief director (総監督) for all parts except Ghost Tears.); Susumu Kudou (1–2) (Note: Ghost Stands Alone); Masahiko Murata (3–4) (Note: Ghost Pain); Atsushi Takeuchi (5–6) (Note: Ghost Whispers)
- Produced by: Kengo Abe; Natsuko Tatsuzawa; Tomoyasu Nishimura (1–8) (Note: Ghost Stands Alone, Ghost Pain, Ghost Whispers, and Ghost Tears); Tetsushi Suzuki (9–10) (Note: Pyrophoric Cult)
- Written by: Tow Ubukata (1–8); Junichi Fujisaku (9–10)
- Music by: Cornelius
- Studio: Production I.G
- Licensed by: NA: Crunchyroll
- Original network: Tokyo MX, KBS, Sun TV, TV Aichi, HTB, OX, SBS, TVQ, BS11
- Original run: April 5, 2015 – June 14, 2015
- Episodes: 10
- Anime film

Ghost in the Shell: The New Movie
- Directed by: Kazuchika Kise (Note: Chief director (総監督)); Kazuya Nomura
- Produced by: Kengo Abe; Natsuko Tatsuzawa; Tetsushi Suzuki
- Written by: Tow Ubukata
- Music by: Cornelius
- Studio: Production I.G.
- Licensed by: NA: Crunchyroll
- Released: June 20, 2015
- Runtime: 100 minutes
- icon

Ghost in the Shell: Arise (Japanese: 攻殻機動隊 ARISE, Hepburn: Kōkaku Kidōtai Araizu) is an original video animation and television series that serves as a re-imagining of the 1989–90 manga series Ghost in the Shell by Masamune Shirow. The series features new character designs and is directed by Kazuchika Kise, screenplay by Tow Ubukata, and music by Cornelius.

Ghost in the Shell: Arise – Alternative Architecture, a recompilation of the four original parts of the OVA in a television format, aired on nine stations from April 5 to June 14, 2015. The AAA broadcast included two original episodes (later released as the fifth OVA) that help tie Ghost in the Shell: Arise with its 2015 animated film sequel Ghost in the Shell: The New Movie.

== Plot ==
The series takes place in the year 2027, where many people in developed countries have become cyborgs with prosthetic bodies. Primarily set in the fictional Japanese Newport City, the series follows a younger Motoko Kusanagi before the formation of Public Security Section 9. At the start of Arise she is a member of the federal 501 Organization, a group who employs advanced infiltration tactics and espionage to attack or neutralize enemy threats. The 501 Organization is also the legal owner of Kusanagi's prosthetic body, which is lent to her in exchange for her services to the group –an abiding source of tension.

== Production ==
Masamune Shirow, author of the original Ghost in the Shell manga, provided a plot as the basic idea for this alternate-universe origin-story but asked the staff to do what they wanted with it, remaining largely hands-off. This resulted in less narrative involvement by him compared to season 1 of Ghost in the Shell: Stand Alone Complex, although his supplied character and mechanical designs were followed more closely here. These contributions are shown in his editorial section in Pandora in the Crimson Shell, beginning with Vol. 3. Both unrelated projects ended up having unintentional crossover names, ideas, and designs, as Shirow was creating material for the launches of both at the same time, with Lieutenant Colonel Kurtz shifting from one project to the other. Unit 501 subsequently became part of Motoko Kusanagi's military history in Shirow's own canon, after appearing in the extra chapter of Vol. 23, having previously been hinted at in the editorials.

== Cast and characters ==
Arise features an original Japanese voice cast, with only one actor reprising their role from the Oshii film and Stand Alone Complex anime television series. Maaya Sakamoto replaces Atsuko Tanaka as the voice of Major Motoko Kusanagi, Sakamoto having previously voiced the Major as a child in both the film, and Stand Alone Complex series. Other changes to the cast include Kenichirou Matsuda as Batou, Tarusuke Shingaki as Togusa, Ikyuu Jyuku as Chief Daisuke Aramaki, Tomoyuki Dan as Ishikawa, Takuro Nakakuni as Saito, Yōji Ueda as Paz, and Kazuya Nakai as Borma. Miyuki Sawashiro provides the voice of the series' think tanks now called the Logicoma (ロジコマ, Rojikoma), short for Logistics Conveyer Machine (ロジスティックス・コンベイヤー・マシン, Rojisutikkusu Konbeiyā Mashin). The Logicoma also feature in anime shorts included on the Blu-ray releases titled Logicoma Beat (ロジコマ・ビート, Rojikoma Bīto).

New characters in the first episode include Kurtz (クルツ, Kurutsu), voiced by Mayumi Asano in Japanese and by Mary Elizabeth McGlynn (the previous voice of the Major) in English, the head of the Army 501 Organization (陸軍501機関, Rikugun Go Maru Ichi Kikan), the firm who converted Motoko Kusanagi into a full cyborg and who Kusanagi would replace in the organization had she not joined Section 9; Raizo (ライゾー, Raizō), voiced by Takanori Hoshino, a combat cyborg for the 501 Organization that uses electricity as weapons; Ibachi (イバチ), voiced by Yasuhiro Mamiya, a combat cyborg for the 501 Organization skilled in bōjutsu and armed with hidden machine guns; Tsumugi (ツムギ), voiced by Kenji Nojima, a tactical cyborg for the 501 Organization that has a set of twins' cyberbrains in its head who always talk to each other; and Lieutenant Colonel Mamuro (マムロ), voiced by Atsushi Miyauchi, the leader of the 501 Organization who raised Kusanagi but has disappeared, having had something to do with arms dealing.

Character	Japanese	English
Motoko Kusanagi	Maaya Sakamoto	Elizabeth Maxwell
Daisuke Aramaki	Ikyuu Jyuku	John Swasey
Batou	Kenichirou Matsuda	Christopher Sabat
Paz	Yoji Ueda	Jason Douglas
Togusa	Tarusuke Shingaki	Alex Organ
Saito	Takuro Nakakuni	Marcus Stimac
Kurutsu	Mayumi Asano	Mary Elizabeth McGlynn
Mamuro	Atsushi Miyauchi	Brian Mathis
Ibachi	Yasuhiro Mamiya	Chris Rager
Tsumugi	Kenji Nojima	Eric Vale
Raizo	Takanori Hoshino	David Wald
Logicoma	Miyuki Sawashiro	Jad Saxton

== Related media ==
=== OVAs ===
Each of the original video animations are known as "Borders" and have received national theatrical releases one month before the release of their Blu-ray and DVD versions. A recurring part of the films is the mysterious Fire Starter computer virus, as well as looking into the lives of Public Security Section 9's members before its formation.

The opening theme for the first four episodes is called "GHOST IN THE SHELL ARISE" and is performed by both Salyu and Cornelius, it is also used as an ending for the fifth episode, the opening of which is "Anata o Tamotsu Mono" by Maaya Sakamoto (who also plays the role of Major Kusanagi) and Cornelius; the ending themes are different for each episode.

== Episodes ==
No.	Title	Original release date	English release date
1	"Ghost Pain"	June 22, 2013	October 21, 2014
A bomb has gone off in Newport City, killing a major arms dealer who may have ties with the mysterious 501 Organization. Public Security official Daisuke Aramaki, hires Motoko Kusanagi to investigate, but on the case with her are "Sleepless Eye" Batou, who believes Kusanagi is a criminal, Detective Togusa of the Niihama Police who is investigating a series of prostitute murders he believes are related to the incident, and Lieutenant Colonel Kurtz of the 501 Organization who also wishes to keep an eye on Kusanagi. Kusanagi is subjected to memory loss that inhibits her progress in the case, and it is later revealed that she was implanted with false memories, a product of a failed "Ghost Hack" she had performed on the money-laundering conspirator Mamuro, who was infected with a memory virus. Once she realizes that the 501 Organization was involved with the scandal, she leaves the unit, now in legal possession of her own prosthetic body. She is met by Aramaki, who proposes the formation of a new unit within Public Security. The ending song is "Jibun ga Inai" (じぶんがいない, "There Is No me") composed and arranged by Cornelius, lyrics by Yura Yura Teikoku's vocalist and guitarist Shintaro Sakamoto and performed by salyu × salyu.
2	"Ghost Whispers"	November 30, 2013	October 21, 2014
A former soldier from the Qhardistani War named Kazuya Soga is being tried for "crimes against humanity" by the Japanese government. To prove his innocence, Soga sends his men to retrieve evidence hidden somewhere in a web of information called "Pandora's Box". This team is led by the former Ranger Batou, who also employs intel officer Ishikawa and Borma as well as the rest of Soga's men. Major Kusanagi is sent to investigate the matter and results in an all-out war between Public Security and Soga's group. Along the way, she is allied with Paz as well a female American Special Forces member named "VV". Saito is also involved, but changes sides depending on who offers more money. After the Kusanagi invades Soga's cyberspace, she discovers that he was affected by a memory-falsification virus that covered up the truth of what happened in the war, in which he indeed killed the refugees who were in fact guerrillas. When he learns the truth, he decides to kill himself, but the virus he tried to upload to Pandora's Box is still being carried through by none other than VV. With the help of Batou, VV is killed before she can complete the transfer and is revealed to be an android when the battle ends. Kusanagi promises Batou that he may be taken out of incarceration, but only if he decides to join her team. The ending song is "Soto wa Senjō da yo" (外は戦場だよ, "Outside It's a Battlefield!") composed and arranged by Cornelius, lyrics by Sakamoto, and performed by Ichiko Aoba with Cornelius.
3	"Ghost Tears"	June 28, 2014	October 13, 2015
Togusa investigates the death of Detective Naoharu Mizuki, killed by an explosion at a dam while holding a suitcase containing prosthetic legs from the Mermaid's Leg corporation. Togusa questions Dr. Zhinzhee Bekka Arr Thied, head of a Kuzan water company owning the dam, and also a Qhardi, but is told to back off. Meanwhile, Major Kusanagi's team of Batou, Ishikawa, Borma, Paz and Saito is called out to stop a Qhardi separatist organization. When they catch them, Kusanagi is intrigued by their contaminated ghosts. Aramaki says they are dealing with a false memory virus that can infiltrate, hack, and brainwash simultaneously created by a programmer known as "Fire Starter", leader of the Qaurdi separatists in Kuzan. The captured separatists all have Scylla (スクラサス, Sukurasasu) tattoos. Meanwhile, Kusanagi gets closer to her prosthetics specialist boyfriend Akira Hose, but Togusa confronts Kusanagi about him, suggesting a link between Akira, the dam explosion, prosthetics-related crimes and his involvement with her. Kusanagi eventually realizes that Akira is the key, but also a puppet in a complex web involving Japanese weapons manufacturer Harimadara Heavy Industries, weapons smuggling, explosive prosthetics and propagation of the false memory virus. When she finally confronts Akira, he takes his own life, terminating himself as a virus host. Batou later tells Kusanagi that he figured she was the original Scylla and leader of the separatist army, but she replies that she's stopped switching bodies so often since then. Later Kusanagi asks Togusa to join her team, even if he is just a natural, married, and a father. The ending song is "Heart Grenade" composed and arranged by Cornelius, lyrics and performed by Sean Lennon.
4	"Ghost Stands Alone"	September 6, 2014	October 13, 2015
In the winter of 2028, tensions are rising in New Port City as demonstrations are held concerning the interests of foreign cartels. Aramaki of Section 9 shuts down the city following a tip-off about a Qhardi group being mobilized to target the Yotsubashi Building area following the cyber-contamination at Harimadara months ago. Suddenly the Riot Squad open fire on the citizens and even themselves. Kusanagi and her team suspect a self-destructing Stuxnet-type virus is the cause, possibly released by the terrorist "Fire Starter." Meanwhile at a VIP ceremony to celebrate a contract between the Kuzan water company and Harimada, a hacked Kusanagi using optical camouflages kills Dr. Zhinzhee Bekka Arr Thied and escapes. In the streets, Batou captures a cyborg girl, Emma Tsuda, who started the massacre. Colonel Hozumi of Army intelligence wants her for testing for the cyber-virus – a triple package of brainwashing, Ghost infiltration, and false memory creation – but Aramaki refuses. On examination, Tsuda is found to be technical officer in Colonel Hozumi's command with a special neurochip-type cyberbrain which was hacked by Brinda Jr., "Scarecrow". Ishikawa's research shows that Colonel Hozumi is targeting Harimadara, the Vice-Minister and the 501. On the docks, Hozumi shoots Tsuda to silence her, but her and Scarecrow's Ghosts merge with a Harimadara "multi-legged tank". When Kusanagi's team eventually stops it with the help of the Logicomas, the tank bursts open and a cyborg emerges and walks toward the sea. However, is destroyed by cannon fire from a Kuzan ship offshore as is Hozumi's helicopter overhead. With Hozumi in custody, Aramaki tells Kusanagi that she has now been granted special authority by the Minister of Home Affairs to Investigate the high-level hacking virus and any organizations involved. The ending song is "Split Spirit" by Yukihiro Takahashi and METAFIVE.
5	"Pyrophoric Cult"	August 26, 2015	–
Before being captured, Hozumi claims that she had successfully packaged the Fire-Starter virus with cyberbrains and could create all the soldiers she wanted. meanwhile an unknown figure uses a translucent sphere to blow up a passenger flight 381 as it flies overhead by exploding an Ariel prosthesis implanted in Tei Musrsaka, an undercover US agent infected with the Fire-Starter virus. When Kusanagi's team go to investigate his apartment because of a link to Fire-Starter, they find US agents are already there. In Aramaki's office Kusanagi meets Jeril, from American Army intelligence who is also hunting the Fire-Starter broker they have code-named Pyromaniac. Kusanagi's team agrees to Aramaki's request to work with them on the condition she can question Hozumi who is also a target of Pyromaniac. Ishikawa finds that Musrsaka was following Galves Garcia, a cyber-drug dealer. As Kusanagi is about to transfer Hozumi from the Army Medical Center to the courthouse, Pyromaniac strikes causing chaos and confusion. Kusanagi traces him to the same building, where they capture a man apparently being used as a proxy. The prisoner escapes, revealing himself to be the Pyromaniac, and acquiring security codes. Kusanagi deduces that Pyromaniac had inside assistance, confirmed when he attacks the convoy transporting Hozumi from a helicopter gunship. Pyromaniac hacks into Kusanagi from outside and they meet in a virtual world that looks like a Kuzan battlefield. He states that he is a vessel for the Ghosts of Galvez, and Emma, and Murasaka. Kusanagi argues that he's just a construct of false memories of the Fire-Starter virus to eliminate threats to its continued existence and she traps then erases him. In the real world, Pyromaniac also dies, and Kurutsu, head of the 501 Organization, retrieves the translucent sphere from him and dumps his body. Meanwhile, Kusanagi's team and the Tachikoma fight off forces controlled by the Fire-Starter virus. In the aftermath, little useful is retrieved from Pyromaniac's cyberbrain and Kusanagi is congratulated by the prime Minister for catching the terrorist who downed flight 381. Elsewhere, Kurutsu quietly states that she has finished refining the virus. The ending song is "GHOST IN THE SHELL ARISE" by Cornelius.

=== Manga ===
A manga original story titled Ghost in the Shell: Arise ~Sleepless Eye~ (攻殻機動隊ARISE～眠らない眼の男 Sleepless Eye～, Kōkaku Kidōtai ARISE ~Nemuranai Me no Otoko Sleepless Eye~; literally "The Man With Eyes That Do Not Sleep") began serialization in Kodansha's Monthly Young Magazine's April 2013 issue, released March 13, 2013, and ended serialization on June 20, 2016. Compiled into seven volumes and split into six "Anecdotes". The first is an original prologue telling the story of Kusanagi and Batou's first meeting during the Qhardistani War. Adaptations of Borders 1–4 follow, all told from Batou's perspective and featuring exclusive material, with Fujisaku writing an original epilogue that returns to Qhardistani instead of adapting his own Border 5 script for the manga. Released in English on K Manga.

=== Anime ===
Ghost in the Shell: Arise – Alternative Architecture is a television broadcasting of the previously released original video animations alongside new content. It began airing in Japan on April 5, 2015, broadcasting from the Tokyo MX, KBS, Sun TV, TV Aichi, HTB, OX, SBS, TVQ and BS11 networks. Funimation's subtitled localization of the series began on April 8, 2015, with the Arise – Alternative Architecture releases being released under the same Ghost in the Shell: Arise listing for the original pentalogy, but labelled as television episodes to differentiate the two.

The opening theme is "Anata o tamotsu mono" by Maaya Sakamoto (who also plays the role of Major Kusanagi) and Cornelius.

=== Stage play ===
A stage production titled Ghost in the Shell: Arise – Ghost is Alive was staged between the November 5 to 15, 2015 at the Tokyo Playhouse (Ikebukuro). Directed by Shutaro Oku and starring Kaede Aono as Motoko Kusanagi, Ren Yagami as Batou, Kentarou Kanesaki as Togusa and Ikkyuu Juku (塾 一久) reprising his role from the anime as Daisuke Aramaki. The play was presented with 3-D glasses and featured 3-D projected backdrops as well as a dance number at the end.

=== Video game ===
A virtual reality game entitled Ghost in the Shell Arise: Stealth Hounds, was made available at Bandai Namco's arcade VR Zone Shinjuku in 2017.

== Promotion ==
On September 19, 2013, Pacific Racing Team and Production I.G. collaborated on an Arise themed Porsche 911 GT3R model race car labelled the NAC Ghost in the Shell ARISE DR Porsche, which was used for the official Super GT auto race. It was discontinued in March 2014 and replaced with a Love Live! theme. From November 1 until December 31, 2013, a "Ghost in the Shell: Arise Airport AR Event" was held in many Japanese airports, with AR posters scattered around Haneda Airport, Ibaraki Airport and Fukuoka Airport for visitors to scan using an official app. A free admission special event titled "Ghost in the Shell LABO ~ Shinjuku Gitai" was held in Eastern Shinjuku on November 29 to 30, 2013, where attendees received special promotional material designed after the prosthetic wiring in the series created by renowned makeup artist JIRO.

== Releases ==
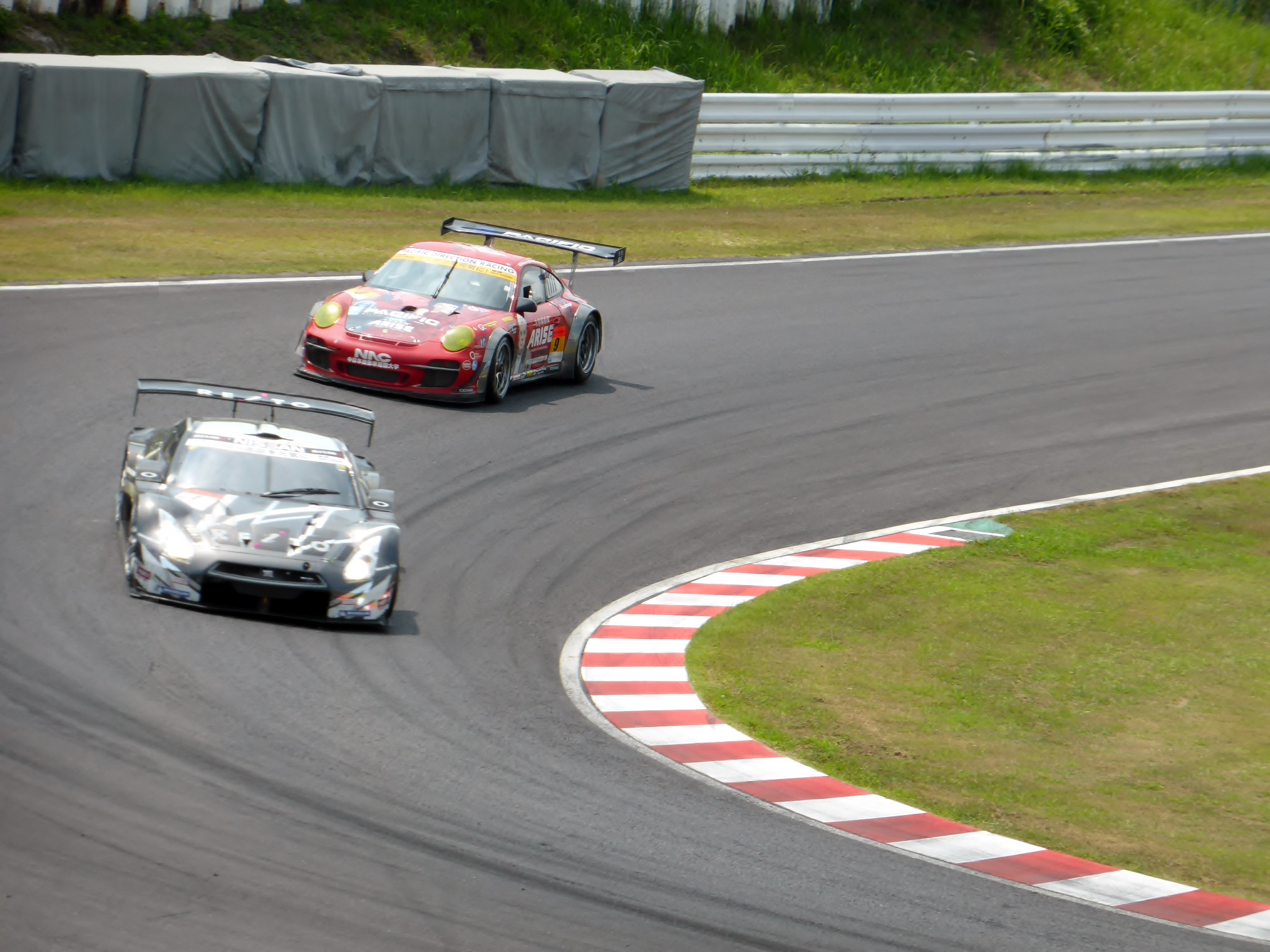
A Porsche 911 GT3 branded with Ghost in the Shell: Arise imagery

On June 14, 2013, Funimation announced that it had acquired the rights for the series for a North American release. Funimation released parts 1 and 2 on Blu-ray and DVD to North America on October 28, 2014. On January 8, 2015, it was announced that Arise would be adapted into a "TV series" in the spring of 2015. This was later confirmed to be a recompilation of the first four films into a television format, with two original episodes, collectively titled Ghost in the Shell: Arise – Alternative Architecture (Ghost in the Shell AAA).

An original episode titled "Pyrophoric Cult", was given a standalone home video release in Japan on August 26, 2015, with runtime of 50 minutes. This was reduced and split in two for the previous AAA broadcasting. The plot involves the "Fire Starter" virus explored in Arise previously and introduces the new character Pyromaniac. The episode ties into the film Ghost in the Shell: The New Movie. "Pyrophoric Cult" did not receive an English dub by Funimation. In September 2026, a new English dub of Arise, The New Movie and Pyrophoric Cult were released on Amazon Prime Video.

== Reception ==
Overall reception of Ghost in the Shell: Arise has been largely positive. Initial reactions upon announcement of the series were mainly centered on the visual redesign of the cast, particularly Major Kusanagi. Upon release of the first episode, Richard Eisenbeis of Kotaku has called Arise "a worthy addition to Ghost in the Shell" and assured viewers that "the changes to the series are only skin-deep". However, he stated that the episode's themes are "things you have at least somewhat seen explored before in the other iterations of the franchise". Hugo Ozman of Twitch Film has stated similar opinions, calling Ghost Pain "interesting, but not spectacular".
