= Batou =

Fictional character from Ghost in the Shell

- Ghost in the Shell character
- Batou of Section 9, as portrayed in the Stand Alone Complex anime series
- First appearance: Ghost in the Shell #02 "Super Spartan" (1989)
- Created by: Masamune Shirow
- Voiced by: Japanese Akio Ōtsuka (most media) Shinji Ogawa (1997 video game) Kenichirou Matsuda (Arise, The New Movie) Hiroki Yasumoto (The Ghost in the Shell TV series) English Richard Epcar (most media) Russell Wait (S.A.C. [Animax dub]) David Kaye (S.A.C. OVAs) Christopher Sabat (Arise, The New Movie) Bill Butts (The Ghost in the Shell TV series)
- Portrayed by: Ren Yagami (stage play); Pilou Asbæk (2017 film)

In-universe information
- Aliases: Bateau; Buttetsu (undercover)
- Nickname: The Ranger
- Title: Sergeant
- Affiliations: Public Security Section 9 Japanese Ground Self Defense Force (formerly)

Batou (Japanese: バトー, Hepburn: Batō) is a main male character in Masamune Shirow's Ghost in the Shell series. He is the second-best melee fighter in Section 9, and is the second in command under Major Motoko Kusanagi. He is a battle-hardened cyborg special operative with a long distinguished military career and a no-nonsense attitude. Though he looks imposing, he is known for his warm heart, sense of humor, and love for animals.

== Conception and creation ==
Batou serves as pointman whose combat specialty is "near combat." Batou often acts as the Section 9 team's comic relief.

=== Background ===
Batou's limbs are all prosthetic; despite the fact that exercise provides negligible benefit, Batou enjoys jogging and weightlifting as a hobby. Shirow's characterization of Batou in the manga, and indeed the other members of Section 9, is notably more light-hearted than the characterization used in Mamoru Oshii's films of the same name. His eyes, though prosthetic, often bulge comically when he is alarmed. He frequently jokes with Motoko, Togusa, the Tachikomas, and practically everyone else who crosses his path. His serious side becomes much more pronounced in a chapter of the manga where Yano, a trainee of Batou's, is murdered by a cybercriminal named Koil Krasnov. Batou loses his temper and impulsively calls up Section 9 Chief Aramaki, demanding an explanation for Yano's death, then storms off announcing (in the English translation), "That… Koil is dead meat!"

Batou had seemingly hated anyone who tried to make Section 9 fix the mess of another organization, such as the AI hijacking of the Jigabachi choppers in the SAC series. However, in the Ghost in the Shell movie he appears more stoic and silent than his TV and manga counterpart. Particularly in Ghost in the Shell 2: Innocence, Batou also appears moderately distant and possibly bitter. In addition, he jokes around with a hint of irony being mentioned.

=== Design ===
Stand Alone Complex character designer Hajime Shimomura said that Batou's image was based on the Minotaur.

While his name is officially romanized as "Batou", in some copies of the first film's subtitles and credits, it is spelled "Bateau" (the French word for "boat").

The name "Batou" means "horse" in Japanese and may refer to Japanese Buddhism's Batou Kannon (Horse-Headed Kannon) with his small robotic implant eyes and long face as visual references. It also means "eight-headed" in Mandarin Chinese, which is significant since "Kusanagi" was the name of a sword that was taken from Orochi, an eight-headed and eight-tailed mountain dragon in Japanese mythology.

=== Relationships ===
Of all Section 9 characters, Batou is closest with the Major professionally and in civilian life. Even on missions, he is known to disregard her rank or authority to "speak freely" without permission. There is an arguable tension of romantic undertones between the two of them at times.

== Appearances in media ==
=== In literature ===
Batou originally appeared in the manga authored by Masamune Shirow, serialized in Kodansha's "Young Magazine Pirate Edition" from 1989 to 1991. Unlike S.A.C., where in a similar situation Batou spares the life of an ex-C.I.A. operative, Batou makes good on his threat and personally terminates Koil. His appearance and style of dress vary considerably over the series' run.

In Ghost in the Shell 2: Man/Machine Interface, Batou's head is shaved, and he is dressed in a simple black outfit, though his sense of humor remains intact. During a psychic monitoring of the virtual contact between the main character of the manga and another entity on the net, the psychic states, "Something of substance, something fruitful has passed between them," to which Batou remarks, "A persimmon maybe?" This prompts Chief Aramaki to issue an ultimatum: "If you can't be serious you can leave the room." He also asks to link with the psychic when she suffers a similar experience to Motoko's contact with the Puppet Master, but his request is denied.

=== In films ===
==== Animated film ====
The portrayal of Batou in Mamoru Oshii's films is very different from the depiction in the anime series. Ghost in the Shell and Innocence depict a Batou who is much more subdued, even to the point of brusqueness. His appearance consists of a white crew-cut (similar to the manga) in the first film, while in the second film he has a short ponytail. Batou is voiced by Akio Ōtsuka in Japanese and Richard Epcar in English in all Ghost in the Shell media with the exception of The Laughing Man and Individual Eleven OVAs where he is voiced by David Kaye in English, and Arise, where he is voiced by Kenichirou Matsuda and Christopher Sabat respectively.

Batou is the central character of Innocence, which centers around his personal life after the disappearance of Major Motoko Kusanagi at the end of the first film. Oshii has commented that the investigation is really secondary to the plot. What is most notable about Batou's emotion in Innocence is his lack thereof; for the most part he expresses nothing whatsoever. The commentary on the Innocence DVD touches on the fact that it is Batou's lone companion, a Basset Hound named Gabriel, that express almost all of the emotion in the entire film. When Batou is required to leave in order to continue his investigation, Gabriel is left in the care of Togusa and his family. Ishikawa, Batou's senior, chides him for keeping such a high-maintenance dog since he is a single man in a dangerous line of work. The film strongly suggests that Batou harbors romantic feelings for the Major; however, no definitive statement of his feelings is ever made.

After shooting his own right arm as a result of brain-hacking, Batou is fitted with a new DNA-matched prosthetic arm with a shotgun hidden inside. He is depicted as being tougher than in the other Ghost in the Shell incarnations, when he is seen to shoot two live grenades and survive the blast, and withstand a substantial leap down the shaft of the Locus Solus factory ship. In both films, Batou carries a gun dubbed a "Jericho 942," based on the real Jericho 941 made by IMI but chambered for .50AE. In Innocence, he is also seen with a compact S&W pistol and a small semiautomatic shotgun. The Innocence prequel novel, "After the Long Goodbye," notes that Batou's S&W pistol is chambered for the .40 S&W cartridge.

==== Live action film ====
Pilou Asbæk portrays Batou in the 2017 live action film. "The manga is very philosophical, very weird, very spiritual," said Asbæk. "So I knew that my job with Batou was to bring in a little bit of heart and soul into this futuristic sci-fi world." Asbæk had a hard time understanding his character until he looked back at the Ghost in the Shell source material. "I didn't have any idea what to do with the character and then I looked at the manga again, and I saw two things. I saw he likes beer, and he likes pizza. And if you know me for five minutes, that's 80 percent of my personality!" he said. The novelization of the film describes Batou as a Scandinavian. Batou starts out with normal eyes, but later suffers blindness from an explosion; he replaces them with inhuman-looking prosthetics. In his free time, Batou feeds stray dogs.

=== In television ===
==== Stand Alone Complex series ====
In Ghost in the Shell: Stand Alone Complex, Batou's personality closely resembles his manga counterpart. He is depicted as an outgoing jokester, but with a quick temper. Unlike the Major, Batou often expresses his anger at injustice and cruelty quite openly. He is sometimes shown to be impatient with Section 9's rookies, such as Togusa. At times, Batou acts as a voice of reason and displays great concern for the Major, and she in turn admits that she can confide in him. Like Oshii's films, the series suggests romantic tension between the Major and Batou. The film Solid State Society more openly addresses this tension, when Batou admits that he'd been covering up the Major's involvement in any cases prior to the Puppeteer case. The movie closes with Batou putting his arm around the Major, although whether or not this is foretelling of any relationship between the two is left ambiguous.

Batou had served in a military special forces unit and often states that he was a Ranger-trained soldier with the Japanese Ground Self Defense Force (JGSDF) before entering Section 9. Despite the fact that his prosthetic body has little to gain from exercise, Batou often lifts weights and jogs. He is shown to have an affinity for martial arts and is widely regarded as nearly the best hand-to-hand combatant in Section 9, second only to the Major. He once idolized a famous boxer, Zaitsev, with whom he later spars while on an undercover mission.

Batou is the favorite superior of the Tachikomas because he regularly showers them with care and affection; in episode 2.15, it also is apparent that he shares a physical resemblance with their chief programmer. He has even dubbed one unit as his "personal" Tachikoma, refusing to operate any other and treating it with organic oil, both habits which culminate in problems. Later in the series, the Tachikomas' AI starts to develop rapidly, which is attributed to a mutation in a protein chip caused by Batou's oil. Also, since Batou treats them as individuals as opposed to interchangeable units, they begin to view themselves as such, which contributes to the development of their AI.

Batou is often seen driving a yellow Lancia Stratos coupe, a rare Italian car from the 1970s. He is shown to be very protective of the car and is hesitant to allow others to drive it. Togusa refers to Batou's love of the car as a comeback after Batou chides him for using a revolver instead of a more modern weapon. In Solid State Society, Batou drives a yellow Ford GT with black racing stripes. When the Major notices the new vehicle, she comments to Batou that "his tastes had changed."

== See also ==
- RanXerox
