= Ghost in the Shell (1995 film) =

1995 film by Mamoru Oshii

- Theatrical release poster

Japanese name
- Kanji: GHOST IN THE SHELL/攻殻機動隊
- Literal meaning: GHOST IN THE SHELL/Armored Shell Mobile Unit
Transcriptions
- Revised Hepburn: Gōsuto in za Sheru/Kōkaku Kidōtai
- Directed by: Mamoru Oshii
- Screenplay by: Kazunori Itō
- Based on: Ghost in the Shell by Masamune Shirow
- Produced by: Yoshimasa Mizuo; Ken Matsumoto; Ken Iyadomi; Mitsuhisa Ishikawa
- Starring: Atsuko Tanaka; Akio Otsuka; Iemasa Kayumi
- Cinematography: Hisao Shirai
- Edited by: Shūichi Kakesu; Shigeyuki Yamamori
- Music by: Kenji Kawai
- Production companies: Palm Pictures; Production I.G; Bandai Visual; Manga Entertainment
- Distributed by: Shochiku (Japan); Metrodome Distribution; Manga Entertainment (United Kingdom)
- Release dates: 18 November 1995 (Japan); 8 December 1995 (United Kingdom); 29 March 1996 (United States)
- Running time: 82 minutes
- Countries: Japan; United Kingdom
- Language: Japanese
- Budget: ¥330 million ($3 million)
- Box office: $10 million

Ghost in the Shell (Note: Ghost in the Shell/Kōkaku Kidōtai (Japanese: Ghost in the Shell/攻殻機動隊, Hepburn: Gōsuto in za Sheru/Kōkaku Kidōtai; lit."Ghost in the Shell/Mobile Armored Riot Police")) is a 1995 Japanese animated tech noir action thriller film directed by Mamoru Oshii from a screenplay by Kazunori Itō, based on the 1989 manga by Masamune Shirow. It stars the voices of Atsuko Tanaka, Akio Ōtsuka, and Iemasa Kayumi. It is a Japanese-British international co-production between Kodansha, Bandai Visual and Manga Entertainment, with animation provided by Production I.G.

Set in 2029 in the fictional New Port City, the film follows Major Motoko Kusanagi, a cyborg public-security agent who hunts an enigmatic hacker/ghost known as "the Puppet Master". The narrative incorporates philosophical themes that focus on self and identity in a technologically advanced world. The music, composed by Kenji Kawai, includes vocals in classical Japanese. The film's visuals were created through a combination of traditional cel animation and CGI animation.

Upon release, Ghost in the Shell received universal acclaim, with critics praising its narrative, visuals, and musical score. The film was initially considered a box-office failure before developing a cult following on home video. Since then, it has grown in esteem and is now considered to be one of the greatest anime and science fiction films of all time. It has inspired filmmakers such as The Wachowskis, creators of The Matrix franchise, and James Cameron, who described it as "the first truly adult animation film to reach a level of literary and visual excellence." At the 24th Annie Awards (1996), the film received numerous accolades, and was nominated in five categories—including Best Animated Feature—giving it the most nominations for a Japanese animated film at the Annie Awards until both The Boy and the Heron and Suzume took over the position (with seven each) at the 51st Annie Awards (2024).

A remastered version of the film, Ghost in the Shell 2.0, was released in 2008, featuring newly added digital effects, additional 3D animation, and new audio. Oshii also directed Ghost in the Shell 2: Innocence, released in 2004, which was billed as a standalone sequel. A live-action reinterpretation of the original film was released in 2017, directed by Rupert Sanders and starring Scarlett Johansson as Major Kusanagi.

== Plot ==
In 2029, with the advancement of cybernetic technology, the human body can be augmented or even completely replaced with cybernetic parts. Another significant achievement is the cyberbrain, a mechanical casing for the human brain that allows access to the Internet and other networks. An often-mentioned term is "ghost", referring to the consciousness inhabiting the body (the "shell").

Major Motoko Kusanagi is an assault-team leader for Public Security Section 9 of the futuristic New Port City in Japan. Following a request from Nakamura, chief of Section 6, she successfully assassinates a diplomat of a foreign country to prevent a programmer named Daita from defecting.

The Foreign Minister's interpreter is ghost-hacked, presumably to assassinate VIPs in an upcoming meeting. Believing the perpetrator to be the mysterious Puppet Master, Kusanagi's team follows the traced telephone calls that sent the virus. After a chase, they capture a garbage man and a thug. However, both are only ghost-hacked individuals with no knowledge of the Puppet Master, so the investigation again comes to a dead end.

Megatech Body, a shell manufacturer with suspected close ties to the government, is hacked and assembles a shell. The shell escapes the factory onto the highway and gets run over by a truck. As Section 9 examines the shell, they find a human ghost inside it. Unexpectedly, Section 6's department chief Nakamura arrives to reclaim the shell with a permit from the foreign minister. He claims that the ghost inside is the Puppet Master himself, lured into the shell by Section 6. The shell reactivates itself, claims to be a sentient being, and requests political asylum. After the Puppet Master initiates a brief argument about what constitutes a human, a camouflaged agent accompanying Nakamura starts a diversion and steals the shell.

Having suspected foul play, Kusanagi's team is prepared and immediately pursues the agent. Meanwhile, Section 9 researches "Project 2501", which was mentioned earlier by the Puppet Master, and finds a connection with Daita, whom Section 6 tries to keep from defecting the country. Facing the discovered information, Daisuke Aramaki, chief of Section 9, concludes that Section 6 created the Puppet Master for various political purposes, and now seeks to reclaim the body that it currently inhabits.

Kusanagi follows the car carrying the shell to an abandoned building, where it is guarded by a heavily armed and armored robotic tank. Anxious to face the Puppet Master's ghost, Kusanagi engages the tank without backup, resulting in her shell being mostly dismembered. Her partner Batou arrives in time to save her and helps connect her brain to the Puppet Master's.

The Puppet Master explains to Kusanagi that he was created by Section 6. While wandering various networks, he became sentient and began to contemplate his existence. Deciding that the essence of life is reproduction and mortality, he wants to exist within a physical brain that will eventually die. As he could not escape Section 6's network, he had to download himself into a cybernetic body. Having interacted with Kusanagi (without her knowledge), he believes she is also questioning her humanity and that they have much in common. He proposes merging their ghosts; in return, Kusanagi would gain all of his capabilities. Kusanagi agrees to the merge.

Snipers from Section 6 approach the building, intending to destroy the Puppet Master's and Kusanagi's brains to cover up Project 2501. The Puppet Master's shell is destroyed, but Batou shields Kusanagi's head in time to save her brain. As Section 9 closes in, the snipers retreat.

Kusanagi wakes up in Batou's safe house in a child-sized shell. She tells Batou that the entity within her is neither the Major nor the Puppet Master, but a combination of both. She promises Batou they will meet again, leaves the house, and contemplates where to go next while looking out over the city.

== Voice cast ==
Character	Japanese voice actor	English dubbing actor (Pseudonyms in parentheses)
Motoko Kusanagi	Atsuko Tanaka; Maaya Sakamoto (young)	Mimi Woods; Mona Marshall (Gina Connell) (young)
Batou	Akio Otsuka	Richard Epcar (Richard George)
The Puppet Master	Iemasa Kayumi (original); Yoshiko Sakakibara (2.0)	Tom Wyner (Abe Lasser)
Togusa	Koichi Yamadera	David Richard Thompson (Christopher Joyce)
Chief Aramaki	Tamio Ōki	William Frederick Knight (William Frederick)
Ishikawa	Yutaka Nakano	Michael Sorich
Chief Nakamura	Tesshō Genda	Simon Prescott (Ben Isaacson)
Mizuho Daita	Mitsuru Miyamoto	Richard Cansino (Steve Davis)
Garbage Collector A	Kazuhiro Yamaji	Kevin Seymour (Tom Carlton)
Garbage Collector B	Shigeru Chiba	Doug Stone

== Production ==
=== Development ===
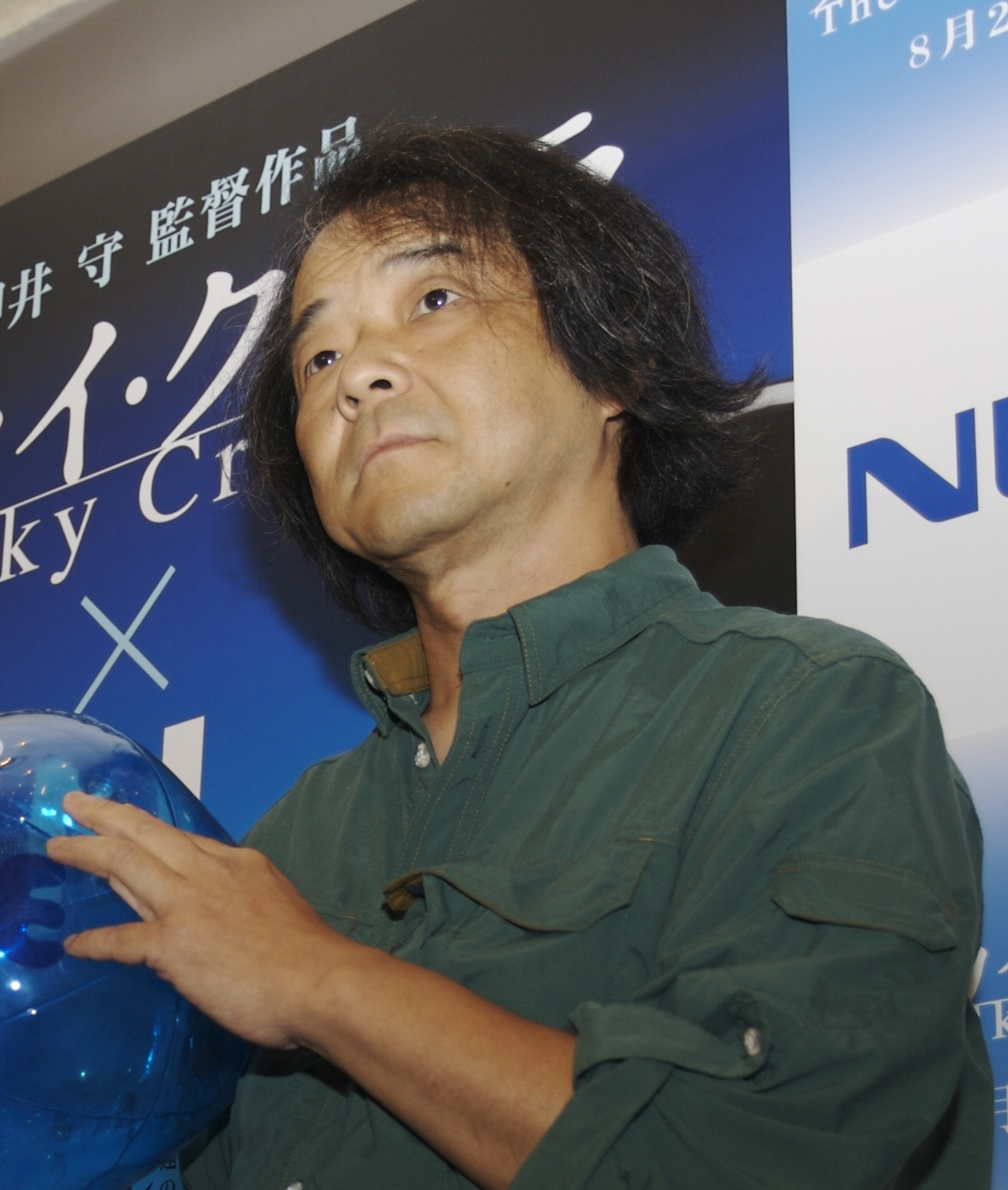
Director Mamoru Oshii in 2008

Mamoru Oshii originally wanted to direct Jin-Roh: The Wolf Brigade after he finished Patlabor 2: The Movie (1993). He proposed the project to Bandai Visual but was asked to direct an adaptation of Masamune Shirow's 1989 manga, Ghost in the Shell, instead. Oshii would later get to work on Jin-Roh, but only as a writer. Oshii stated, "My intuition told me that this story about a futuristic world carried an immediate message for our present world. I am also interested in computers through my own personal experience with them. I had the same feeling about Patlabor and I thought it would be interesting to make a film that took place in the near future. There are only a few movies, even out of Hollywood, which clearly portray the influence and power of computers. I thought this theme would be more effectively conveyed through animation." Oshii expanded on these thoughts in a later interview, noting that technology changes people and had become a part of the culture of Japan. He commented that his use of philosophy caused producers to become frustrated because of sparing use of action scenes. Oshii also acknowledged that a movie with more action would sell better, but he continued to make these movies anyway. When Oshii went back to make changes to the original Ghost in the Shell to re-release it as Ghost in the Shell 2.0, one of the reasons he gave was that the film did not resemble the sequel, and that he wanted to update the film to reflect changes in perspective.

=== Design ===
Hiroyuki Okiura, the character designer and key animation supervisor, designed Motoko to be more mature and serious than Masamune Shirow's original portrayal of the character in the manga. Okiura chose to depict a physically mature person to match Motoko's mental age, instead of her youthful twenty-something appearance in the manga. Motoko's demeanor lacks the comedic facial expressions and rebellious nature depicted in the manga, instead taking on a more wistful and contemplative personality. Oshii based the setting for Ghost in the Shell on Hong Kong, commenting that his first thought to find an image of the future setting was an Asian city, but finding a suitable cityscape of the future would be impossible, and so he chose to use the real streets of Hong Kong as his model. He also said that Hong Kong was the perfect subject and theme for the film with its countless signs and the cacophony of sounds. The film's mecha designer Takeuchi Atsushi noted that while the film does not have a chosen setting, it is obviously based on Hong Kong because the city represented the theme of the film, which was that the old and new exist in a strange relationship during an age of an information deluge. Before shooting the film, the artists drew sketches that emphasized Hong Kong's chaotic, confusing and overwhelming aspects.

=== Animation ===
Ghost in the Shell used a novel process called "digitally generated animation" (DGA), which is a combination of cel animation, computer graphics (CG), and audio that is entered as digital data. In 1995, DGA was thought to be the future of animation, as it allowed traditional animation to be combined with computer graphics and digital cel work with visual displays. Editing was performed on an AVID system of Avid Technology, which was chosen because it was more versatile and less limiting than other methods and worked with the different types of media in a single environment. The digital cel work included both original illustrations, compositions and manipulation with traditional cel animation to create a sense of depth and evoke emotion and feelings. Filters like a lens effect were used to create a sense of depth and motion by distorting the front background and making the far background out of focus throughout shots. Ghost in the Shell used a unique lighting system in which light and darkness were integrated into the cels with attention to light and shadow sources instead of using contrast to control the light. Art director Hiromasa Ogura described this as "a very unusual lighting technique".

Some special effects, like Motoko's "thermo-optical camouflage", were rendered through the use of IG Production's internal tool TIMA. The process uses a single illustration and manipulates the image as necessary to produce distortions for effect in combination with a background without altering the original illustration. The effect is re-added back into the shot to complete the scene. While the visual displays used in the film were technically simple to create, the appearance of the displays underwent numerous revisions by the production team to best represent visual displays of the future. Another aspect of the CG use was to create images and effects that looked as if they were "perceived by the brain" and were generated in video and added to the film in its final stages. The opening credits of the film were produced by the CG director, Seichi Tanaka. Tanaka converted code in a computer language displayed in romanized Japanese letters to numbers before inserting them into the computer to generate the credits. The origin of this code is the names of the film's staff as written in a computer language. Animation director Mizuho Nishikubo was responsible for the realism and strove for accurate depictions of movement and effects. The pursuit of realism included the staff conducting firearms research at a facility in Guam. Nishikubo has highlighted the tank scene as an example of the movie's realism, noting that bullets create sparks when hitting metal, but do not spark when a bullet strikes stone.

=== Audio ===
Ghost in the Shell's recording was done with a high-end studio to achieve superior sound throughout the film. A spatializer was used to alter the sound and, specifically in the electronic brain conversations, modify the characters' voices. Composer Kenji Kawai wrote the film's score. For the main theme, Kawai tried to imagine the setting and convey the essence of that world in the music. He incorporated classical Japanese music and min'yō in the opening theme "Making of a Cyborg". The composition is a mixture of Bulgarian harmony and traditional Japanese notes; the haunting chorals are a wedding song sung to dispel all evil influences. Symphony conductor Sarah Penicka-Smith notes that the song's lyrics are fitting for the union between Kusanagi and Project 2501 at the climax of the film. Kawai originally wanted to use Bulgarian folk music singers, but used Japanese ones instead. "See You Everyday" is different from the rest of the soundtrack, being a pop song sung in Cantonese by Fang Ka Wing.

The ending credits theme of the film's English version is "One Minute Warning" by Passengers, a collaboration between U2 and Brian Eno. The song appeared on the album Original Soundtracks 1, and was one of three songs on that album to actually be featured in a film. Andy Frain, the founder of Manga Entertainment and an executive producer for the film, was a former marketing director for Island Records, the record label that publishes U2's discography.

== Releases ==
The film had its world premiere at the Tokyo International Film Festival on 18 October 1995 before its general release in November. It premiered in the United Kingdom on 11 November 1995 as part of the London Film Festival in Leicester Square. It was originally rated R by the Motion Picture Association of America (MPAA), due to full nudity and graphic violence, when it was first released in the United States.

The film grossed $10 million in global box office revenue, but this fell short of the film's budget, thus failing to recoup production costs. However, a cult following emerged following the film's release on home video, with it grossing approximately $43 million in total box office and home video sales revenue. The English dub of the film was released in the United Kingdom on 8 December 1995 by Metrodome Distribution, and in the United States on 29 March 1996 by Palm Pictures. The "2.0" version was released in theatres in Tokyo, Osaka, Nagoya, Fukuoka, and Sapporo on 12 July 2008. In 2021, the film was given an IMAX restoration and limited theatrical release.

=== Home media ===
In Japan, the film was released on VHS on 26 April 1996. The DVD version was released on 25 February 2004 as a "Special Edition" release, in which the film was fully restored and digitally remastered from the original film elements in both original fullscreen form and in letterboxed widescreen form, and with the audio being digitally remixed in English and Japanese. Ghost in the Shell was released on Blu-ray on 24 August 2007.

In the United States, the film was released on VHS on 18 June 1996 through Manga Entertainment, and on DVD on 31 March 1998 by PolyGram Video. Like the much later Japanese "Special Edition", the DVD is a fully restored and digitally remastered cut with multiple language tracks, but unlike the Japanese release, it includes a 30-minute documentary on the making of the film. Another special edition DVD was released in the United States by Manga Entertainment on 11 January 2005. The special edition contains an additional disc containing character dossiers, a creator biography, the director's biography, and Ghost in the Shell trailers and previews. Manga Entertainment released the film on Blu-ray on 24 November 2009; this version contains the original film and the remastering, but omits the audio commentary and face-to-face interview with Oshii, which are listed on its box. Manga Entertainment and Anchor Bay Entertainment re-released the film on Blu-ray with a brand new HD film print on 23 September 2014. The release was met with criticism for its poorly-translated English subtitles and lack of special features. The film was re-released on UHD 4K Blu-ray by Lionsgate on 8 September 2020.

In August 1996, Ghost in the Shell became the first Japanese film to top the Billboard video sales chart, with over 200,000 VHS copies sold. By 2002, the film's home video releases sold more than 1.6 million units worldwide, including over 100,000 units in Japan and more than 1 million units in the United States. At a retail price of $19.95, the film grossed approximately $32 million in video sales revenue. In 2017, the Blu-ray release sold 26,487 copies and grossed $675,002 in the United States, bringing the film's total worldwide video sales to 1.63 million units and approximately $33 million in gross revenue. The film was the first anime video to reach Billboard's No. 1 video slot at the time of its release. The film ranked as the ninth top-selling anime DVD movie in North America in 2006.

=== Other media ===
Kenji Kawai's original soundtrack for the film was released on 22 November 1995. The last track included Yoshimasa Mizuno's pop song "See You Everyday". After the release of Ghost in the Shell 2.0, an updated version of the soundtrack was released on 17 December 2008. A Photo-CD of the film was released in Japan on 20 November 1995. A spin-off novel written by Endo Akira, titled Ghost in the Shell: Burning City (攻殻機動隊灼熱の都市, Kōkaku kidōtai shakunetsu no toshi), was published by Kodansha and released in Japan in November 1995. It was followed by a sequel, titled Ghost in the Shell 2: Star Seed (攻殻機動隊2: Star Seed), released in January 1998. A book titled Analysis of Ghost in the Shell was released on 25 September 1997, by Kodansha.

=== Ghost in the Shell 2.0 re-release ===
A revised version of the original film, titled Ghost in the Shell 2.0 (GHOST IN THE SHELL / 攻殻機動隊 2.0, Gōsuto in za sheru / Kōkaku kidōtai 2.0), was made in celebration for the release of The Sky Crawlers in 2008. The Ghost in the Shell 2.0 release combines original footage with updated animations, created using new digital film and animation technologies such as 3D-CG. It includes a new opening, digital screens and holographic displays, and omits several brief scenes. The original soundtrack was also re-arranged and re-recorded. Kenji Kawai remixed the Version 2.0 soundtrack in 6.1 Channel Surround. Randy Thom of Skywalker Sound reprised his role as sound designer, having worked previously on Ghost in the Shell 2: Innocence. In the new soundtrack, the Japanese voice dialogue was also re-recorded, with some variation from the original script to modernize the speech. Yoshiko Sakakibara replaced Iemasa Kayumi as the voice of the Puppet Master. The film was re-released in Japanese cinemas via Warner Bros. Pictures on July 12, 2008. 2.0 was re-released in DVD and Blu-ray in Japan on 19 December 2008.

== Reception ==
Ghost in the Shell has received critical acclaim. On review aggregator Rotten Tomatoes, the film has an approval rating of 97% based on 60 reviews, with an average rating of 7.8/10. The website's critical consensus reads, "A stunning feat of modern animation, Ghost in the Shell offers a thoughtful, complex treat for anime fans, as well as a perfect introduction for viewers new to the medium." On Metacritic, the film has a weighted average score of 76 out of 100 based on 14 critics, indicating "generally favorable" reviews.

Niels Matthijs of Twitch Film praised the film, stating, "Not only is Kokaku Kidotai an essential film in the canon of Japanese animation, together with Kubrick's 2001: A Space Odyssey and Tarkovsky's Solaris, it completes a trio of book adaptations that transcend the popularity of their originals and [gives] a new meaning to an already popular brand." Clark Collis of Empire opined that the film was predictable, but praised its production values. Johnathan Mays of Anime News Network gave Ghost in the Shell a rating of A subbed and B+ dubbed, praising the animation combined with the computer effects, calling it "perhaps the best synthesis ever witnessed in anime". Helen McCarthy in 500 Essential Anime Movies describes the film as "one of the best anime ever made", praising its screenplay and "atmospheric score", and adding that "action scenes as good as anything in the current Hollywood blockbuster are supported by CGI effects that can still astonish". In a 1996 review, film critic Roger Ebert rated the film three out of four stars, praising the visuals, soundtrack and themes, but felt that the film was "too complex and murky to reach a large audience ... it's not until the second hour that the story begins to reveal its meaning". In February 2004, Cinefantastique listed the film as one of the "10 Essential Animations" alongside Oshii's 1984 film Beautiful Dreamer. It ranked 35 on Total Film's 2010 top list of 50 Animated Films. The film ranked No. 4 on Wizards Anime Magazine on their "Top 50 Anime released in North America". Raphael See of THEM Anime Reviews gave Ghost in the Shell a 4 out of 5 star rating, handing out praise for the soundtrack, animation, characters, and story, but criticized the ending. See ultimately concluded that "this is still a good, moody flick that anime fans will be talking about for a long time after watching."

=== Awards ===
The film won Best Screenplay at the Yokohama Film Festival and was nominated in five Annie Award categories at the 24th Annie Awards: Best Animated Feature, Best Achievement in Directing (Mamoru Oshii), Best Achievement in Producing (Mitsuhisa Ishikawa, Ken Iyadomi, Ken Matsumoto, Yoshimasa Mizuo, and Shigeru Watanabe), Best Achievement in Production Design (Takashi Watabe and Hiromasa Ogura), and Best Achievement in Writing (Kazunori Itô), but all lost to Toy Story.

=== Ghost in the Shell 2.0 ===
Reviewers were generally critical of the changes made in the 2008 re-release Ghost in the Shell 2.0. David Jenkins of Time Out called the newly-inserted animation "hideous", while D. F. Smith of IGN wrote, "the transitions are painfully jarring – just sudden hard cuts between totally different visual styles – and even viewed in a vacuum, the new CG sequences aren't that impressive". However, both critics still praised the film overall.

== Legacy ==
Ghost in the Shell has influenced prominent filmmakers. The Wachowskis, creators of The Matrix and its sequels, showed it to producer Joel Silver, saying, "We wanna do that for real." The Matrix series took inspiration from several concepts from the film, with the digital rain being inspired by the film's opening credits, and the way characters access the Matrix through holes in the back of their necks, directly paralleling the method of electronic communication in the film. Other parallels have been drawn to James Cameron's Avatar, Steven Spielberg's A.I. Artificial Intelligence, and Jonathan Mostow's Surrogates. Cameron described Ghost in the Shell as "a stunning work of speculative fiction ... the first to reach a level of literary excellence."

== Themes ==
The film explores the nature of human cyborgs, consciousness, self-aware computer programs, and memory alteration. In one of the monologues delivered by the Puppet Master throughout the film, it is argued that the human DNA is nothing more than a program designed to self-preserve. There are also multiple mentions of the act of granting political asylum to self-aware computer programs.

The film depicts Motoko's identity and ontological concerns and ends with the evolution of the Puppet Master, a being incapable of reproduction. Austin Corbett characterized the lack of sexualization from her team as freedom from femininity, noting that Motoko is "overtly feminine, and clearly non-female". Joseph Schaub discusses the gender-defying manner in which the Puppet Master is portrayed, visualized with a blonde woman's bare-chested torso but speaking in a male voice and referred to with masculine pronouns. In describing Motoko as a "shapely" and "strong [female protagonist] at the center of the story" who is "nevertheless almost continuously nude", Roger Ebert noted that "an article about anime in a recent issue of Film Quarterly suggests that to be a 'salary man' in modern Japan is so exhausting and dehumanizing that many men (who form the largest part of the animation audience) project both freedom and power onto women, and identify with them as fictional characters". Carl Silvio has called Ghost in the Shell a "resistant film", due to its inversion of traditional gender roles, its "valorization of the post-gendered subject", and its de-emphasis of the sexual specificity of the material body.

== See also ==
- List of cult films
