= List of Ghost in the Shell characters =

This is a list of fictional characters in the Ghost in the Shell media franchise created by Masamune Shirow.

== Public Security Section 9 members ==
=== Section Chief Directors ===
==== Chief Daisuke Aramaki ====
Voiced by: Tamio Oki (Japanese, films), Osamu Saka (Japanese, Stand Alone Complex), Ikkyu Juku (Japanese; ARISE); Kazuhiro Yamaji (Japanese, 2026 series); William Frederick Knight (English; films, Stand Alone Complex TV series, Bandai Visual dub; 1997 game, 2004 game, 2005 game), Russell Roberts (English; Stand Alone Complex OVAs, Ocean dub), Rik Thomas (English; Stand Alone Complex, Animax Asia dub), John Swasey (English; ARISE, Funimation dub); SungWon Cho (English, 2026 series)
Portrayed by: "Beat" Takeshi Kitano (2017 film)

Lt. Col. Daisuke Aramaki (荒巻 大輔, Aramaki Daisuke) is the Chief Executive Director of Public Security Section 9.

In Stand Alone Complex, Lt. Col. Aramaki is a strict chief, and is informally referred to by Section 9 agents as the "old ape" (most likely because in the original manga he was drawn with a face that appeared to be half monkey, half man). Even so, he is fiercely loyal to the members of Section 9, and often puts his own career on the line to ensure the survival of the rest of his team.

In 2nd GIG, Aramaki uses his political connections and no small amount of bargaining with the new prime minister to get Section 9 reinstated. He is shown to have a disconnected brother of similar age in the Dejima with the refugees, and in Solid State Society it is implied that he is the student of a once-feared military general, as well as that he was once married.

It is revealed in Mamoru Oshii's Ghost in the Shell that Aramaki, together with Togusa, are the only fully human members of Section 9 (aside from a cyberbrain).

- In the Stand Alone Complex Visual Book released by Hobby Japan, Aramaki's hair was poked at for fun in one comic strip when Batou makes some comments about it. Aramaki lifts his hair to reveal metallic parts, possibly for his cyberbrain. This incident freaked Batou out.
- Near the end of Ghost in the Shell: S.A.C. 2nd GIG, Aramaki's missing brother, Yousuke Aramaki (荒巻 洋輔, Aramaki Yōsuke), appears to Kuze and asks him what he intends to do with the refugees. He was last seen in the last episode helping the refugees evacuate to the Dejima bridge via small boats.
- The Solid State Society film reveals that he was estranged from his mentor Colonel Tonoda whom he helped to put in prison (like his character does in the course of the original G.I.T.S manga) sometime before the SAC series began, and that he was actually married at one point.

=== Lead Investigators ===
==== Major Motoko Kusanagi ====
Voiced by: Atsuko Tanaka (Japanese; films, Stand Alone Complex), Maaya Sakamoto (Japanese, ARISE, 2026 series); Mimi Woods (English; first film, 1997 game), Mary Elizabeth McGlynn (English; second film, Stand Alone Complex TV series, Bandai Visual dub; 2004 game, 2005 game, First Assault Online), Alison Matthews (English; Stand Alone Complex OVAs, Ocean dub), Andrea Kwan (English; Stand Alone Complex, Animax Asia dub), Elizabeth Maxwell (English; ARISE, Funimation dub); Suzie Yeung (English, 2026 series);
Portrayed by: Scarlett Johansson (2017 film)

Major Motoko Kusanagi (草薙 素子, Kusanagi Motoko) is a cyborg counter-cyberterrorist field commander in the employ of "Public Security Section 9", a fictional division of the real Japanese National Public Safety Commission, as the squad leader and lead investigator.

==== Batou ====
Voiced by: Akio Otsuka (Japanese; films, Stand Alone Complex), Kenichirou Matsuda (Japanese; ARISE); Hiroki Yasumoto (Japanese, 2026 series); Richard Epcar (English; films, Stand Alone Complex TV Series, Bandai Visual dub; 1997 game, 2004 game, 2005 game, First Assault Online), David Kaye (English; Stand Alone Complex OVAs, Ocean dub), Russell Wait (English; Stand Alone Complex, Animax Asia dub), Christopher Sabat (English; ARISE, Funimation dub); Bill Butts (English, 2026 series);
Portrayed by: Pilou Asbæk (2017 film)

Batou (バトー, Batō) is the lead investigator and main male character in the Ghost in the Shell series. Recruited from the Rangers, Batou is the second best melee fighter in Section 9 and is the second-in-command under Major Motoko Kusanagi. In the movie adaptations of Shirow's manga, Batou is a direct representation of Mamoru Oshii's opinions, views, and feelings that are presented throughout the story.

Although not officially stated, he seems to jointly hold the position of 3rd in command with Ishikawa. He served in the military with Motoko and Ishikawa (under both of them), and has cybernetic eyes that are used by Rangers, improved strength from cybernetic arms, legs, and also contains other unlisted parts (these parts are not stated, but rather implied). He primarily does field work with Togusa, and takes point for the Major on serious occasions.

Batou keeps his private life away from work and his background is mostly unknown. He also gave his favorite Tachikoma an unapproved, non-synthetic oil until the Major caught him. In the first Stand Alone Complex series, the Laughing Man hacked into his eyes so that Batou could not see him. According with Tachikomatic Days of episode 21 (Season 1), he has a can of beer after his bath and he takes out his eyes before going to sleep. Batou is also a chain smoker. He also cares for a cloned basset hound named Gabriel, and Oshii himself possesses a female basset hound named Gabriel. Stand Alone Complex character designer Hajime Shimomura said that Batou's image was based on the Minotaur.

Batou often uses up his paycheck buying muscle training equipment for the upper body, which others find useless, considering his extensive number of cyborg parts (mainly torso and arms). In the first season of Stand Alone Complex, it is inferred that he uses it to remind himself of who he is, despite his cyberization, much like the watch the Major wears. In an interview on the DVD releases of Stand Alone Complex, Batou's Japanese voice actor theorized that Batou's use of exercise equipment was more for the purpose of exercising his mind and self-discipline rather than enhancing his body.

==== Togusa ====
Voiced by: Kōichi Yamadera (Japanese; films, Stand Alone Complex), Tarusuke Shingaki (Japanese, ARISE); Yuichi Nakamura (Japanese, 2026 series); David Richard Thompson (English; first film; 1997 game), Crispin Freeman (English; second film, Stand Alone Complex TV series, Bandai Visual dub; 2004 game, 2005 game), Trevor Devall (English; Stand Alone Complex OVAs, Ocean dub), Darren Pleavin (English; Stand Alone Complex, Animax Asia dub), Alex Organ (English; ARISE, Funimation dub); Nick Apostolides (English, 2026 series);
Portrayed by: Chin Han (2017 film)

Togusa (トグサ) is the lead investigator and second most prominently featured male character in the Ghost in the Shell manga and anime series. In Stand Alone Complex it is stated that he is the only "entirely human" member of Section 9 who has not undergone cybernetic replacement in some manner as he had been referred to as "natural". Togusa is openly suspicious and has reservations regarding technology; while Section 9 agents may respect Togusa's rejection of cybernetic enhancements, the rest of society views people like him as a Luddite. In the 1995 film it is claimed that this is precisely because of his lack of cybernetic enhancements that he was chosen for Kusanagi's team. In the manga, it is unclear as to what extent he has undergone cybernization, although in both anime films and television series he only has cybernetic memory upgrades and other small communication brain implants like all other members.

Togusa is also the only member of Section 9 to not have military experience, having only served as a civilian police officer in the past. To Section 9, Togusa is a reminder to them all of true humanity, because he is a normal person compared to the rest of Section 9. He has a family, and strong moral beliefs that visibly get in his way. He primarily does work with Batou, but also investigates on his own at times. Togusa often plays the role of the idealist in Ghost in the Shell, and could easily be said to be the least likely to win in an even fight against anyone else in Section 9.

Togusa is 27 years old and is 5 feet 10 inches (178 cm) in height. In Solid State Society, he is squad leader of the now expanded Section 9, after Kusanagi's departure and Batou's refusal of the position. It is also stated in Solid State Society that Togusa had finally undergone cyberization, the extent of which, however, is unknown. According to character designer Hajime Shimomura, he did the designs of Togusa based on him being the gentle lion. In addition, Shimomura mentions that he was hard to do since his appearance in the manga looks deformed.

==== Ishikawa ====
Voiced by: Yutaka Nakano (Japanese; films, Stand Alone Complex), Shunsuke Sakuya (Japanese, ARISE); Kousuke Goto (Japanese, 2026 series); Michael Sorich (English, films), Michael McCarty (English; Stand Alone Complex, Bandai Visual dub; 2004 game, 2005 game), John Payne (English; Stand Alone Complex OVAs, Ocean dub), Brandon Potter (English; ARISE, Funimation dub); John Bentley (English, 2026 series);
Portrayed by: Lasarus Ratuere (2017 film)

Ishikawa (イシカワ) is the lead investigator, covert intelligence, information warfare and technology specialist in Public Security Section 9. Ishikawa is a master at recognizing data manipulation, along with being highly skilled at hacking in general. He has a low prosthetic percentage; his character dialogue (and his long recovery time from an injury) suggests that he is one of the least augmented members of Section 9. His appearance is characterized by a large beard and perpetually unkempt hair, and he is the oldest of Section 9's field operatives. Ishikawa is especially well known for his frequent, long-winded and often rather complicated expository speeches to the other characters, in order to inform them (and the show's audience) of new story developments.

He formerly served with Kusanagi and Batou in South America when they were with the Ground Self-Defense Forces in the Japanese UN contingent. He was one of the earliest members recruited to be in Section 9 and seems to know the Major and her dislikes quite well. He is shown as being in charge of a pachinko parlor called Parlor Ishikawa, and on occasion uses the cyberbrains of the old men who play there to complete particularly heavy data gathering (though it seems the men suffer no ill effects or are even aware of their situation, and are in fact 'paid' with wins at pachinko for use of their 'processor' time). Ishikawa is the most seemingly laid-back member of the unit.

Despite being a member of Section 9, Ishikawa appears to be relatively physically weak in comparison to the other members. He is almost never shown in combat (though in one episode he fires a shoulder-mounted cannon to disable a heavily armored vehicle) and takes a support role during most missions in which he is dispatched. When he is captured late in the first season, he is shown as being easily taken into custody by Umibozu commandos sent to arrest him. This is possibly due to the fact that he is one of the least cybernetically enhanced members (along with Togusa and Saito) and thus, would have been at a disadvantage had he physically resisted. Late into the second series, Ishikawa is wounded in a suicide bomb attack on Section 9's tilt wing aircraft. Following this he is seen hospitalized and wearing a bandage on his left arm, this lends credit to the theory that he has little external cyberization, especially when in contrast to Batou's quick recovery from wounds in the same episode.

- As a point of humor, a bottle of what appears to be Chivas Regal is seen in his office in the closing animation of season 1, as well as a similar bottle appearing in the first Ghost in the Shell movie, though no indications are given that he is alcoholic. It is known that he smokes cigarettes and cigars on occasion, particularly in stressful circumstances.
  - In the 2017 film, he jokes that he got a prosthetic liver so he could drink without worry.
- As stated in 2nd GiG episode 12, Ishikawa is a fan of American super hero comics.
- Ishikawa also makes an appearance in Ghost in the Shell 2: Innocence to deliver important information to Batou.
- According with Tachikomatic Days of episode 22 (Season 1), he has a glass of milk after his bath and he takes off his beard before going to sleep. This was meant to contrast with the previous episode (21), that stated that Batou has a beer after his bath and takes out his cybernetic eyeballs before going to sleep. Tachikomatic Days are not meant to be taken seriously.

=== Specialists ===
==== Saito ====
Voiced by: Tōru Ōkawa (Japanese; films, Stand Alone Complex), Takuro Nakakuni (Japanese, ARISE); Toru Nara (Japanese, 2026 series); Dave Wittenberg (English; films, Stand Alone Complex TV Series, Bandai Visual dub; 2004 game, 2005 game), Brian Drummond (English; Stand Alone Complex OVAs, Ocean dub), Marcus Stimac (English; ARISE, Funimation dub); Tony Weaver Jr. (English, 2026 series);
Portrayed by: Yutaka Izumihara (2017 film)

Saito (サイトー, Saitō) is Section 9's tactical sniper specialist. Known to have been a mercenary in the South American campaign, Saito was recruited by the Major while they were on opposing sides. He can handle any automatic firearm with deadly accuracy and precision. Regarded as one of the least cyberized, Saito's left arm is cybernetic, allowing him to support and steady extremely large Anti-materiel rifles with superhuman skill. His left eye was replaced with the "Hawkeye", a prosthetic eye that interfaces with satellites to allow for shots of incredible accuracy. The Hawkeye, however, can be hacked, as it is in Episode 2 of SAC. It is impossible for Saito to escape hacking by going into autistic mode because he needs to maintain his Hawkeye's satellite uplink. Saito is also valued for his ability to think like enemy snipers; on two separate occasions his ability at determining sniping locations impacted Section 9's actions.

Character designer Hajime Shimomura had commented that Saito was not difficult to do, although he said he had drawing ideas based on someone who would wear "a bleached cotton cloth wrapped around his chest and wears a loincloth." Anime Vision.com has said that Saito's presence in the episode "Poker Face" is intriguing since he did not confirm if he really encountered Motoko Kusanagi during his mercenary days, keeping his past hidden from his fellow officers.

==== Borma ====
Voiced by: Taro Yamaguchi (Japanese; films, Stand Alone Complex), Kazuya Nakai (Japanese, ARISE), Atsushi Miyauchi (Japanese, 2026 series); Dean Wein (English; Stand Alone Complex TV Series, Bandai Visual dub; 2004 game, 2005 game), Mark Gibbon (English; Stand Alone Complex OVAs, Ocean dub), Phil Parsons (English; ARISE, Funimation dub), Rich Brown (English, 2026 series)
Portrayed by: Tawanda Manyimo (2017 film)

Borma (ボーマ, Bōma; Originally romanized as Boma in the manga) is Section 9's explosive weapons and bomb disposal specialist, providing rear support for the rest of the unit and handles heavy weaponry during assignments, as shown several times during 2nd GIG. He also works as the team's resident cyberviral warfare expert, often developing vaccines for viruses within minutes of their creation. Like many of the members of Section 9, Borma is part cyborg. Though he's "kind of the silent type," he also packs some of the most explosive weapons of the Section 9 team.

Borma is the jack of all trades who often handles the task of rear support. "He originally was basically "the backup", and meant to be carrying the large caliber heavy assault weapons. He carries a shotgun. It's a bigger gun, just like Batou", stated Tawanda Manyimo. In most assignments, he's the only member to carry heavy weaponry. He is usually teamed with either Saito for sniper team duties, Paz for general operations and Ishikawa for cyberweb research and viral warfare. Due to his various jobs behind the scenes, Borma's character receives the least attention of any member of Section 9.

Borma was in the JSDF as a demolitions expert, possibly hinting that he was either a combat engineer or a special forces operative. This character's name is often pronounced as its Japanese counterpart as Boma. Borma is the only Section 9 operative with similar height and enhanced strength to Batou. He also has optical implant eyes of a similar general design to Batou's, though his optics are a different color, indicating another model with different capabilities. Both his eyes and his baldness are his trademark features.

==== Ladriya ====
Portrayed by: Danusia Samal (2017 film)

Ladriya is an original character appearing exclusively in the 2017 film, and is the only member of the team not drawn specifically from any Ghost in the Shell source material. She is Section 9's advanced weapons specialist and is skilled in close quarters knife combat.

Samal regards Ladriya as "one of the more intuitive of the gang." "She's a bit feisty, she's a bit cheeky as well. But when it comes down to it I'm quite proud of the fact that she's quite ruthless when it's necessary", said Samal. Though Samal had to build the character from scratch, she said she drew some inspiration from one of the male Section 9 characters who didn't make it to the big screen (such as Paz) who is "a bit of a lady killer" in the manga. She used that to color in her version of the character, saying, "I thought, 'Wouldn't it be great if Ladriya is a bit like the female equivalent of that? Like a tiny bit into blokes.'"

=== Field agents ===
==== Paz ====
Voiced by: Takashi Onozuka (Japanese; films, Stand Alone Complex), Yōji Ueda (Japanese, ARISE), Yūya Uchida (Japanese; 2026 series); Bob Buchholz (English; Stand Alone Complex TV series, Bandai Visual dub; 2004 game, 2005 game), John Murphy (English; Stand Alone Complex OVAs; Ocean dub), Jason Douglas (English; ARISE, Funimation dub), Ray Chase (English; 2026 series)

Paz (パズ, Pazu) is an investigator and "deep-cover" infiltration specialist in Section 9. Before joining Public Security Section 9, Paz was rumored by various police circles to have been a gangster in several yakuza groups in Japan. Paz is the backup "jack-of-all-trades" for the field agents and is also a known chain smoker within the unit. Upon his first encounter with the Major, he remarked, "I never sleep with the same woman twice." His basis for such is later found to be that he does not want to pull others into the world he lives in. He uses a folding knife in combat.

In SAC 2nd GIG episode 13, Paz encounters an ex-lover scorned (Kaori Kawashima) who had adopted a body that was identical to his own down to the smallest detail. A knife fight ensues, and one "Paz" is stabbed through the eye and killed. It isn't made clear whether or not the victim was the real Paz or the impostor (Kaori), as they both have cuts across their torsos, and the surviving "Paz" says nothing. However, the torso wound of the deceased Paz appeared to be deeper, suggesting that the original survived. His name is often pronounced as its Japanese counterpart, Pazu in Ghost in the Shell: Stand Alone Complex series.

==== Azuma ====
Voiced by: Masahiro Ogata (Japanese); Erik Davies (English, Bandai Visual dub)

Azuma (アズマ) is one of Public Security Section 9's new recruits in S.A.C 2nd GIG. Azuma was recruited as one of the field operatives in Section 9 from JGSDF Intelligence. He was present at the shipyard battle in which fellow rookie Yano died and was pulled out of field duty prior to the Dejima confrontation. At the end of 2nd Gig it is implied that Azuma is now a full-fledged member of Section 9.

Azuma is featured prominently at the beginning of Ghost in the Shell: Stand Alone Complex - Solid State Society, supporting Togusa in an incident at the airport, as well as in Ghost in the Shell 2: Innocence.

Azuma also shows up in the manga Ghost in the Shell: Human-Error Processor 1.5 by Masamune Shirow as a source of comedy.

==== Yano ====
Yano (ヤノ) is one of Public Security Section 9's new recruits in 2nd GIG. Yano was recruited by Section 9 as a rookie and field operative. Yano was killed in the raid on Kuze's false location in the 2nd GIG episode "Chain Reaction", making him Section 9's first officer to be killed in the line of duty from hostile gunfire. Yano also appears briefly in the manga as a new recruit. In the manga he was killed by a Russian named Koil Krasnov, whom he was tailing as his first assignment.

==== Proto ====
Voiced by: Oki Sugiyama (Japanese); Richard Miro (English, Bandai Visual dub), Andrew Toth (English, Ocean dub)

Proto (プロト, Puroto) is one of Public Security Section 9's new recruits in 2nd GIG. Proto is Section 9's only (prototype) bioroid member and was also the Tachikoma's maintenance technician (before becoming one of the new recruits). During the Dejima crisis Proto played a key role in helping Aramaki rescue the Prime Minister Yoko Kayabuki, who had been relieved of her duty and arrested under charges of treason.

Proto managed to gain access to the net, where he communicated with Section 9's Tachikoma units. Through them Proto was able to gain building blueprints and up-to-date information on Section 9's Dejima operation, as well as the location of the Prime Minister, before an attack barrier disabled him. Proto appears again in the Ghost in the Shell: Stand Alone Complex - Solid State Society movie, wearing the black uniform of Section 9 along with a sidearm, which suggests that he is now a field officer.

==== Maven ====
Voiced by: Cristina Valenzuela (English, First Assault Online)

Maven is an original character appearing only in Ghost in the Shell: Stand Alone Complex - First Assault Online. She is Section 9's resident expert on guerilla warfare and topography, stemming from her time in the jungles of South America. She first came to Chief Aramaki's attention during an operation in which she single-handedly held off an insurgent attack after her entire squad was killed. Since then, she has been working for Section 9, where she has proven both resourceful and deadly.

R&D combat specialist who proved herself to be a lethal operative during the conflicts in South America. She has a fiery temper and the skills to match. Maven worked with the Kodansu Corporation during WWIV where she served in R&D and field testing of technologies. She spearheaded the development of the therm-optic barrier to aid in the evacuation of refugees during the Bolivia Crisis. With the passing of Bill 196J, the Kodansu Corporation was effectively shut down and all its research and equipment was appropriated by the Japanese government. Following this, Maven found work with police forces in Fukuoka. She was later acquired by Section 9 to aid in the deployment of her past research projects. Though it is not known just how much of her body is cybernetic, it is suspected that she has experimental prosthetics from her time working for Kodansu.

=== AI Personnel ===
==== Think tanks ====
In the various editions of Ghost in the Shell, Section 9 utilizes different kinds of "multi-legged tanks" (多脚戦車, takyakusensha), or "think tanks" (思考戦車, Shinku; the kanji are read as "Think" rather than Shikōsensha). All seem to act like children.

===== Fuchikoma =====
Voiced by: Katsue Miwa (Japanese, 1997 video game), Tomoko Kaneda (Japanese, 2026 series); Julie Maddalena (English, 1997 video game), Lizzie Freeman (English, 2026 series)

In the original manga, the 1997 video game and the 2026 anime The Ghost in the Shell, the think tanks used by Section 9 are the Fuchikoma (フチコマ).

===== Tachikoma =====
Voiced by: Sakiko Tamagawa (Japanese); Melissa Fahn, Rebecca Forstadt, Lara Jill Miller, Sandy Fox, Sherry Lynn, Julie Maddalena, Peggy O'Neal, Lia Sargent, and Michelle Ruff (English)

The Tachikoma (タチコマ) are the think tanks utilized by Section 9 in the Stand Alone Complex series. In both the manga and television series, one spider-tank is preferred by Batou who uses a natural oil to lubricate its parts, and this usage of natural oil and its experiences with Batou begin to disseminate through the others, slowly causing the whole group of them to develop their AIs into separate identities, which Kusanagi begins to suspect are unique Ghosts. This leads to their decommissioning, although they all react to the Umibouzu assault on Section 9 and try to help, but their new hardware for civilian work prevents them from doing so. In the premiere of 2nd GIG, Batou is pleased to see that the Tachikoma have been recommissioned, but when one speaks with the original robotic voice he is disheartened until the Tachikoma breaks into laughter, revealing that they have retained their ghosts. At the end of 2nd GIG, when the American Empire is attempting to bomb Dejima, the Tachikoma finish saving the refugees' ghosts before uploading their own ghosts into the satellite that contains their AI to stop the final missile, resulting in their apparent death. In the final scene of 2nd GIG, Section 9 is seen using new think tanks known as Uchikoma (ウチコマ), devoid of the individuality of their Tachikoma predecessors as well as an inferior AI. With the return of Kusanagi during Solid State Society, it is revealed that the Tachikoma's AIs were spared from destruction, with Kusanagi accompanied by the "ghosts" of two of them, now calling themselves Max (マックス, Makkusu) and Musashi (ムサシ). Musashi, who has modified its digital self to be yellow in color, is Batou's preferred Tachikoma. In the novelization of the film, the other Tachikoma AIs have also given themselves names: Loki (ロキ, Roki), Conan (コナン, Konan), Rex (レックス, Rekkusu), Triton (トリトン, Toriton), Chewy (チューイ, Chūi), Shiva (シーヴァ, Shīva), and Hannibal (ハニバル, Hanibaru).

===== Logicoma =====
Voiced by: Miyuki Sawashiro

In the events of Ghost in the Shell: Arise, the burgeoning Section 9 uses a think tank known as the Logicoma (ロジコマ, Rojikoma), short for Logistics Conveyer Machine (ロジスティックス・コンベイヤー・マシン, Rojisutikkusu Konbeiyā Mashin).

== Recurring characters ==
=== Activists and criminals ===
==== Project 2501 ====
Voiced by: Kayumi Iemasa (Japanese, original voice), Yoshiko Sakakibara (Japanese, re-release), Kikuko Inoue (Japanese, 2026 series); Tom Wyner (English; as "Abe Lasser"), Ariana Nicole George (English, 2026 series)

The "Puppeteer" (人形使い, Ningyō-tsukai; "Puppet Master" in the film) is the main antagonist of the original Ghost in the Shell manga as well as in the first film. Although it is first suspected of being a super hacker, capable of "ghost hacking", or taking control of a cyberized person's body without their knowledge, Section 9 later discovers that it is actually an advanced artificial intelligence program, known as Project 2501, created by Section 6, the Treaty Bureau of Japan's Ministry of Foreign Affairs. When Project 2501 went rogue, Section 6 was able to trap it in a firewalled system, but it escaped after using a factory to produce a robot body that gets hit by a truck and taken in by Section 9. When the truth is revealed to Section 9, the "Puppet Master" demands asylum as a sentient creature, arguing that its self-preserving programming is no different from DNA. After a battle between Section 6 and Section 9, Major Motoko Kusanagi manages to link with the "Puppet Master" and converses with it, learning that it wishes to preserve itself and pass on its ideas as any biological creature would, but rather than make copies of itself with the same weaknesses and flaws, it wishes to merge with Kusanagi. Although she fears that she will lose her individuality, Project 2501 reminds her about identity and change and impermanence. Motoko finally agrees and the "Puppet Master" is merged with her ghost, just as Section 6 snipers destroy the robot shell and severely damage the Major's own prosthetic body.

==== Laughing Man ====
Voiced by: Koichi Yamadera (Japanese); Steve Blum (English, Stand Alone Complex TV series; Bandai Visual dub), Michael Adamthwaite (English; Stand Alone Complex OVAs, Ocean dub)

The Laughing Man (笑い男, Warai Otoko), Aoi (アオイ), is an anti-corporate terrorist hacker, who ultimately reveals to the Major that he had discovered that several micromachine manufacturing corporations, in association with the Japanese government, suppressed information on an inexpensive cure to a debilitating cyberization disease in order to profit from the more expensive micromachine treatment. He also had a fascination with J. D. Salinger's The Catcher in the Rye, his own alias coming from Salinger's short story, "The Laughing Man". He is an expert hacker, able to hide his physical presence by editing himself out of video feeds and cybernetic eyes, concealing his identity by superimposing an animated logo over his face, and hijacking cybernetic brains altogether, all in real-time. The Complex story arc of Stand Alone Complex focuses on the Laughing Man case, and on a medical/governmental conspiracy tied into the fate of the Laughing Man.

The Laughing Man logo was designed by Paul Nicholson, a London-based designer for graphics and clothing company, Terratag. Nicholson was asked to read a short story by J.D. Salinger, "The Laughing Man," and to base the logo on that. The story centers around a boys' after school organization called the Commanche Club. The Commanche Club's Chief often brings the boys to Central Park for baseball games, and these games are the source of the baseball cap featured in the logo. The text given to Nicholson by Production I.G. read: "I thought what I'd do was, I'd pretend I was one of those deaf-mutes." The phrase is an excerpt from The Catcher in the Rye, also by Salinger. Nicholson said of the latter, "At first this text made no sense but now, having seen the whole series, I can understand the relevance to the character." Another reference taken directly from J. D. Salinger's short story "The Laughing Man" occurs in episode 11, titled "Portraits/In The Forest of the Imagoes". In this episode a child at a vocational aid center refers to a character named Chief who is going to visit, Chief is the name given by the children to The Laughing Man as well as the main character's childhood idol in the short story. The Laughing Man logo has been co-opted by pop culture in advocacy for the Electronic Frontier Foundation and the loose hacktivist collective Anonymous (using the latter's motto "We are Anonymous. We are Legion. We do not forgive. We do not forget. Expect us.").

==== Individual Eleven ====
Logo of the Individual Eleven

The Individual Eleven (個別の11人, Kobetsu no Jū-ichi-nin) is a fictional terrorist group that Public Security Section 9 deal with in Ghost in the Shell: S.A.C. 2nd GIG. Their motives are to suppress the refugees into despair and show Japan that they do not belong.

The Individual Eleven bases their name and motive from the essay, "The Individual Eleven", which is actually a fake essay implanted with a computer virus that infects all who read it, and even infects Borma of Section 9, although through quick action, he shows no further signs of symptoms as a result. The virus remains dormant up until the user downloads all of the other ten essays by Patrick Sylvestre (a fictional political theorist), when it programs the person infected by it to commit suicide. However, the virus itself does not cause the members of the Individual Eleven to commit the acts of terror; it is their own political views which cause them to do so. Kuze is the only member to be unaffected by the Individual Eleven virus.

The eleventh essay supposedly refers to the events surrounding the May 15 Incident, which was one of several incidents that led to the rise of Japanese militarism. The virus only affects those who possess cyberbrains, and, in addition, it is suggested by Kazundo Goda that the virus affects only those individuals who were virgins prior to undergoing full cyberization.

The Individual Eleven logo was designed by TERRATAG. The logo shows three characters. From top to bottom, they stand for three different numbers (9, 10 and 11). At the same time, in as Kanji they mean Vengeance (仇, Ada), Infinity (∞, Mugen), and Samurai (士).

The logo is used as the mysterious mark of the terrorists in much the same way as a traditional Japanese family mark (kamon) or a samurai logo on their flag.

==== Hideo Kuze ====
Voiced by: Rikiya Koyama (Japanese); Kirk Thornton (English, Bandai Visual dub), John Murphy (English; Stand Alone Complex OVA; Ocean dub)
Portrayed by: Michael Carmen Pitt (2017 film)

Hideo Kuze (クゼ・ヒデオ, Kuze Hideo) is an architect, a former SDF member, and a member of the Individual Eleven terrorist group whose formation was brought about by Kazundo Goda. He is the second primary adversary of Section 9, along with Goda, in 2nd GIG. Unlike the rest of the Individual Eleven members, Kuze does not commit suicide. Instead, he identifies with the grievances of the sizable refugee population in Japan, assuming leadership of a refugee resistance movement. It is later revealed Kuze and Motoko had known each other since childhood, and were involved in the same plane crash that forced them to transfer into prosthetic bodies to survive. They both became separated afterwards and Kuze joined the JSDF, where he became disillusioned with Japan's foreign and domestic policies and deserted, eventually resurfacing as the leader of the refugees.

When the JSDF attack Dejima, Kuze leads the defense of the city while at the same time ensuring the noncombatant refugees are evacuated. He assists Section 9 in averting the nuclear strike aimed at Dejima and is subsequently arrested. However, he is assassinated by American Empire agents in order to prevent him from becoming a new symbol for the refugees.

According to the interview with Takayuki Goto, Kuze is modeled after the half-Japanese and half-Taiwanese actor Takeshi Kaneshiro.

Kuze appears in the live action adaptation, portrayed by Michael Pitt, though this Kuze takes on aspects of the Puppet Master's characterization, including having a proficiency for hacking and a desire to fuse his psyche with that of the Major.

==== The Puppeteer (Solid State Society) ====
The Puppeteer (傀儡廻, Kugutsumawashi) is the name of an entity responsible for controlling the remote body of Civil Servant Tateaki Koshiki (コシキ・タテアキ, Koshiki Tateaki). According to dialogue in Solid State Society, Tateaki Koshiki died mysteriously at home from illness, but that his remote was subsequently involved in the conspiracy that was uncovered during the course of the film. The existence of a hidden Puppeteer was therefore theorized to have been responsible for Tateaki Koshiki's actions following his demise.

After distinguishing himself, Tateaki Koshiki got reassigned to the Health-Welfare joint project headed by Ito Munei. He secretly built his own infrastructure into the project sometime during its development. This infrastructure abducted children at risk from their families and sheltered them with the Noble Rot Senior Citizens (貴腐老人, Kifu Rōjin), who would bequeath them their wealth upon death, before the children were finally brought to Munei's secret education facilities at the Seishomin Welfare Center (聖庶民救済センター, Seishomin Kyūsai Sentā).

The Puppeteer's role was also in using his hub-cyberbrain to crystallize the rhizome of the Noble Rot Senior Citizens that utilized the Healthcare network to become the "Solid State Society".

Alternatively, it is suggested by Batou that The Puppeteer may have been the personification of the collective consciousness of the Noble Rot Senior Citizens. However, it is also heavily implied that the Puppeteer was a part of Motoko's subconscious, which began acting independently during her time diving the Net.

=== Government personnel ===
==== Yoko Kayabuki ====
Voiced by: Yoshiko Sakakibara (Japanese); Barbara Goodson (English, Bandai Visual dub), Ellen Kennedy (English, Ocean dub)

Yoko Kayabuki (茅葺 よう子, Kayabuki Yōko) is Japan's newly elected prime minister in Stand Alone Complex 2nd GIG.

Kayabuki first appears in Ghost in the Shell: Stand Alone Complex 2nd GIG and is elected as Japan's first female prime minister. She reinstates Section 9 after a deal was made with Aramaki in the Stand Alone Complex, 2 years after the raid by Umibozu commandos on Section 9's headquarters. Politically, she was selected by the ruling party as an internal political movement to conservatism in the wake of the Laughing Man scandal that brought down the previous government. However, she was perceived as being politically weak - the Cabinet at this time was increasing in political power and becoming led by personality rather than by electoral responsibility. The undercurrent of secret manipulation by the Cabinet Intelligence Agency through the Individual Eleven / Refugee Crisis sought to make the Prime Minister a rubber stamping figurehead.

Kayabuki becomes a victim of the Individual Eleven and is involved with Section 9's investigation into the case. During the refugee crisis, she is arrested under charges of treason for requesting United Nations intervention in the crisis, though this action on the part of the Ruling Party chairman was not sanctioned by either party, or electorate - her escape from custody and the aid of Section 9 prevented this secret coup d'état from becoming a reality, and also then sent a clear signal to the American Empire that Japan prefers a Stand-alone status within the international community.

This demonstration of capability, and the calling in of favours owed at the height of the crisis increased her ability to control Japan in the wake thereof. She also demonstrated that she held clout from a military stand-point: The JASDF was her tool of choice for reminding the contending land and sea force commanders where Japan's true military prowess was to be found, from both a domestic and military stand-point. Kayabuki displayed great wisdom by selecting Daisuke Aramaki and Major Kusanagi as personal advisors that prevented potentially cataclysmic events during the beginning of her premiership.

She appears briefly in Ghost in the Shell: Stand Alone Complex - Solid State Society, where she remains Prime Minister, and Daisuke Aramaki's immediate superior.

In the 1st episode of the series Ghost in the Shell: SAC 2045, Kayabuki appears in portrait form on the wall of the Public Security Bureau, while Aramaki makes a telephone call to Togusa. She immediately precedes the new Prime Minister featuring in the series.

==== Kazundo Gōda ====
Voiced by: Ken Nishida (Japanese); John Snyder (English, Bandai Visual dub), French Tickner (English, Ocean dub)

Kazundo Gōda (合田 一人, Gōda Kazundo) is head of a data manipulation division within the Cabinet Intelligence Service and is one of the primary adversaries of Section 9 during the second anime series 2nd GIG. His face was badly disfigured in an accident during his youth, but he chose not to have it reconstructed, reasoning that his scars would leave a greater impression on people. During the series, Motoko Kusanagi hacks into the Cabinet Intelligence Agency database to try to determine what Gōda's motives are. She learns that Gōda has given up dreams of power and instead works to facilitate the emergence of a hero for the masses in order to produce a conflict situation that will force a change in direction for Japan, a change that Gōda believes will return it to its glory days. To that end, Gōda masterminds the formation of the Individual Eleven terrorist group and the emergence of Hideo Kuze as the leader of alienated refugees.

It is later revealed that Gōda's true intentions are to instigate a conflict between the refugees and the Japanese government, which would convince Japan to sign a landmark security treaty with the American Empire. After his plans are foiled by Section 9, he attempts to seek asylum in the American Empire but is assassinated by Motoko under Kayabuki's orders.

==== Kubota ====
Voiced by: Taimei Suzuki (Japanese); Michael Forest (English, Bandai Visual dub) John Novak (English, Ocean dub)

Kubota (久保田, Kubota) is an army Intelligence Officer and former colleague of Aramaki. He often provides Aramaki with inside information. He appears to be of the same JGSDF Academy Class as Chief Aramaki, and appears to have the rank of colonel, though he is also interested in advancing his career politically, often handing unpleasant tasks over to Section 9 in order to prevent blame for 'dirty business' being officially attached to his record of conduct.

==== Takakura ====
Voiced by: Yoshinori Muto (Japanese); Eddie Jones (English, Bandai Visual dub; first voice), William Bassett (English, Bandai Visual dub; second voice)

As the Chief Cabinet Secretary, Takakura (高倉) is the main powerbroker within the Kayabuki government. He is in league with Kazundo Goda and helps to further the CIS's aims. During the Dejima conflict, Takakura attempts to stage a coup d'état to oust Kayabuki from power. With the help of Section 9, Kayabuki is able to thwart Takakura's plans and has him arrested.

=== Civilians ===
==== Ran and Kurutan ====
Ran voiced by: Houko Kuwashima (Japanese; 2026 series); Rebecca Wang (English; 2026 series)
Kurutan voiced by: Yuko Sumitomo (Japanese; Stand Alone Complex), Mai Nakahara (Japanese; 2026 series); Amanda Winn-Lee (English, Bandai Visual dub), Saffron Henderson (English; Stand Alone Complex OVAs, Ocean dub), Emi Lo (English; 2026 series)

Both Kurutan and Ran first appeared in Ghost in the Shell during a virtual threesome with Kusanagi. Kurutan is a bright-haired nurse featured in Stand Alone Complex, episode 8, where an organ trafficking case involved two of her patients. She calls in Kusanagi and Section 9 after the police investigation flounders. In episode 22, Kurutan acts a "witness" during Kusanagi's body-swapping procedure. Ran is dark-haired; during episode 5, Kusanagi was in Kurutan's apartment, borrowing her virtual reality equipment to review the "Laughing Man" case.
