= Tachikoma =

Fictional robot brand from Ghost in the Shell

- Ghost in the Shell: Stand Alone Complex character
- Tachikoma model for Ghost in the Shell: Stand Alone Complex
- First appearance: Ghost in the Shell #02 "Super Spartan" (1989) (as Fuchikoma); Ghost in the Shell: Stand Alone Complex episode 1: "SA: Public Security Section 9 – SECTION-9" (2002) (as Tachikoma)
- Created by: Masamune Shirow
- Voiced by: Japanese Katsue Miwapanese (Fuchikoma, 1997 video game) Sakiko Tamagawa (Tachikoma, Stand Alone Complex) Miyuki Sawashiro (Logicoma, Arise, The New Movie) Tomoko Kaneda (Fuchikoma, The Ghost in the Shell TV series) English Julie Maddalena (Fuchikoma, 1997 video game) Melissa Fahn, Rebecca Forstadt, Lara Jill Miller, Sandy Fox, Sherry Lynn, Julie Maddalena, Peggy O'Neal, Lia Sargent, and Michelle Ruff (Tachikoma, Stand Alone Complex) Jad Saxton (Logicoma, Arise, The New Movie) Lizzie Freeman (Fuchikoma, The Ghost in the Shell TV series)

Tachikoma (Japanese: タチコマ) are fictional walker robots endowed with artificial intelligence (AI) that are featured in the Ghost in the Shell universe. They appear in the manga created by Masamune Shirow (as Fuchikoma) and in the Stand Alone Complex sub-universe. Nine of them are initially deployed to Section 9. They are spider-like, multi-legged combat vehicles, and are equipped with adaptive artificial intelligence. The spider design appears in other places in Shirow's work such as the Appleseed manga. Shirow is noted to keep numerous spiders as pets.

== Design ==
A 3D model of a Tachikoma unit. Throughout the Stand Alone Complex animated series, Tachikoma characters were rendered by 3D software using a shader that mimics hand-drawn art. This method simplified the task of animating detailed robotic characters. The right-most image is a wire frame of the 3D model; the middle image is the Tachikoma model rendered with generic materials and lighting; the left-most image is the character as it appears in the series.

Tachikoma are as large as an average sedan, are painted blue and have four "eyes" fitted on the surface of their bodies. Three are on the "head" and one is beneath the "abdomen". Each eye has three pinholes, loosely resembling a bowling ball. These eyes sometimes become expressive in the typical anime style. Tachikoma are controlled by individual AIs, are capable of speech and generally exhibit a childish, curious, joyful and active personality, although they are consummate professionals in the field. They normally operate as independent units and receive orders from human agents, but they can also be directly piloted from a cockpit in their abdomen. The Tachikoma's design is implicitly based on that of the jumping spider in terms of bio-mechanical modelling, and system technical design was based on the Fuchikoma.

Tachikoma have two arms and four legs. They can move by walking, or they can drive at high speed by using the wheeled footpads on each of their four legs. Each wheel appears to be angled and omnidirectional, allowing the Tachikomas to move in any direction with their drive system, which can control all degrees of freedom in its task space. Other abilities of the Tachikoma include jumping great distances, sticking to vertical or inverted surfaces, engaging a thermoptic camouflage mechanism, and grappling/rappelling using their adhesive string launchers. Tachikoma maintain control of their legs while using wheels to drive down a road, and shift their weight around turns. They can also roll briefly on to two legs while driving to avoid an obstacle or pass through a narrow space. To make balance easier, they can move their heavy abdomens with a ball joint.

Standard Tachikoma equipment includes a 7.62×51mm light machine gun mounted in the right arm, a secondary weapon hardpoint in the "snout" (a 50 mm grenade launcher, capable of launching both explosive and gas grenades which can be replaced by a six-barrelled 12.7×99mm Gatling gun), a universal cybernetic connector on an extensible, prehensile cable in the left arm, liquid wires that can be used for grappling, rappelling or for restraining purposes and a built-in thermoptic camouflage system. As seen several times in the anime, they are lightly armored, resisting small-caliber firearms, though heavier automatic weapons or explosives can easily wreck them.

== Description ==
Though they possess individual artificial intelligence, every night they are synchronized, so they start the next day with identical consciousnesses that are each the sum of their total collective experience and development. This leads to identity confusion, since each Tachikoma has the same memories. Though the Tachikoma have identical memories, their personalities and opinions are distinct. It is explained in the last episode of the first season that it is their curiosity that lets them be different from each other.

These individual personalities are distinct among Tachikoma. One considers itself Batou's personal Tachikoma, which has the personality of a hyperactive child. It is special, given that Batou pampers it with natural oil and refuses to operate any other while on assignments. The second Tachikoma is more logical, acting as the straight man to the first. The third Tachikoma appears somewhat slower than the others, and at times has difficulty keeping up with the other Tachikomas when discussing such in-depth topics as what it means to be "alive". There is also a fourth Tachikoma with a distinctive personality, who is a bookworm and an intellectual. Its body was taken apart during the experimentation incident, but its AI has presumably been saved for further analysis. During finale of the first S.A.C. season, while all but three of the Tachikomas are either locked away in a lab or dismantled for study, three surviving Tachikoma units abandon their civilian posts to assist the Major and Batou.

Dr. Asuda is the government researcher who single-handedly developed the neurochip used in the Tachikomas' AI and is considered by the Tachikomas to be their father. In the episode "Afternoon of the Machines – PAT," Asuda tries unsuccessfully to defect from Japan, because as a state-funded scientist, he is not allowed to hold patents on his inventions. Following his re-capture, the Tachikoma who is with The Major and Batou asks whether Dr. Asuda is its father. Desiring to leave a record of his achievement, Asuda inserted a trace of himself in the Tachikomas' memory during their reconstruction post-season 1. To prevent another collapse in the AI structural integrity, he decided to delete this last bit of sentimentality.

== Appearances ==
=== Stand Alone Complex ===
In episode 12 of the Ghost in the Shell: Stand Alone Complex, one slightly malfunctioning Tachikoma goes on a joy-ride through the city, where it meets a young girl named Miki who is looking for a lost dog. The episode is mostly comedy but turns serious, with the Tachikoma attempting to understand sadness and death. In a later episode, the Tachikomas argue among themselves over which met Miki, since they all have the same memory. Yet when Batou calls for his Tachikoma only his actual Tachikoma raises its hand. As it leaves with Batou, it suddenly remarks with quiet surprise that it indeed must have been the one that met Miki.

Batou has the most affection for the tanks, picking out one tank as his "personal unit" and spoiling it with natural oil instead of synthetic. This is what causes his to go haywire later, when the natural oil dissolves some of the proteins in the Tachikoma's AI neurochip. On the other hand, Togusa, the least cyberized of the Section 9 staff, holds a less idealist view: "they're just machines." Aside from leading to an indignant outburst from the Tachikomas (who accuse Togusa of bigotry), it sets up something of an antagonistic relationship between Togusa and the tanks, which is revisited in an episode in season two. Major Motoko Kusanagi holds the most pragmatic view of all. Her only regret following the Tachikomas' suicide attack is that she didn't get a chance to dive their AI, and discover whether or not what they had acquired was really a "ghost". In the manga, she expresses concern over the evolution of the Tachikomas' AI and orders it monitored to catch any undesired emotional developments or an unwanted "rise of the robots."

By the end of the series, the Tachikoma fleet start approaching sapience; all are sent back to the lab for dissection, amidst fears that they are no longer fit for combat duty. It is the use of natural oil in Batou's personal Tachikoma (all other units used synthetic lubricant) that acted as a catalyst for the behavioral anomalies that began to manifest as sapience. Major Kusanagi subsequently bans the use of natural oil prior to the later decision to halt deployment of Tachikomas in field ops.

Three Tachikoma survive the mandatory decommissioning, (one blue, calling itself "Batou's Personal Tachikoma", and two others, repainted yellow and silver) and prove their worth when they abandon their new civilian jobs to save their imperiled comrades, without explicit orders to do so. The silver Tachikoma is destroyed on sight after it rescues Batou from attack by an Armed Suit, a bipedal power-actuated armored exoskeleton. The blue and yellow Tachikoma combine their efforts to save him, and conduct a desperate and ultimately suicidal attack against the Umibozu, while Batou watches from a nearby terrace with a stricken look on his face. This selfless act is the last thing they ever do. Those sent to the lab for structural analysis were restored from backups, their AI given a slew of upgrades and loaded into a new fleet, which appears in the second season.

=== S.A.C. 2nd GIG ===
In the second season, S.A.C. 2nd GIG, the enforced synchronizations among Tachikomas are limited to essential data only. Motoko Kusanagi allows them to maintain their own personality after the events in the first season. They can still share information and sensation via synchronization should they choose to. The Tachikomas are also outfitted to perform complex networking tasks including net-diving to aid Section 9. Several episodes featured the Tachikomas operating in the net using a representational avatar, instead of their map symbol of a triangle in a circle. It is indicated that while operating within the net, they could not inhabit their physical units.

It is hinted that Tachikoma units developed ghosts. During the finale of 2nd GIG, while ordered to create a repository in cyberspace for the memories (and hopefully, ghosts) of all refugees of Dejima, they secured instead their own memories within the netspace and sacrificed their AI satellite to prevent a nuclear explosion. A fellow AI, the bioroid Proto, saw this and announced to the viewers that Tachikomas do indeed have ghosts.

=== Solid State Society ===
During the early portion of the film Solid State Society, the Uchikomas are seen being used by Section 9 in a way similar to the way the un-learned Tachikomas had been used. It was revealed that the engineers at Section 9 failed to reproduce the phenomenon whereby the AI develops an advanced state of self-awareness. However, the reappearance of the Major also brings the return of the Tachikomas. Initially they are seen in their cyberspace avatar forms, sporting different decals and individual names such as Max, Musashi, Loki, and Conan (names directly lifted from the Major's AI partners in the Man-Machine Interface manga). Eventually they are reintroduced to physical bodies, and rejoin Section 9 as full members.

=== Tachikomatic Days ===
Tachikomatic Days (タチコマな日々, Tachikoma na Hibi), also known as Tachikoma Specials or Tachikoma Days, are a series of shorts attached to the end of every episode of Ghost in the Shell: Stand Alone Complex. Each short takes features the antics of the Tachikoma think tanks of Section 9 and involves plot points from the episodes. Ghost in the Shell: S.A.C. 2nd GIG also has Tachikomatic Days at the end of each episode and most of the DVD and iTunes releases of both series.

Tachikomatic Days did not air on Cartoon Network's Adult Swim broadcast of Stand Alone Complex and 2nd GIG. However, they are shown on Adult Swim's free webcast programming service Adult Swim Video. On Australia's Cartoon Network's Adult Swim, the Tachikomatic Days shorts are broadcast with each episode. The UK's AnimeCentral broadcasts Tachikoma Days with each episode.

== Merchandise ==
Numerous Tachikoma merchandise items have been released by various companies, including a 1/24-scale plastic model kit released by Wave in December 2005, and a 1/35-scale model produced by Kotobukiya in 2014.
