= Laughing Man =

Laughing Man may refer to:

- "The Laughing Man" (short story), a 1949 short story by J.D. Salinger
- Laughing Man (Ghost in the Shell), a fictional character in the anime series Ghost in the Shell: Stand Alone Complex
- Der lachende Mann – Bekenntnisse eines Mörders (The Laughing Man – Confessions of a Murderer), a 1966 East German film
- Ghost in the Shell: S.A.C. - The Laughing Man, an OVA film based on the anime series
- The Man Who Laughs (L'homme qui rit) or The Laughing Man, a novel by Victor Hugo
- A foundation and coffeehouse founded by Hugh Jackman
