= Ghost in the Shell: SAC 2045 =

2020 Japanese-American animated webseries

- Ghost in the Shell: SAC_2045
- Japanese promotional poster

攻殻機動隊 SAC_2045 (Kōkaku Kidōtai Esu-Ē-Shī Nī-Zero-Yon-Go)
- Genre: Action, science fiction
- Created by: Masamune Shirow
- Original net animation
- Directed by: Kenji Kamiyama; Shinji Aramaki
- Produced by: Haruyasu Makino; Kengo Abe; Natsuko Tatsuzawa (season 1); Daichi Sasa (season 2)
- Written by: Kenji Kamiyama
- Music by: Kazuma Jinnōchi; Nobuko Toda
- Studio: Production I.G; Sola Digital Arts
- Licensed by: Netflix: UK/NA: Anime Limited
- Released: April 23, 2020 – May 23, 2022
- Runtime: 24 minutes
- Episodes: 24
- Anime film

Ghost in the Shell: SAC_2045 Sustainable War
- Directed by: Kenji Kamiyama (chief); Shinji Aramaki (chief); Michihito Fujii
- Written by: Kenji Kamiyama
- Music by: Kazuma Jinnōchi; Nobuko Toda
- Studio: Production I.G; Sola Digital Arts
- Licensed by: Netflix
- Released: November 12, 2021
- Runtime: 118 minutes
- Anime film

Ghost in the Shell: SAC_2045 The Last Human
- Directed by: Kenji Kamiyama (chief); Shinji Aramaki (chief); Michihito Fujii
- Written by: Kenji Kamiyama
- Music by: Kazuma Jinnōchi; Nobuko Toda
- Studio: Production I.G; Sola Digital Arts
- Released: November 23, 2023
- Runtime: 126 minutes

Ghost in the Shell: SAC_2045 (Japanese: 攻殻機動隊 SAC_2045, Hepburn: Kōkaku Kidōtai Esu-Ē-Shī Nī-Zero-Yon-Go) is a Japanese original net animation (ONA) series based on the 1989–91 manga series Ghost in the Shell by Masamune Shirow, set in the Stand Alone Complex sub-continuity.

The first season premiered exclusively on Netflix worldwide on April 23, 2020, followed by a second season that was released on May 23, 2022, with two compilation movies of the series being released in 2021 and 2023. Both seasons and their respective compilation movies received generally negative reviews, with critics considering the series inferior to previous Ghost in the Shell media due to multiple factors.

== Premise ==
In the year 2045 (11 years after events of Solid State Society), after an economic disaster known as the Simultaneous Global Default which destroyed the value of all forms of paper and electronic currency, the "Big 4" nations of the world are engaged in a state of never-ending "Sustainable War" to keep the economy going. In this world, Motoko, Batou, and other members of Public Security Section 9 have contracted themselves out as mercenaries under the group "GHOST", using their cybernetic enhancements and battle experience to earn a living while defusing hot-spots across the globe. However, the emergence of "Post Humans" and a conspiracy uncovered by former Chief Aramaki force Section 9 to reunite.

== Voice cast ==
Character	Japanese voice actor	English voice actor
Motoko Kusanagi	Atsuko Tanaka	Mary Elizabeth McGlynn
Daisuke Aramaki	Osamu Saka	William Knight
Batou	Akio Ōtsuka	Richard Epcar
Togusa	Kōichi Yamadera	Crispin Freeman
Ishikawa	Yutaka Nakano	Michael McCarty
Saito	Tōru Ōkawa	Dave Wittenberg
Paz	Takashi Onozuka	Bob Buchholz
Borma	Taro Yamaguchi	Dean Wein
Tachikoma	Sakiko Tamagawa	Melissa Fahn
Purin Esaki	Megumi Han	Cherami Leigh
Standard	Kenjiro Tsuda	Keith Silverstein
John Smith	Kaiji Soze	Roger Craig Smith
Chris Otomo Tate	Shigeo Kiyama	Armen Taylor
Takashi Shimamura	Megumi Hayashibara	Max Mittelman; Jeannie Tirado (young)
Phillip Kukushkin	Tarusuke Shingaki	Euguen Leon

== Production ==
Kodansha and Production I.G announced on April 7, 2017, that Kenji Kamiyama and Shinji Aramaki would be co-directing a new Ghost in the Shell anime production. On December 7, 2018, it was reported by Netflix that they had acquired the worldwide streaming rights to the original net animation (ONA) anime series, titled Ghost in the Shell: SAC_2045, and that it would premiere on April 23, 2020. The series is in 3DCG and Sola Digital Arts collaborated with Production I.G on the project. Ilya Kuvshinov handled character designs. An English dub was not available until May 3 due to the COVID-19 pandemic causing production delays for its recording. It was stated that the series will have two seasons of 12 episodes each, with the second set released on May 23, 2022.

In July 2021, it was announced that the first season would be adapted into a theatrical compilation film, subtitled Sustainable War, which premiered on November 12. Netflix released the film worldwide on May 9, 2022. A theatrical compilation film of the second season, The Last Human, was announced in March 2023, and premiered on November 23.

== Marketing ==
On May 22, 2024, official social media accounts of Hyundai Japan and Ghost in the Shell announced a collaboration to promote the Hyundai Ioniq 5 N. The Shibuya Tsutaya store hosted the Ioniq 5 N from June 3 to June 22.

== Reception ==
The anime received generally negative reviews from critics, with the first season garnering a 13% approval rating on review aggregator Rotten Tomatoes, while the second has a 29% approval rating.

Max Genecov of Polygon wrote that the series had "none of the visceral aesthetics or mood that made Ghost in the Shell an indelible element of how we think about our interconnected lives." Writing for The A.V. Club, Toussaint Egan rated the series a C−, calling the action sequences "awful" and opining that "as wonderful as it is to return to this series' interpretations of Major Kusanagi and company after more than a decade away, you'd be better off dusting off Stand Alone Complex DVDs and give this one a pass." Kayla Cobb of Decider wrote "time and time again SAC_2045 ignores the deeper path and chooses instead point and drool." Theron Martin of Anime News Network wrote that the series was "easily the weakest entry in the franchise so far, even below Ghost in the Shell 2: Innocence".
