= Ghost in the Shell (manga) =

Japanese manga series by Masamune Shirow

- First tankōbon volume cover, featuring Motoko Kusanagi

攻殻機動隊 (Kōkaku Kidōtai)
- Genre: Cyberpunk
- Manga
- Written by: Masamune Shirow
- Published by: Kodansha
- English publisher: NA: Studio Proteus (former); Dark Horse Comics (former); Kodansha USA; UK: Titan Books
- Imprint: Young Magazine KC
- Magazine: Young Magazine Zōkan Kaizokuban
- Original run: May 1989 – December 1990
- Volumes: 1
- Manga

1.5: Human Error Processor
- Written by: Masamune Shirow
- Published by: Kodansha
- English publisher: NA: Dark Horse Comics (former); Kodansha USA
- Magazine: Weekly Young Magazine
- Original run: 1991 – 1996
- Volumes: 1
- Manga

2: Man-Machine Interface
- Written by: Masamune Shirow
- Published by: Kodansha
- English publisher: NA: Dark Horse Comics (former); Kodansha USA; UK: Titan Books
- Magazine: Weekly Young Magazine
- Published: 1997
- Volumes: 1
- Manga

The Human Algorithm
- Written by: Junichi Fujisaku
- Illustrated by: Yuki Yoshimoto
- Published by: Kodansha
- English publisher: NA: Kodansha USA
- Magazine: Comic Days; Monthly Young Magazine (September 20, 2019 – November 18, 2021)
- Original run: September 16, 2019 – April 21, 2025
- Volumes: 8
- Related
- Feature films: Ghost in the Shell; Innocence; Ghost in the Shell: The New Movie; Ghost in the Shell (live action); Television series: Ghost in the Shell: Stand Alone Complex; S.A.C. 2nd GIG; Solid State Society; SAC_2045; Ghost in the Shell: Arise; Alternative Architecture; The Ghost in the Shell; Video game: Ghost in the Shell
- icon

Ghost in the Shell (Japanese: 攻殻機動隊, Hepburn: Kōkaku Kidōtai; lit. 'Assault Shell Mobile Squad') is a Japanese manga series written and illustrated by Masamune Shirow. It was first serialized in Kodansha's seinen manga magazine Young Magazine Zōkan Kaizokuban from 1989 to 1990, and was then compiled into a single tankōbon volume. Shirow produced two sequels: Ghost in the Shell 1.5: Human-Error Processor and Ghost in the Shell 2: Man-Machine Interface. Set in the mid-21st century, the manga tells the story of the fictional counter-cyberterrorist organization Public Security Section 9, led by protagonist Major Motoko Kusanagi.

The manga contain Shirow's thoughts on design and philosophy, including sociological issues, the consequences of technological advances and themes on the nature of consciousness and identity. Several artbooks have been released to detail the concept art and the world of Ghost in the Shell.

All three volumes have received mainly positive reviews. The manga spawned a media franchise of the same name, starting with the 1995 anime feature film Ghost in the Shell. Starting in 2019, a collaborative manga by Junichi Fujisaku (writer) and Yuki Yoshimoto (illustrator), titled Ghost in the Shell: The Human Algorithm, was made as the sequel to GiTS 1.5.

== Synopsis ==
=== Setting ===
Primarily set in the mid-21st century in the fictional Japanese city of Niihama, Niihama Prefecture, (Note: 新浜県新浜市, Niihama-ken Niihama-shi) (Note: The real world Niihama is located in Ehime Prefecture, and its name is written differently in Japanese.) otherwise known as New Port City, (Note: ニューポートシティ, Nyū Pōto Shiti) the manga and the many anime adaptations follow the members of Public Security Section 9, a special-operations task-force made up of former military officers and police detectives. Political intrigue and counter-terrorism operations are standard fare for Section 9, but the various actions of corrupt officials, companies, and cyber-criminals in each scenario are unique and require the diverse skills of Section 9's staff to prevent a series of incidents from escalating.

In this cyberpunk iteration of a possible future, computer technology has advanced to the point that many members of the public possess cyberbrains, technology that allows them to interface their biological brain with various networks. The level of cyberization varies from simple minimal interfaces to almost complete replacement of the brain with cybernetic parts, in cases of severe trauma. This can also be combined with various levels of prostheses, with a fully prosthetic body enabling a person to become a cyborg. The heroine of Ghost in the Shell, Major Motoko Kusanagi, is such a cyborg, having had a terrible accident befall her as a child that ultimately required that she use a full-body prosthesis to house her cyberbrain. This high level of cyberization, however, opens the brain up to attacks from highly skilled hackers, with the most dangerous being those who will hack a person to bend to their whims.

=== Story ===
Ghost in the Shell (Note: 攻殻機動隊 THE GHOST IN THE SHELL, Kōkaku Kidōtai Za Gōsuto in za Sheru; lit. 'Mobile Armored Riot Police: The Ghost in the Shell') begins in 2029, and features Section 9, led by Chief Daisuke Aramaki and Major Motoko Kusanagi, as they investigate the Puppeteer, a cyber-criminal wanted for committing a large number of crimes by proxy through "ghost hacking" humans with cyberbrains. As the investigation continues, Section 9 discovers that the Puppet Master is actually an advanced artificial intelligence created by a department of the Japanese government, taking up residence in a robot body. After destroying the latest host of the Puppeteer, Section 9 believes all is well, until the Major discovers the Puppet Master in her own mind. After hearing the Puppeteer's wishes to reach its next step in evolution, Kusanagi allows it to become one with her own ghost.

In Ghost in the Shell 1.5: Human-Error Processor (Note: 攻殻機動隊1.5 HUMAN-ERROR PROCESSER, Kōkaku Kidōtai Itten Go Hyūman Erā Purosessā; lit. 'Mobile Armored Riot Police: Human-Error Processer [sic]') the Major leaves Section 9 to work as a private contractor, with the remaining members of the unit, Batou, Togusa, Ishikawa, Saito, Paz, Borma, and Azuma, continuing their work as covert operatives, occasionally meeting up with the Major only in the chapter "Drive Slave".

Ghost in the Shell 2: Man-Machine Interface (Note: 攻殻機動隊2 MANMACHINE INTERFACE, Kōkaku Kidōtai Ni Manmashīn Intāfēsu; lit. 'Mobile Armored Riot Police: Manmachine [sic] Interface') is set four years and five months after Motoko Kusanagi fused with a sentient life form and left Public Security Section 9. The fused being of Motoko and the Puppeteer have been traveling the sea of the Net, merging with other ghosts and creating isotopes. Among them, Motoko Aramaki, the head of the Investigative Division at Poseidon Industrial, began investigating an incident involving an attack on a pig clone organ cultivation facility owned by its subsidiary, Meditech. As she delved into the investigation, she found herself making contact with other isotopes when infiltrating Motoko Kusanagi in a secretive club known as the "Sleeping Universe", a facility used for the transfer of consciousness.

== Production ==
=== Creation and development ===
While writing the manga, Masamune Shirow struggled to make it neither too complex nor too simple. Two official names exist for the works, the first is Kōkaku Kidōtai (攻殻機動隊, officially "Armored Shell"; literally "Mobile Armored Riot Police") and the second is "Ghost in the Shell". Masamune Shirow originally wanted to use the name "Ghost in the Shell" for the publication, as an homage to Arthur Koestler's The Ghost in the Machine, from which he drew inspiration. Kōichi Yuri, First Coordinator at Young Magazine, requested a "more flashy" name and Shirow came up with Kōkaku Kidōtai (攻殻機動隊, Shell Squad). Shirow requested that "Ghost in the Shell" be included on the title even if it was in small print. Yuri believes that Kōkaku Kidōtai is the mainstream title while "Ghost in the Shell" is the theme. While most Japanese publications use both names, the original publication in Young Magazine used Kōkaku Kidōtai.

When developing Ghost in the Shell 2: Man-Machine Interface, Shirow initially wanted to use a new title by changing the last kanji character meaning "military unit" (隊, tai), to the homophonic kanji for "body" (体, tai) so that it would literally translate "Mobile Unit Body Entity" (攻殻機動体, Kōkaku Kidōtai), but eventually he decided not to do so. The production of Ghost in the Shell 2: Man-Machine Interface manga was done digitally, which was difficult for Shirow because of troubles including a hard disk failure which resulted in the loss of 16 gigabytes of data, USB hardware troubles and reading manuals related to new application upgrades. Shirow considers the manga a completely different kind of work and not a true sequel of Ghost in the Shell. The original manga revolved around Public Security Section 9 and Ghost in the Shell 2: Man-Machine Interface follows what happens to the Major after she merges with the Puppeteer. Shirow drew the color pages on computer, in which he states was difficult to do due to technical issues with his computer.

=== Design and philosophy ===
Shirow's thoughts and work on Ghost in the Shell contain numerous footnotes and detailed explanations about scenes to give readers an understanding of the sociological differences or technological advances and philosophical discussion of the material. Examples include concepts like the future of hacking techniques, in which a cyberbrain can be hacked to copy information without being detected. Shirow explains instances of spirit channeling in cyborgs with kiko energy. Shirow even wrote that this phenomenon may be related to the "hearing voices" in individuals that suffer from mental disabilities like schizophrenia. This belief is represented in Motoko's reasons for head hunting Togusa for Section 9. Shirow also notes that he believes these channelers do not speak with a human-like god, but instead tap into a phase of the universe which synchronizes with the channeler's functions. Other philosophical stances are represented such as Shirow's personal beliefs regarding death sentences and crime and punishment.

Shirow explains numerous facets of the daily life throughout his notes in Ghost in the Shell. Cyborgs are shown consuming food, but Shirow noted that early in the development would have been pills or paste substance that would have both psychological and physical functions. The Fuchikoma robots also must consume in a sense, requiring replenishment of fluid for their neurochips every two months, but Fuchikoma are not entirely bio-robots. Shirow discussed in his notes how the family of Yano received notification of his death and what would be disclosed, but also notes strategic use and premature notifications exist for various purposes. The advancement of technology in Shirow's vision of the future is rapid, but the advancements are at least partially related to then-current technology. The concepts of a 3-D viewing room were based on "crude" golf simulator technology.

Other personal beliefs of Shirow are represented in the scenes and author's commentary, such as metaphysics, religious references, and other philosophical stances that enter a range of topics including his thoughts on a rotating universe.

=== Censorship ===
The removal of a two-page lesbian sex scene in Studio Proteus's localization of Ghost in the Shell was not well received, with readers reacting negatively to the removal of the previously uncensored content that was included in the original Dark Horse release. Toren Smith commented on Studio Proteus's actions claiming that requirement of the "mature readers only" would translate into a 40% loss in sales and likely have caused the immediate cancellation of the series. Shirow, who grew tired of "taking flak" over the pages, opted to remove them and reworked the previous page as necessary.

Ghost in the Shell 2: Man-Machine Interface also features an explicit two-page sex scene and increased nudity only found in the "Short Cut" version, originally released as part of the 2000 Solid Box. All of this erotic material was excised by Shirow himself from the 2001 tankōbon and later releases, which he considers his "final cut".

== Publication ==
Ghost in the Shell ran in the Kodansha's manga anthology Young Magazine Kaizokuban from the May 1989 to the December 1990 issues, and was released in tankōbon format on October 2, 1991. Dark Horse initially published it in English monthly into eight comic issues from March 1, 1995, to October 1, 1995, with the translation of Studio Proteus. It was collected into a trade paperback volume on December 1, 1995. An uncensored version was released by Dark Horse Comics on October 6, 2004. The censored version was later republished by Kodansha Comics in 2009 and 2017.

Masamune Shirow penned the sequel Ghost in the Shell 2: Man-Machine Interface and ran in Weekly Young Magazine in 1997. The chapters were collected into a hardcover volume along with its predecessor in a limited-edition box set titled Kōkaku Kidōtai Solid Box (Note: 攻殻機動隊SOLID BOX) on December 1, 2000. The box set also contained a booklet titled ManMachine Interface Inactive Module, a poster, and a Fuchikoma robot action figure. The Solid Box version added over 140 pages of new content. The tankōbon version was released on June 26, 2001, and included more changes, such as 24 color pages and over 20 large modifications to existing pages. The manga was then distributed in English by Dark Horse Comics in 11 comic issues from January 29, 2003, to December 31, 2003. Masamune Shirow manually redrew the manga for the English version so that it could be read from left to right. It was collected into a single volume in trade paperback on January 12, 2005. The manga was republished by Kodansha Comics on August 10, 2010.

Four chapters from the sequel's run that were published from 1991 to 1996 and not released in tankōbon format in previous releases were later collected into a single volume titled Ghost in the Shell 1.5: Human-Error Processor. The manga was published on July 17, 2003, by Kodansha. It included a booklet and a CD-ROM featuring the full stories, adding music to the manga scenes, and a screen saver. Dark Horse Comics announced an English version at the 2005 San Diego Comic-Con. The four chapters were each split into two, and released as eight individual comic issues from November 1, 2006, to June 6, 2007, and was the first of the Ghost in the Shell manga released in the United States to read right-to-left. Dark Horse Comics later released it in a single trade paperback volume on October 10, 2007. The manga was later republished by Kodansha Comics on September 25, 2012.

A box set containing the three manga volumes in hardcover and a lithograph by Masamune Shirow was released by Kodansha Comics on December 19, 2017, titled The Ghost in the Shell Deluxe Complete Box Set. Kodansha Comics also compiled the three manga as a single hardcover volume with a new cover art by Masamune Shirow on January 10, 2023, titled The Ghost in the Shell: Fully Compiled.

A sequel to 1.5, written by Junichi Fujisaku and illustrated by Yuki Yoshimoto, titled Ghost in the Shell: The Human Algorithm, started in Kodansha's Comic Days digital platform on September 16, 2019; the manga was also published in Monthly Young Magazine from September 20, 2019, to November 18, 2021. The series ended on April 21, 2025, and its chapters were collected in eight volumes. In North America, it is published under Kodansha Comics.

No.	Title	Original release date	English release date
1	Ghost in the Shell; Kōkaku Kidōtai Za Gōsuto in za Sheru (攻殻機動隊 THE GHOST IN THE SHELL)	October 2, 1991; 4-06-313248-X	December 1, 1995; 1-56971-081-3
01 "Prologue"; 02 "Super Spartan" 10.4.2029; 03 "Junk Jungle" 27.7.2029; 04 "Megatech Machine 1 – Revolt of the Robots"; 05 "Megatech Machine 2 – The Making of a Cyborg"; 06 "Robot Rondo" 1.10.2029; 07 "Phantom Fund" 24.12.2029; 08 "Dumb Barter" 2.5.2030; 09 "Bye Bye Clay" 15.7.2030; 10 "Brain Drain" 9.9.2030; 11 "Ghost Coast" 18.9.2030; 12 "Epilogue"
In 2029 Public Security Section 9 led by Major Motoko Kusanagi hunts down the Puppet Master, a cyber-criminal wanted for committing a large number of crimes by proxy through "ghost hacking" humans with cyberbrains. The investigation soon discovers that the Puppet Master is actually an advanced artificial intelligence project developed by Section 6, the Treaty Bureau of the Ministry of Foreign Affairs. After subduing the Puppet Master's robot host and destroying it, they believe the Puppet Master is gone, but the Major believes otherwise, and is proven right when she discovers the Puppet Master in her own cyberbrain. The Puppet Master wishes to seek its next step in evolution, and Kusanagi allows it to merge with her ghost.
1.5	Ghost in the Shell 1.5: Human-Error Processor; Kōkaku Kidōtai Itten Go Hyūman Erā Purosessā (攻殻機動隊1.5 HUMAN-ERROR PROCESSER)	July 23, 2003; 978-4-06-350406-4	October 10, 2007; 978-1-59307-815-7
01 "Fat Cat" part 1 (1991); 02 "Fat Cat" part 2 (1991); 03 "Drive Slave" part 1 (1992); 04 "Drive Slave" part 2 (1992); 05 "Mines of Mind" part 1 (1995); 06 "Mines of Mind" part 2 (1995); 07 "Lost Past" (1996)
This volume chronicles four cases Section 9 investigates between volumes 1 and 2. In "Fat Cat", the team investigates a man's recent strange activities at the behest of his daughter, one of Chief Daisuke Aramaki's friends. In "Drive Slave", Section 9 protects a key witness in a court case from various cyborg assassins sent to kill him, while Major Kusanagi arrives, having been sent to capture the man responsible for the assassins. The story "Mines of the Mind" features Batou and Togusa investigating a series of murders, with all the victims marked with the same tattoo. In "Lost Past", the investigation into a kidnapping gone wrong has Section 9 suspecting that Section 6 hired a sniper to make it go wrong in the first place.
2	Ghost in the Shell 2: Man-Machine Interface; Kōkaku Kidōtai Ni Manmashīn Intāfēsu (攻殻機動隊2 MANMACHINE INTERFACE)	June 26, 2001; 4-06-336310-4	January 12, 2005; 1-59307-204-X
01 "Prologue" 2035.03.06.AM05:05; 02 "Underwater" 2035.03.06.AM05:45; 03 "Circuit Weapon" 2035.03.06.PM01:12; 04 "Fly by Orbit" 2035.03.06.PM01:12; 05 "Mold of Life" 2035.03.06.PM01:54; 06 "Epilogue" 2035.03.06.05:35AM
This story is set four years and five months after Motoko Kusanagi fused with a sentient life form and left Public Security Section 9. The fused being of Motoko and the Puppeteer have been traveling the sea of the Net, merging with other ghosts and creating isotopes. Among them, Motoko Aramaki, the head of the Investigative Division at Poseidon Industrial, began investigating an incident involving an attack on a pig clone organ cultivation facility owned by its subsidiary, Meditech. As she delved into the investigation, she found herself making contact with other isotopes when infiltrating Motoko Kusanagi in a secretive club known as the "Sleeping Universe", a facility used for the transfer of consciousness.

== Related media ==
A number of artbooks detailing the concept art and world of Ghost in the Shell have been released. A box set titled Kōkaku Kidōtai Cyberdelics (Note: 攻殻機動隊Cyberdelics) was released on July 8, 1997. The box set contains a collection of posters illustrated by Masamune Shirow, a booklet and a puzzle. A guidebook titled The Ghost in the Shell: Mechanical Analysis Reader (Note: 攻殻機動隊メカニカル解析読本, Kōkaku Kidōtai Mekanikaru Kaiseki Dokuhon) was published by Kodansha and released on January 16, 1998. An art book titled The Ghost in the Shell: Fuchikoma Papercraft (Note: 攻殻機動隊フチコマ立体図鑑, Kōkaku Kidōtai fuchikoma Rittai Zukan) was released by Kodansha on July 24, 2000. The book contains several different artwork and paper cut out figures of the Fuchikoma.

The Ghost in the Shell video game was developed by Exact and released for the PlayStation on July 17, 1997, in Japan by Sony Computer Entertainment. It is a third-person shooter featuring an original storyline where the character plays a rookie member of Section 9.

A VR Noh stage play adaptation was presented in Tokyo's Setagaya Public Theatre on August 22 and 23, 2020, and has since also been performed in Fukuoka and Sapporo.

Pandora in the Crimson Shell: Ghost Urn, a manga series based on a concept by Shirow, with his editorial contributions in every tankōbon volume, and written and illustrated by Kōshi Rikudō, was published from 2012 to 2024. The series was conceived as an effort to officially merge the already connected universes of Appleseed and Ghost in the Shell, with the long-stalled Glitch Witch envisioned as the second half of that story.

Glitch Witch, written and character-designed by Shirow, with art by Naoki Azuma, began publication on Young Magazine Web in 2026 and continues the overarching P2501 plot as a parallel work to Ghost in the Shell, set in the United States in 2029.

=== Film and television ===
Animation studio Production I.G has produced several different anime adaptations of Ghost in the Shell, starting with the 1995 film of the same name, telling the story of Section 9's investigation of the Puppet Master. The film was followed by a sequel titled Ghost in the Shell 2: Innocence, released in 2004.

Meanwhile, a television series release began in 2002 under the title Ghost in the Shell: Stand Alone Complex, telling an alternate story from the manga and first film, featuring Section 9's investigations of government corruption in the Laughing Man and Individual Eleven incidents. The series ran for two seasons of 26 episodes each, with the second season titled Ghost in the Shell: S.A.C. 2nd GIG. In 2006 a sequel film to the S.A.C. series was produced as Ghost in the Shell: Stand Alone Complex – Solid State Society. A Netflix continuation, Ghost in the Shell: SAC_2045, ran for two seasons of twelve episodes each in 2020 and 2022.

2013 saw the start of the Ghost in the Shell: Arise OVA series, an alternate-universe origin story set in 2027 and consisting of four parts released through mid-2014. The series was recompiled in early 2015 as a television series titled Ghost in the Shell: Arise – Alternative Architecture, airing with an additional two episodes (one part). An animated feature film produced by most of the Arise staff, titled Ghost in the Shell: The New Movie, was released on June 20, 2015.

A live-action American-produced adaptation starring Scarlett Johansson as The Major was released in the United States on March 31, 2017, by Paramount Pictures.

An anime television series by Science Saru, directly adapting the first volume of the manga, aired in 2026 for ten episodes.

== Reception ==
Ghost in the Shell has received mainly positive reviews. Publishers Weekly praised the manga for its artwork: "Masamune's b&w drawings are dynamic and beautifully gestural; he vividly renders the awesome urban landscape of a futuristic, supertechnological Japan." Leroy Douresseaux of the website ComicBookBin gave the manga an "A" stating: "It is visually potent and often inscrutable, but its sense of wonder and exploration makes its ideas still seem fresh two decades after its debut." Peter Gutiérrez of the website Graphic Novel Reporter praised the manga, writing: "In short, Ghost in the Shell is hard sci-fi of the best possible sort: the type that's so full of both undiluted artfulness and philosophy that it's arguably a must-read even for those who don't usually take to the genre." Greg McElhatton of Read About Comics praised the artwork, however criticized the manga for its story pacing and collection of short adventures stating, "I'm glad I got to experience Shirow's artistic view of the future and am a little interested in the idea of his Intron Depot art books, but on the whole Ghost in the Shell was a massive shell game: flashy and fascinating from a glance, but ultimately empty when you decide to dive in."

Ghost in the Shell 2: Man-Machine Interface has sold over 100,000 copies from its initial printing in Japan. Diamond Comic Distributors ranked the manga #7 in its Top Performing Manga list of 2005. Mike Crandol of Anime News Network criticized the manga for being too complex and overwhelming stating it is "too technical for its own good" but praised the new artwork, stating that Shirow's "canny drawing skills are supplemented by an innovative use of CGI graphics that represent the series' boldest artistic endeavor." Publishers Weekly praised the artwork as "the color and b&w graphics are stunning, brilliantly evoking the nonvisual world of data transmission" but stated that the story can be confusing.

Ghost in the Shell 1.5: Human-Error Processor was ranked #10 in The New York Times Manga Best Seller List on October 19, 2012. Scott Green of Ain't It Cool News praised the manga for its footnotes that "alone are worth the price of admission. The degree to which he apparently takes every aspect seriously and the amount of information he'd like to convey verges on a disorder."
