= Kuze =

Kuze may refer to:

- Daisaku Kuze, one of the secondary antagonists in the video game Yakuza 0
- Hideo Kuze, a cyborg in the anime Ghost in the Shell: S.A.C. 2nd GIG
- Kuze, a student in the Kanon series
- Kuze, a sub-location of Old Town in Mombasa, Kenya
