= Mimi Woods =

American voice actress

Mimi J. Woods (born October 18, 1965) is a former Los Angeles–based voice actress known primarily for voice-overs in Japanese anime. She is best known for being the English voice of Motoko Kusanagi in the original Ghost in the Shell film and video game. She was also credited as Mimi J. Davies and M.J. Davis.

She has long since retired from acting. According to Mary Elizabeth McGlynn (the voice of Kusanagi in the Ghost in the Shell: Stand Alone Complex series), Woods had moved away from Los Angeles. The last voiceover role she was featured in was the English version of the video game The Bouncer, in which she voiced a television news anchor named after herself in the game's opening cinematic.

== Dubbing roles ==
=== Animated film and series English dubbing ===
- Battle Athletes Victory – Lahrri Fernando
- Black Magic M-66 – Nakamura
- El Hazard series – Shayla-Shayla
- Ghost in the Shell – Motoko Kusanagi
- Moldiver – Agt. Jennifer
- Outlanders – Battia (L.A. Hero dub)
- Phantom Quest Corp. – Ruriko Asakaga
- Super Dimension Fortress Macross II: Lovers, Again – Natasha
- The Guyver: Bio-Booster Armor – Anchorwoman
- The Super Dimension Century Orguss – Ripple, Athena

=== Video games English dubbing ===
- The Bouncer – Newscaster
- Ghost in the Shell – Motoko Kusanagi
