= Ghost in the Shell (video game) =

1997 video game

- Japanese box art featuring Motoko Kusanagi
- Developer: Exact (Note: Animation produced by Production I.G. Additional work by Sony Computer Entertainment Japan.)
- Publishers: WW: Sony Computer Entertainment; NA: THQ
- Director: Kenji Sawaguchi
- Producer: Tetsuji Yamamoto
- Designer: Hiroyuki Saegusa
- Programmer: Hiroshi Yamamoto
- Artists: Masamune Shirow; Kazuhiro Kinoshita
- Writer: Keiichi Mikihara
- Series: Ghost in the Shell
- Platform: PlayStation
- Release: JP: July 17, 1997; NA: December 2, 1997; EU: July 1, 1998
- Genres: Action, third-person shooter
- Mode: Single-player

Ghost in the Shell (Note: Japanese: 攻殻機動隊 GHOST IN THE SHELL, Hepburn: Kōkaku Kidōtai GHOST IN THE SHELL; "Mobile Armored Riot Police—Ghost in the Shell") is a 1997 third-person shooter video game developed by Exact in collaboration with Production I.G. and published by Sony Computer Entertainment for the PlayStation. A part of the larger Ghost in the Shell media franchise, the game was released in July 1997 in Japan, December 1997 by THQ in North America and July 1998 in Europe. Soundtrack albums, an artbook and a guidebook were produced to accompany the game.

Masamune Shirow, the author of the original manga, provided character and mecha designs, which are presented in the official artbook published by Kodansha. Ghost in the Shell's plot revolves around a recruit of Public Security Section 9 as he investigates and combats the Human Liberation Front. The player controls a Fuchikoma, a robotic fighting vehicle capable of traversing walls and ceilings. The English version of the game uses the same voice cast as the English dub of the 1995 feature film of the same name, although the two works are not in the same continuity, as the game takes its tone and setting from the first volume of the manga.

The game received mainly positive reviews. It was praised for its graphics, animation, music and unusual wall-climbing mechanics. However, it received criticism for its tedious and repetitive gameplay and low difficulty. Fifteen years after its release, Game Informer listed Ghost in the Shell as one of the best manga and anime-based games.

== Gameplay ==
The player's Fuchikoma robot scaling a skyscraper and attacking an enemy

The player controls a spider-shaped think tank robot, known as Fuchikoma, that is able to jump, thrust forward, strafe to the side, climb walls, and hang upside-down from ceilings. The camera auto-adjusts its position when scaling walls and ceilings for easy maneuvering, and automatically switches between first and third-person perspectives depending on the environment, although the player can stay in first-person view at will.

The Fuchikoma is equipped with twin machine guns and guided missiles. Both weapons have unlimited ammunition, however up to six missiles can be launched at once after a charge time. Grenades can be found throughout missions and a maximum of three can be carried at a time. Enemies vary from humanoid robots to helicopters and sport an array of firearms and explosives. Some stages of the game are governed by a time limit. Seventeen cutscenes can be unlocked throughout the missions and depending on the player's score in training mode. Once unlocked, the cutscenes can be reviewed on the options menu.

The training mode contains six stages to learn the basic game elements. The first five stages introduce the player to targets in various settings and using the controls effectively, with the sixth being a battle against another Fuchikoma. The twelve missions that compose the story take place in different environments, including a warehouse complex, a sewer, the city highways, and the enemy base inside of a skyscraper. The missions display a variety of gameplay objectives: the first mission is a raid; the third level is an Explosive Ordnance Disposal mission that involves the elimination of bombs attached to red barrels; the fourth level is a sea chase on a boat; the fifth level is a game of hide-and-seek with the player having to locate a boss wearing thermoptical camouflage; and the game's final boss fight ends with a free fall battle down the skyscraper under a timer.

== Plot ==
The plot follows the members of Public Security Section 9, mainly consisting of Major Motoko Kusanagi, Chief Aramaki, Batou, Togusa, Ishikawa, Saito, and a nameless male, the Rookie, controlled by the player. The game's story is told using mission briefings and animated cutscenes.

After the terrorist organization known as the Human Liberation Front claims responsibility for blowing up the Megatech Body Corporation building, Section 9 is sent to resolve the situation. Section 9 is able to trace the terrorists' communications and find their location in the bay area; however, it is a trap. Chief Aramaki later announces that the leader of the Human Liberation Front is a mercenary known as Zebra 27. Ishikawa then reports that the Energy Ministry is interested in files relating to Zebra; Aramaki orders further investigation.

The Rookie's skill is put to the test, leading chase missions and surviving an ambush. Eventually, the Human Liberation Front's secret base is discovered in Aeropolis II tower by following the enemy supply line, along with the terrorists' intentions of using a nuclear reactor. Ishikawa informs Aramaki that an official of the Energy Ministry named Sawamura has been in contact with Zebra and is connected to Megatech Body Corporation. While conducting the raid on the enemy's base, the reactor begins to overload. In order to shut it down, squad leader Motoko Kusanagi attempts to remove the protective barrier from an access point nearby, as the rest of the team search for the other building's control room. After disarming the reactor, Kusanagi locates the leader on top of the tower. Batou and Togusa encounter obstacles that prevent them from moving to the top, leaving the Rookie as the only available member. Once he reaches the top, he engages the leader in combat and defeats him in a free fall battle off of the tower.

After the mission, it is revealed that Sawamura planned to collect bribes from Megatech in exchange for covering up a defect in the nuclear reactor, which was going to explode, and presenting it as a terrorist attack; however, Zebra seized the reactor to take it over and wanted to extort money from Sawamura. Kusanagi declares the entire experience as at least good training for the Rookie and acknowledges the Rookie's cleverness, but criticizes the overdependence on the Fuchikoma.

== Development ==
The game was in development for one and a half years, and involved the work of several divisions, with Kenji Sawaguchi and Tetsuji Yamamoto as director and producer respectively. Exact, best known for the Jumping Flash! series, handled programming. Ghost in the Shell was designed and targeted to a mature audience; developers did not make Motoko playable to prevent the game appearing to be a character-based game for children. The original manga's creator Masamune Shirow was the main designer of the characters and mecha for the game.

Animation was produced at Production I.G; Hiroyuki Kitakubo, who had previously worked with Masamune Shirow on the 1987 OVA adaptation of Black Magic, directed the animation sequences; military science fiction novelist Keiichi Mikihara wrote the game's story; Toshihiro Kawamoto was animation supervisor and a character designer. The scenes are noticeably different when compared to the film namesake directed by Mamoru Oshii, because the game is colored using a full digital technique. The scenes are a combination of traditional animation and backgrounds that were rendered in three dimensions to ensure smooth transitions for the camera movement. Adobe Photoshop was used to add the finishing details to the scenes.

The Japanese voicing of the game was done by a different cast than the film's: Motoko Kusanagi was played by Hiromi Tsuru, Batou by Shinji Ogawa, Chief Aramaki by Soichi Ito, Ishikawa by Kiyoshi Kobayashi, Togusa by Hirotaka Suzuoki, Saito by Nobuyuki Hiyama, and the Fuchikoma were voiced by Katsue Miwa. The English localization was dubbed by the same cast used for the original movie, although the game does not specify the respective roles in the credits. Motoko was voiced by Mimi Woods, Batou by Richard Epcar, Aramaki by William Frederick, and Togusa by Christopher Joyce; the roles of Bob Papenbrook, Wendee Lee, Jimmy Krakor and Julie Maddalena are not reliably known.

== Release and promotion ==
The game was originally released in Japan by Sony Computer Entertainment on July 17, 1997. The following day, a launch party was held at the Yebisu Garden Hall: the Megatech Body Night. The event featured the game's music artists Takkyu Ishino, Joey Beltram and Mijk van Dijk performing live, and a Fuchikoma robot appeared. All who bought tickets received a papercraft kit of the Fuchikoma and ten posters of the game were raffled. A Japanese demo disc was also released with the first mission playable.

The first edition of Official U.S. PlayStation Magazine was published in October 1997 and featured the game on its cover. Having acquired the North American license to publish Ghost in the Shell video games in mid-1996, THQ released the game in North America on December 2, 1997. It was released in Europe by Sony Computer Entertainment on July 1, 1998. THQ's producer Don Nauert said that aside from dubbing and changing the button configuration, the English localization of the game was not modified nor censored.

=== Soundtrack ===
Ghost in the Shell: Megatech Body

Soundtrack album by various artists
- Released: July 17, 1997
- Genres: Video game music, techno
- Length: Megatech Body CD. 63:30; Megatech Body CD., Ltd. 124:09
- Label: Sony Music Entertainment Japan
- Producer: Takkyu Ishino

The soundtrack albums for the game were titled Ghost in the Shell: Megatech Body (Note: 攻殻機動隊有機肉威感, Kōkaku Kidōtai Yūki Niku I Kan), named after the cybernetic body manufacturer in the Ghost in the Shell series. The albums were produced by Takkyu Ishino and feature techno tracks by other composers including Mijk van Dijk. Two versions of the albums were released by Sony Music Entertainment Japan on July 17, 1997: Megatech Body CD., a standard single disc; and Megatech Body CD., Ltd., a limited two-disc edition. Megatech Vinyl. Ltd. was a limited two LP record set scheduled to be released.

==== Track listing ====
Disc 1
No.	Title	Writer(s)	Length
1.	"Ghost in the Shell"	Takkyu Ishino	6:44
2.	"Firecracker"	Mijk van Dijk	5:25
3.	"Ishikawa Surfs The System"	Brother From Another Planet	3:58
4.	"Spook & Spell (Fast Version)"	Hardfloor	5:53
5.	"Featherhall"	Westbam	6:42
6.	"The Vertical"	Joey Beltram	6:28
7.	"Blinding Waves"	Scan X	4:44
8.	"The Searcher Part II"	The Advent	3:27
9.	"Spectre"	BCJ	5:46
10.	"Can U Dig It"	Dave Angel	7:17
11.	"To Be or Not To Be (Off the Cuff Mix)"	Derrick May	7:01
Total length:			63:30

Disc 2 (Ltd.)
No.	Title	Writer(s)	Length
1.	"Fuchi Koma"	Mijk van Dijk	5:09
2.	"Down Loader"	The Advent	6:19
3.	"Thanato"	BCJ	3:27
4.	"Moonriver"	Westbam	8:09
5.	"Brain Dive"	Mijk van Dijk	4:48
6.	"Spook & Spell (Slow Version)"	Hardfloor	6:30
7.	"Die Dunkelsequenz"	Westbam	7:33
8.	"Section 9 Theme"	Brother From Another Planet	6:01
9.	"So High"	Dave Angel	5:35
10.	"To Be or Not To Be (The Mix of a Mix Mix)"	Derrick May	7:03
Total length:			60:39

=== Related media ===
Kodansha released three books and one video about the game. Ghost in the Shell Official Art Book (Note: 攻殻機動隊 OFFICIAL ART BOOK, Kōkaku Kidōtai OFFICIAL ART BOOK) was published on July 4, 1997; the artbook contains concept designs, scenes and commentary. Two guidebooks were published: Ghost in the Shell: Basic File (Note: 攻殻機動隊 GHOST IN THE SHELL 上巻 ベーシックファイル, Kōkaku Kidōtai GHOST IN THE SHELL Jōkan Bēshikku Fairu) on July 17, 1997, and Ghost in the Shell: Master File (Note: 攻殻機動隊 GHOST IN THE SHELL 下巻 マスターファイル, Kōkaku Kidōtai GHOST IN THE SHELL Gekan Masutā Fairu) on August 29, 1997. The video, Making of Game Ghost in the Shell All of Digital Animation (Note: MAKING OF GAME 攻殻機動隊デジタルアニメーションのすべて, MAKING OF GAME Kōkaku Kidōtai Dejitaru Animēshon no Subete), features interviews with the animation staff; it was released on VHS on April 22, 1998. A LaserDisc was also released in 1998 that included interviews on side A and the in-game cutscenes on side B.

== Reception ==
Reception

Aggregate score
Aggregator	Score
GameRankings	79%

Review scores
Publication	Score
AllGame	4/5
Computer and Video Games	3/5
Edge	7/10
Electronic Gaming Monthly	7.5/10, 7.5/10, 7.5/10, 6.5/10
Famitsu	6/10, 5/10, 6/10, 6/10
GameFan	88/100, 88/100, 86/100
GameSpot	7.3/10
Hyper	88%
IGN	8/10
Next Generation	3/5
Super Game Power	4/5
Dengeki PlayStation	60/100, 70/100
NowGamer	7.3/10
Velikij Drakon	5/5

Ghost in the Shell gained an aggregate rating of 78.50% at GameRankings based on six reviews. AllGame praised the graphics, sound and gameplay; the review stated, "Even with plenty of eye candy and strong audio, a game is nothing without actually being fun to play and as you've probably guessed, Ghost in the Shell supplies the fun, whether you're familiar with the license or not." GameSpot rated the game as good, eulogizing the controls as "simple... most people will take to them like a fish to water" and praising the animation sequences. GameFan reviewers cited the game's unique wall-scaling mechanics and stated that it lives up to the name of the Ghost in the Shell series. IGN said that the game was great, faithful to its manga counterpart, stating that "the techno music, including tracks from artists like Derrick May and Hardfloor, is superb," but adding that "the levels aren't incredibly difficult, and don't really encourage replay." Super GamePower reviewed the game shortly after the movie was released in Brazil, stating that the opening animation was better than the animation in the film. In Russia, Velikij Drakon lauded the orientation system, the game graphics and the overall design, highlighting the unlockable animation scenes. NowGamer praised the gameplay mechanics but criticized the option to unlock, stating, "The tremendous feeling of agility you get from Ghost In The Shell and the slick weapons is where the fun comes from. But it's a tough game and playing for more scenes of new footage will not be compelling enough for a country in which anime is a cult industry and not a national fixation."

GamePro did not find the game worthy of its name, although the cutscenes were praised, stating, "The cinemas at the opening of the game and between each level are stunning; however, the game graphics, particularly buildings and enemies, are lackluster at best. The sound effects are bland, and there are no weapon power-ups to be found. Put that all together and you get a very generic game." Next Generation said it is an enjoyable game but eventually begins to feel tedious. Computer and Video Games offered similar criticism, declaring that "it was too repetitive to become anything more than a good game." Edge criticized the gameplay features such as camera control and boss difficulty. Electronic Gaming Monthly reviewers criticized the game for its easy bosses and its repetitive and short gameplay value. Famitsu liked the battles but complained about the Fuchikoma attaching to walls when not intended.

The Herald-News praised the game for being original and worth playing, unlike other movie adaptations. In 2013, Game Informer listed Ghost in the Shell as one of the best anime and manga-based games released in English, and the best of the franchise's titles; the other seven games in the list were released more than six years after Ghost in the Shell.

== See also ==
- Aeropolis 2001
