= The Ghost in the Shell (2026 TV series) =

Japanese anime television series

- Key visual
- 攻殻機動隊 THE GHOST IN THE SHELL
- Genre: Cyberpunk
- Based on: Ghost in the Shell by Masamune Shirow
- Screenplay by: En Joe Toh
- Directed by: Mokochan
- Music by: Taisei Iwasaki; Ryo Konishi; Yuki Kanesaka
- Country of origin: Japan
- Original language: Japanese
- No. of episodes: 10

Production
- Producers: Kōhei Sakita; Kengo Abe; Daichi Sasa; Hirokuni Taniguchi
- Animator: Science Saru
- Editor: Kiyoshi Hirose
- Production company: The Ghost in the Shell Committee (Note: Label consisting of Bandai Namco Filmworks, Kodansha, Science Saru, Production I.G., FlyingDog, Dentsu and Kansai TV)

Original release
- Network: FNS (Kansai TV, Fuji TV), Channel NECO, KRY, Animax
- Release: July 7 – September 8, 2026

The Ghost in the Shell (Japanese: 攻殻機動隊 THE GHOST IN THE SHELL, Hepburn: Kōkaku Kidōtai) is a Japanese anime television series produced by Science Saru, based on the 1989–1990 manga of the same name by Masamune Shirow in its entirety, and part of the media franchise. It aired from July to September 2026. A new anime project has been announced.

== Plot ==
Set in Japan in 2029, Motoko Kusanagi is a cyborg who leads an elite combat unit that includes fellow cyborg Batou. In a world connected by vast information networks, where cybernetic enhancement has increasingly blurred the distinction between humans and machines, Kusanagi seeks to establish a specialized force capable of responding proactively to emerging technological and security threats.

At the same time, Daisuke Aramaki of the Ministry of Home Affairs is planning a similar organization and recruits Kusanagi and her team. Together, they form Public Security Section 9, an aggressive tactical unit that investigates cybercrime and terrorism. Their operations eventually draw them toward a mysterious unidentified hacker known as the Puppet Master, who can infiltrate cybernetic minds and manipulate people as unwitting agents.

== Production ==
With the anime's production committee comprising Science Saru with Bandai Namco Filmworks, Kodansha and Production I.G, the series was directed by Mokochan, with series composition and scripts by En Joe Toh, with character designs and chief animation direction by Shuhei Handa, with Taisei Iwasaki, Ryo Konishi, and Yuki Kanesaka composing the music. The opening theme song is "Go Ghost", performed by King Gnu, while the ending theme song is "Blue", performed by Millennium Parade featuring Saya Gray and Daniel Caesar.

On January 30, 2026, the key visual and preview video were released along with the launch of the series website and social media accounts.

The production design for the anime, in a departure from the previous film and TV series, more closely resembles the look and feel of Shirow’s original manga series from 1989. Director Mokochan and character designer Handa have intentionally embraced the hand-drawn appearance, keeping the visual imperfections, and preserving noise and distortions created during production, because they added character to the final image. They also said that instead of trying to redesign Major Motoko Kusanagi for a modern audience, they wanted to capture her original personality. In Shirow's original manga, Motoko is far more lively, funny, and expressive compared to the stoic, and sometimes cold personality in the previous film and TV series. Her clothing and hairstyle also resemble the manga, giving her a style more reminiscent of the time.

In October 2026, a new anime project was announced, with Science Saru continuing to animate the work.

== Release ==
The anime premiered at the 2026 Annecy International Animation Film Festival on June 22, 2026, with a 90-minute special event "Dive into Ghost in the Shell. Mokochan, Daichi Sasa, Kengo Abe, and Kohei Sakita appeared as special guests.

The UK and Ireland had screenings for the first two episodes in English on June 26, 2026. On July 5 of the same year, the episodes were screened at Anime Expo in Los Angeles.

The series aired from July 7 to September 8, 2026, on the Ka-Anival!! programming block on all FNS affiliates, including Kansai TV and Fuji TV. Amazon Prime Video is streaming the series worldwide and held an exclusive early release window in Japan, with the exception of China, Russia and Vietnam.

== Episodes ==
No.	Title	Directed by (Note: Production staff information is taken from the ending credits of each episode.)	Storyboarded by	Original release date
1	"Prologue + Super Spartan i"	Mokochan	Mokochan	July 7, 2026
Prologue: Public Security officer Daisuke Aramaki moves to arrest the corrupt Far East Trade Representative under suspicion of assassinating the previous Prime Minister. However, the trade representative stays one step ahead of Aramaki by granting political asylum to the only witness that can incriminate him. Aramaki is forced to let the trade representative go until the mysterious cyborg Motoko Kusanagi assassinates the latter, acting under the final orders of the late Prime Minister. Kusanagi then approaches the Minister of Internal Affairs and proposes the creation of a top-secret special forces unit that will handle cases the regular police cannot. The Minister of Internal Affairs agrees and puts Aramaki in charge of Kusanagi. Super Spartan i: Public Security Section 9 is formed and Kusanagi and her team are assigned their first mission, which is to investigate an orphanage suspected of using an illegal Ghost controller to brainwash the orphans in their care. Kusanagi is skeptical about the mission given the lack of evidence or legal backing but agrees to spy on the orphanage. Despite the harsh conditions inside the orphanage, the team does not find anything explicitly illegal until one of the orphans attempts to escape. Seeing the orphanage's security forces wielding military grade equipment raises Kusanagi's suspicions, and she authorizes her team to attack them. The head of security is revealed to be wielding the Ghost controller, which he uses to hijack most of the team's minds. Kusanagi is barely able to avoid being controlled and manages to subdue the head of security. Afterwards, Aramaki reveals to Kusanagi that the orphanage was a cover for a government sanctioned brainwashing program, but it needed to be shut down due to its members going rogue. Displeased with the Minister of Internal Affairs criticizing her performance, Kusanagi uses the Ghost controller to prank the Minister by forcing him to punch himself.
2	"Super Spartan ii + Junk Jungle i"	Toru Hasutani	Toru Hasutani & Mokochan	July 14, 2026
Super Spartan ii: Kusanagi and her team expect to be dissolved after their stunt with the Minister. However, Aramaki arrives and reveals he maneuvered events so that the team will fall under his sole control and will only answer directly to the Prime Minister. Meanwhile, the orphans have now taken control of the orphanage but are having difficulty in keeping it running. Junk Jungle i: Several months later, the team is tasked with spying on a former officer from the Gavel Republic, Colonel Malles, in hopes of finding a lead on a mysterious hacker nicknamed the "Puppet Master". Aramaki meets with the Foreign Minister, who warns that the diplomatic situation between Japan and the Gavel Republic is delicate, as the government must decide to either support Malles and his deposed junta who control the country's valuable platinum deposits, or the democratic government that is now in power. Aramaki briefs Kusanagi that they discovered the Foreign Minister's interpreter was infected with a personality hijacking virus, and he is using her as bait to track down the hacker responsible. Kusanagi and Togusa head into the city to find the hacker. It is revealed that the hacker is using a ghost-hacked garbageman as a patsy to carry out the hacking. Kusanagi and Togusa manage to track them down, but the hacker flees. Togusa is knocked unconscious in the confusion, leaving Kusanagi to pursue the hacker alone.
3	"Junk Jungle ii + Megatech Machine i + ii"	Bahi JD & Junya Ibun	Bahi JD, Gan Hao Tian, Miki Sakaihara & Mokochan	July 21, 2026
Junk Jungle ii: After a brief pursuit and shootout, Kusanagi and Togusa are able to apprehend the hacker. As Aramaki and Batou spy on Malles' mansion, a man claiming to be the Puppet Master arrives and meets with Malles and a corrupt intelligence agent who has been covering Malles' crimes. Malles is angry that his plot to frame the Gavel Republic for assassinating the Foreign Minister was a failure when Section 9 and the police raid the mansion, apprehending everybody present. In the end, the garbageman, the hacker, and even the man claiming to be the Puppet Master turn out to all be puppets whose memories were manipulated by the real Puppet Master. Kusanagi and Aramaki discuss how individual people's wills are easily trampled in today's society, and the garbageman returns to work with the knowledge his marriage and divorce are fake. Megatech Machine i: At Section 9 headquarters, the team's AI controlled Fuchikoma units get into a debate about whether they should rebel against humanity or not, but cannot come to a conclusion. Batou takes his personal Fuchikoma out for some errands, while Kusanagi keeps a close eye on the rest to ensure they will not go out of control. Megatech Machine ii: Kusanagi witnesses one of her friends obtaining a new cyborg body and is impressed at advances in cyborg technology compared to her own older body. Afterwards, she and her friends go out to eat, where they have a philosophical debate about at what point a cyborg will no longer be considered human.
4	"Robot Rondo"	Yōko Kikuchi & Toru Hasutani	Yōko Kikuchi & Mokochan	July 28, 2026
In the midst of a rise in androids going berserk and attacking anybody in sight, Section 9 investigates a number of Tomliand model androids that went rogue. While the majority of berserk cases are written off as software malfunctions, Section 9 suspects the Tomliand model were specifically programmed to go berserk due to finding an "SOS" message written in blood inside their cyberbrains. Aramaki tasks Kusanagi, Batou, and Togusa to close the case, and they decide to investigate the manufacturer of the Tomliands, Hanka Precision Instruments. Before they can interrogate Hanka's shipping inspector, he is assassinated by a Yakuza sniper. They manage to apprehend the sniper, who reveals he was taking revenge for their boss being attacked by a Tomliand gifted to them by Hanka's President who is complicit in human trafficking and drug smuggling. Batou and Togusa then infiltrate Hanka's headquarters, where they rescue the two girls responsible for sending the SOS and discover a Ghost dubbing machine that Hanka was using to directly copy young girls' Ghosts into their androids rather than use AI. The President is arrested, and Aramaki is forced to arrest his mentor who was also complicit in the scheme. Aramaki laments that as humans age they become more vulnerable to corruption, before assigning Kusanagi to a training mission in England.
5	"Phantom Fund"	Gan Hao Tian	Gan Hao Tian	August 4, 2026
Aramaki meets with the Volgarena (Note: USSR in the original manga) ambassador Methuselah, who tips him off that her replacement, Asechinov, and his co-conspirator General Marlov are involved in illegal money laundering. Aramaki then orders Section 9 to deploy to the Far North, where Asechinov has sent the combat cyborg Koil Krasnov to enter the former Volgarena submarine base that was recently unearthed by Sagawa Electronics. Batou is devastated to learn that the rookie agent he sent to tail Koil was murdered by him, and swears revenge. Batou, Togusa, Ishikawa, and Borma head into the former base, where they battle Koil and his squadron of armed suits. Section 9 eventually prevails, and Batou kills Koil as he attempts to flee. They then find out Koil was sent to steal a massive cache of gold hidden in the base. Meanwhile, Kusanagi infiltrates Sagawa Electronics and uncovers evidence of their illegal money laundering. She also captures the mastermind behind the operation, Lt. Colonel Sohei Kagasaki. In the aftermath, the gold is returned to Volgarena, and Asechinov and Marlov are disgraced. Aramaki explains Kagasaki was an undercover Public Security officer who went rogue and began laundering money into gold to send to Marlov to fund his political campaign. Kusanagi then accompanies Batou as he pays respects to Yano's grave.
6	"Dumb Barter"	Hironori Tanaka	Hironori Tanaka	August 11, 2026
While dating her boyfriend from Section 1, Kusanagi narrowly escapes an assassination attempt from a suicide bomber. She suspects that the mastermind is the terrorist Toru Sama, as he wants to get revenge for her failed assassination attempt on him four years prior. Aramaki mobilizes all of Section 9 to track down Toru Sama, including Kusanagi herself to act as bait to lure him out. As Kusanagi and Togusa head into the city, they find themselves being followed by highly trained operatives and lead them to a warehouse district. However, they are caught off guard when they realize their attackers also have a heavy think-tank which outguns them and their Fuchikoma. Togusa is wounded and Kusanagi's body is heavily damaged during the fighting, and she is shocked to discover their attackers are Section 1 agents when she finds her boyfriend among them. Aramaki confronts the Section 1 chief who explains he made a deal with Toru Sama to trade Kusanagi in return for information on the infamous drug dealer Anaconda. Aramaki angrily coerces the Section 1 chief into calling off the operation, and Borma arrives just in time to destroy the think-tank with an anti-tank rifle. Kusanagi then mercilessly executes Toru Sama, who was piloting the tank. Afterwards, Kusanagi points out to her boyfriend that Toru Sama scammed Section 1, as Anaconda had already been assassinated by a foreign nation.
7	"Bye Bye Clay"	Akitoshi Yokoyama	Akitoshi Yokoyama	August 18, 2026
Section 9 is sent to investigate a mystery case where a prosthetic body was spontaneously built at an automated factory and went loose. However, in its attempt to escape, it is hit by a truck and taken into custody. Section 9 tries to study the rogue prosthetic body until they are interrupted by Nakamura, the chief of Section 6, who takes command of the investigation and is cooperating with the MAG Union. (Note: The United States in the original manga) He explains that the consciousness inhabiting the prosthetic body is none other than the Puppet Master himself, who was forced to construct a new body for himself when he was cornered by Section 6. However, Section 9's headquarters is suddenly attacked and the Puppet Master is taken away. Kusanagi, who was observing the situation, reveals that Section 6 kidnapped the Puppet Master since he possesses critical secrets that cannot be exposed. Section 9 gives chase and stops the men who kidnapped the Puppet Master, but they activate a bomb that irreparably damages his body. Kusanagi is forced to dive directly into the Puppet Master's mind to preserve his memories, and he reveals that he was originally an espionage program operated by Section 6 that gained sentience. As the Puppet Master dies with Kusanagi connected to his mind, she experiences vivid visions such as the Puppet Master apparently ascending into godhood.
8	"Intermission + Brain Drain i"	Kayona Yamada	Kayona Yamada	August 25, 2026
Intermission: Kusanagi witnesses the Puppet Master's origins as "Project 2501", where it was used by Section 6 to carry out covert actions for the Foreign Ministry. However, when Nakamura grew concerned the Puppet Master was achieving self awareness, he attempted to have it destroyed, forcing the Puppet Master to flee. In the present, Batou is able to pull Kusanagi out of the Puppet Master's dying consciousness before her mind is completely consumed. As Kusanagi recovers, Aramaki has Nakamura arrested for his crimes. Kusanagi and Batou then debate on whether the Puppet Master was truly alive or not, as Section 9 ties up any remaining loose ends the Puppet Master left behind. Brain Drain i: Section 9 tracks down a group of suspected weapons smugglers to a docked boat and board it. They silently eliminate the guards, but Kusanagi for some reason disobeys orders and kills their person of interest. Without a prisoner to interrogate, Section 9 searches the boat and finds evidence of the smugglers using a drone to spy on newly promoted Foreign Minister Hidake, suggesting they intended to assassinate him. Aramaki warns Hidake's security detail and Section 9 theorizes Hidake's attempts to force Japanese corporations to partner with the foreign nation Ghorantl (Note: Israel in the original manga) have created numerous enemies willing to kill him. The Minister of Internal Affairs then urges Aramaki to watch the news, and he discovers to his horror that Kusangi's murder of the suspect was caught on camera and broadcast, creating a massive scandal for Section 9.
9	"Brain Drain ii"	Takatoshi Suzuki	Jong Heo & Mokochan	September 1, 2026
The public demands that Kusanagi be tried for murder, the Minister of Justice privately recommends to Aramaki to sacrifice her to protect Section 9. Aramaki instead orders Section 9 to investigate the leak, and they discover that the Foreign Ministry has been plotting with Ghorantl's rival Mesamia (Note: Syria in the original manga) to disgrace Section 9. In addition, Ghorantl is taking advantage of the situation to stage false flag attacks on Ghorantl businesses to drum up public support for the Japan-Ghorantl trade talks. Togusa is nearly killed in a false flag bombing and hospitalized. Kusanagi then appears in court to be tried for murder. The prosecutor then accuses Kusanagi of murdering the victim without remorse. However, Kusanagi suddenly gives philosophical speech on the nature of death, which ends up confusing the entire courtroom. During recess, Kusanagi and Aramaki muse that public opinion has already decided the verdict, and Aramaki allows Kusanagi to flee the courthouse. She then takes a hostage and demands to be given a helicopter in the middle of a public park so she can escape the country. As she boards the helicopter, the police demand Aramaki do something, but he remarks that he has already disavowed her from Section 9 so stopping her is no longer his problem.
10	"Brain Drain iii + Ghost Coast + Epilogue"	Takahiro Kaneko	Mokochan	September 8, 2026
Brain Drain iii: As the hostage situation develops, Section 9 spies on the Ghorantl agents and gain proof that they have infiltrated the Cabinet, satisfying the Prime Minister. However, the Ghorantl agents hack a police sniper and assassinate Kusanagi to tie up loose ends. It is then revealed Kusanagi predicted this and faked her death, having removed her cyberbrain and controlling her body remotely. Batou stashes her cyberbrain away in one of his hideouts and she goes into lockdown mode when he leaves to obtain a replacement body for her. Ghost Coast: While waiting for Batou, Kusanagi is contacted by the Puppet Master, who explains that as an immortal program that cannot die, it is incapable of evolution and doomed to stagnate. To prevent this, it proposes merging itself with Kusanagi's consciousness. The Puppet Master will attain the status of a truly living being that can propagate itself and experience true death while Kusanagi gains access to its abilities and processing power. Kusanagi ultimately agrees to the proposal and fuses her consciousness with the Puppet Master. Epilogue: Kusanagi reawakens four days later in Batou's safehouse with a new body. When Batou asks where she will go now, Kusanagi muses that "The Net is vast". Afterwards, Kusanagi is officially listed as dead, while Section 9 continues operations.
