= Tawanda Manyimo =

Zimbabwean-born New Zealand actor

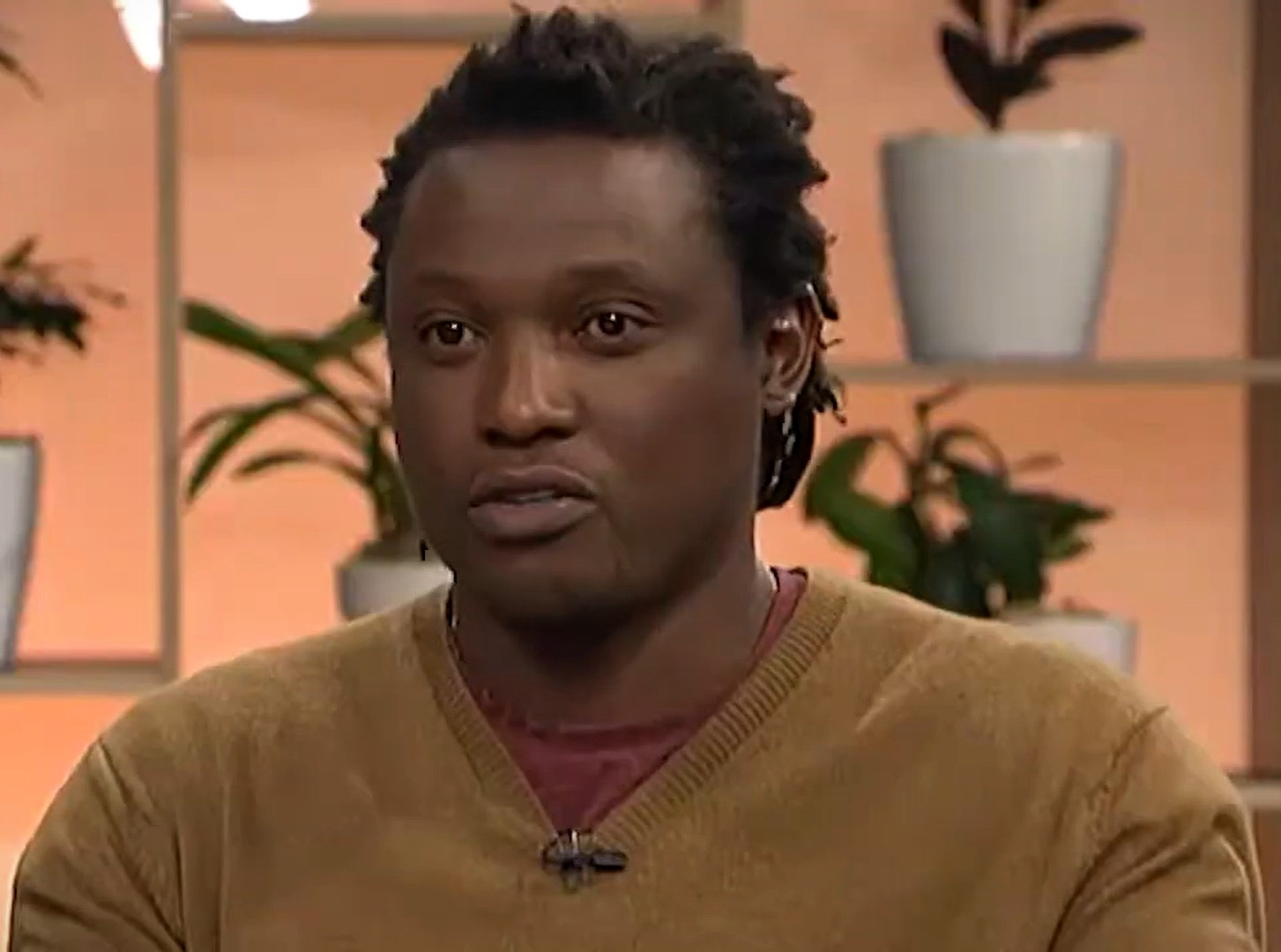
Manyimo in 2017

Tawanda Manyimo (born 1981) is a Zimbabwean-born New Zealand actor.

Manyimo was born in Bulawayo and educated at Tennyson Primary School, and Milton High School.

Manyimo left his job in logistics in Zimbabwe in 2003, and migrated to New Zealand at the age of 22. Manyimo graduated from Toi Whakaari: New Zealand Drama School in 2011 with a Bachelor of Performing Arts (Acting).

He lives in Titirangi.

== Selected filmography ==
- The Rover (2014)
- Ghost in the Shell (2017)
- The Meg (2018)
