= The Laughing Man (short story) =

Short story by J. D. Salinger

"The Laughing Man" is a short story by J. D. Salinger, published originally in The New Yorker on March 19, 1949; and also in Salinger's short story collection Nine Stories. It largely takes the structure of a story within a story and is thematically occupied with the relationship between narrative and narrator, and the end of youth. The story is inspired by the 1869 Victor Hugo novel of the same name: The Man Who Laughs (L'homme qui rit).

== Plot summary ==
An unnamed narrator recounts his experiences as a nine-year-old member of the Comanche Club in New York City in 1928. The leader of the club, “The Chief”, is a young law student at New York University who is described as lacking in physical attractiveness but appears beautiful to the narrator. He is widely respected by his troop for his athletic strength and storytelling ability.

Every day, after the troop has completed its activities, The Chief gathers the boys for the next episode in an ongoing story about the eponymous Laughing Man. In the format of a serial adventure novel, The Chief's story describes the Laughing Man as the child of missionaries who was kidnapped by bandits in China, who deformed his face by compressing it in a vise; he was obliged to wear a mask, but compensated by being profoundly athletic and possessed of a great Robin Hood-like charm and the ability to speak with animals.

The narrator summarizes the Chief's installments of the Laughing Man's escapades, presenting him as a sort of comic book hero crossing “the Chinese-Paris border” to commit acts of heroic larceny and tweaking his nose at his archenemy “Marcel Dufarge, the internationally famous detective and witty consumptive”.

Eventually, The Chief takes up with a young woman, Mary Hudson, a student at Wellesley College who is described as very beautiful and athletically gifted.

As the Chief's relationship with Mary waxes and wanes, so too do the fortunes of The Laughing Man. One day, the Chief presents an installment where the Laughing Man is taken prisoner by his arch-rival, bound to a tree, and in mortal danger; then he ends the episode on a cliffhanger. Immediately afterward, the Chief brings his troop to a baseball diamond, where Mary Hudson arrives. The Chief and Mary have a conversation out of earshot from the boys, and then both return, together yet distraught. The Chief grabs Mary's sleeve, but she runs away and the narrator never sees her again.

When they get back on the bus, the Chief is in a foul mood and tells the final installment of the story. He kills off the primary antagonists dismissively, the Laughing Man's fateful companion, and subsequently kills the Laughing Man, much to the Comanches’ dismay.

== Film adaptation ==
Salinger was reluctant to allow his works to be adapted for film. However, he instructed the entertainment licenses department of his literary agency, Harold Ober Associates, to send his story out to producers for a potential film deal. The move was motivated by financial need, but the interested parties only expressed desire to adapt his novel The Catcher in the Rye.

In 2002, Spanish director J.A. Bayona released the short film El Hombre Esponja, crediting Salinger's The Laughing Man as inspiration. In that film, “The Chief” (as the plot takes place in 1980s Spain) tells the story of superhero “Sponge-Man”, who never cries as his powers retain the last tear inside his body, and his nemesis, Oniongirl - also killing off the character after a conversation with the woman, here named Socorro Soriano. The kids are also identified as the Comanches.

== References in other media ==
In season 1 of Ghost in the Shell: Stand Alone Complex (2002), the "Laughing Man case" is a main plot line, incorporating references to stories by J. D. Salinger.

In Whit Stillman's The Last Days of Disco (1998), the character Alice is asked what her dream book to publish would be. She answers, a book of new J.D. Salinger stories "more in the direction of The Laughing Man, or Raise High the Roof Beam, Carpenters..."
