= Public Security Section 9 =

Fictional intelligence department

- A fan artist's impression of Section 9's sign plate

Publication information
- Publisher: Kodansha (Japan), Dark Horse Comics (US) (CA)
- First appearance: Ghost in the Shell #03 "Junk Jungle" (1989) (after official formation)
- Created by: Masamune Shirow

In-story information
- Type of organization: Special law enforcement; Cyber threat intelligence and criminal intelligence unit; Offensive domestic counter-cyberterrorism actions
- Leader(s): Daisuke Aramaki
- Agent(s): Motoko Kusanagi; Batou; Togusa; Maven; Ladriya; Borma; Ishikawa; Saito; Pazu; Proto; Azuma; Yano (Deceased); Hikagi; Soma; Purin Ezaki

Public Security Section 9 (Japanese: 公安9課, Hepburn: Kōan Kyūka) is a fictional gendarmerie-style information security and intelligence department from Masamune Shirow's Ghost in the Shell manga and anime series. In the franchise, its jurisdiction exists under the Ministry of Home Affairs (内務省, Naimu-shō). In some translations, the name is given as Public Safety Section 9. In the original film, it is known as the Shell Squad or Security Police Section 9. In the original publication of the manga, it was known as Mobile Armored Riot Police Section 9. Regardless of translation, when spoken of by the characters, it is simply referred to as Section 9.

The Section 9 is composed of former military officers, forensics scientists, and police detectives; these agents answer only to the Chief Director and the Prime Minister of Japan. Most information about Section 9 remains highly classified; the Ministry of Home Affairs does not comment on the details of its activities. The public at large is unaware that Section 9 even exists, though the National Diet and other security forces sections are generally aware of them as a black operations unit. This allows Section 9 to operate independently from governmental oversight, cutting through red tape and bureaucracy.

Many of Section-9's functions are unique, its activities in support of national security are comparable to those of the American FBI, the British MI5 and the Russian FSB. Their structure was based on the German GSG-9. Due to cross-training exercises in the past with the British Special Air Service's (SAS) 22nd Regiment, which also included personnel exchanges, Section 9's structure has been partially influenced by the SAS.

== History ==
Public Security Section 9 was established as a search and rescue organization; its mission statement has evolved to meet the demands of an uncertain and changing world characterized by invisible enemies who can destabilize entire countries from a simple reach of their keyboard, and by a blurring of the lines—between war and politics, combatants and civilians, crime and terrorism—have become increasingly irrelevant.

Officially billed as an international organization, it is actually a covert counter-terrorist network and anti-crime unit operating in the Japanese National Public Safety Commission. The organization is modeled on the idea that counter-terrorism traditionally consists of two interlocking areas: "pre-" and a "post-incident". With its unique organizational structure, Section 9 is empowered and expected to handle both areas, removing bureaucracy and logistics that might otherwise slow down the process. Its operatives are allowed to act with or without government consent as they are almost unknown to the public eye.

In particular, Section 9 and its members are among the best counter-fourth generation cyberwarfare operatives in the country, and as a result usually end up involved in cybercrime cases relating to cybernetic lifeforms and the Internet, such as hacking and cyberterrorism. Even though Section 9 team is the "crème de la crème" of military prowess, there is a competitiveness with the other Section teams as well.

=== Ghost in the Shell (1995) ===
Major Motoko Kusanagi is dispatched by Section 9 to spy on a building in New Port City. A foreign power conspires to recruit a domestic programmer to fix the Project 2501 "bug." The team moves in while Major activates her thermoptic camouflage. The foreign official refuses to return the programmer, while Kusanagi moves in and kills him.

=== Stand Alone Complex ===
==== Season 1 ====
During the investigation of the Laughing Man case, Major Kusanagi poses as the Laughing Man in order to uncover a conspiracy against Serano Genomics, a nanotechnology (micro machine) company owned by the Japanese government. After higher-ranking government officials uncover information about the Section 9 investigation, the government disbands the agency and declares war on them.

In preparation for an attack on their headquarters by the Umibozu's shock troopers and their Type 303 Armed Suit robots, all remaining Section 9 members barricade themselves into the building and fight the invaders with heavy weaponry. Failing that, they assemble a diversion and escape through a passage in the sewers of New Port City. They are all eventually captured, with the Major apparently killed.

Togusa spends the next three months wondering what happened to the rest of Section 9 before encountering Batou. The whole thing turns out to have been Aramaki's plan, sacrificing Section 9 in order to leave the prime suspect wide-open to arrest, investigation, and prosecution. Everyone, including the Major is fine, and Aramaki is in the process of rebuilding and securing funding for the newly reborn Section 9, which happens in 2nd GIG.

==== Season 2 ====
The second season starts with Section 9 non-existent in an official capacity due to an amendment to the Special Forces Bill. The first episode involves a hostage situation in which nine terrorists, who call themselves the Individual Eleven, are holed up in the Chinese Embassy, demanding a swift change in the Refugee Action Policy. They demand the freedom of the refugees from the standpoint that refugees drain the country. The previous Japanese Prime Minister issued a temporary bill that allowed for the entrance of refugees into certain zones, but the bill was never repealed. Because the new Prime Minister, Kayabuki, plans to repeal the policy soon, she has to act quickly on the terrorists before their demands become known in order to ensure it doesn't appear that she was caving in to the terrorists' pressure.

Section 9 is promised full reestablishment, and the approval of their new budget proposal that includes the reinstatement of sentinent tanks (Tachikomas), on the condition that there are no hostage casualties in the process of stopping the terrorists before the press blackout runs out. From this point on the 2nd season goes on to focus on the refugee issue from multiple perspectives, along with providing additional background information on almost all of the characters.

A new group emerges in this season, The Individual Eleven. This group first appears in the premiere episode as a group of Individual Eleven "copycats" take hostages in the Chinese Embassy. Later in the series it is revealed that the Individual Eleven's true intentions were to harm the wellbeing of refugees that had taken shelter in Japan at the end of World War IV. This group destroys itself in a public display of mutually assisted suicide among the members. Only one survives, Hideo Kuze, who then sides with the refugees and confounds Section 9 as to his motives.

==== Solid State Society ====
Section 9 is radically reformed after the Major leaves in order to pursue investigations of her own. The section has increased in size, and is now run by Togusa because Batou declined the position. Solid State Society initially focuses on the cyberbrain suicides of members of a terrorist organization that gained asylum in Japan. This case leads to the discovery that around twenty thousand children may have been abducted. The mastermind behind the crimes is known as "The Puppeteer", and is classified as a Super Wizard Class Hacker.

=== Arise ===
Arise is an alternate universe telling of the formation of Section 9. Major Kusanagi, an ex-army hacker, is recruited by Aramaki and charged with putting together a team to deal with high level hacking threats. Over the course of the series, while pursuing her own personal investigation, she encounters and works with (sometimes double crossed by) all of the original team members. At the end of the series she offers them positions on her team. A notable change is that Togusa is involved from the beginning rather than being recruited some time after the team's formation.

=== Ghost in the Shell (2017) ===
According to Tawanda Manyimo, part of what makes the Section 9 group so interesting is they aren't controlled by the government. "We are able to cut through red tape and bureaucracy it seems," he said "Who doesn't want that? We can actually just do what we want, in essence. And we answer to essentially to Aramaki and the Major, so we're almost a rogue renegade, but not quite. And I think that's a unique position because in the world, there is a lot of political intrigue."

== Location ==
Public Security Section 9 is located in the fictional Japanese city of Niihama-shi (also known as New Port City). The exact location of Section 9's headquarters is held as top-secret and is only known by the Japanese government and Section 9 employees. Their building disguised as a false security company.

Section 9 Headquarters facilities include a rooftop helipad, underground car park, Operator-managed control room, cyber-warfare and information gathering room, holding cells, meeting rooms and Tachikoma/Fuchikoma/Uchikoma workshop.

== Members ==
Section 9 operatives as seen in GITS: SAC_2045

Section 9's operatives are trained in a broad range of disciplines, including criminal investigation, cybercrime-criminology, and digital forensics to unconventional warfare, special reconnaissance, information operations, cyberwarfare, counter-terrorism, hostage rescue, direct action and special operations.

=== Agents ===
Name	Rank / MOS code	Description
Daisuke Aramaki	Lieutenant Colonel/Section Chief	Head of Section 9 and advisor to Prime Minister Yoko Kayabuki. He and two other friends he served with under Colonel Tonouda were known as the Tonouda Three.
Motoko Kusanagi	Major/Field Commander; Wizard-class cyberwarfare and wetwork specialist	Cybernetic counter-cyberterrorist field commander and tactical squad leader of Section 9. She is almost completely cyberized, except for part of her brain and spinal cord. Because of this, she has a reputation as an emotionless commander. However, she clings fiercely to what remains of her humanity and bases her self on her memories of life before the cyberbody.
Ishikawa	Executive Officer/Lead Investigator; Covert Intelligence and Technology specialist	Ishikawa left the front lines long ago to turn his combat prowess against cybercriminals, but he still jumps into the fray if the Major asks it. He is a veteran combatant who has worked with Kusanagi longer than anyone and he knows better than to ever question her decisions.
Batou	Sergeant/Lead Investigator/Point man	Batou is a skilled ex-soldier with a heavily cyberized body, most notably his cybereyes. He is a masterful combatant known for his gregarious personality, but can be prone to hot-headed outbursts when faced with injustice. Though somewhat tactless, he is affectionate towards machines and animals.
Togusa	Lieutenant/Lead Investigator/2nd Field Commander	Togusa is an anomaly on the team. He was hired from the police force because of his reputation as an incorruptible detective, he has very few cybernetic implants, does not have a military background, and the only member who's a husband and a father. Though he is not always as confident in battle as the rest of the team, he is a courageous and earnest operative who would go against any odds for justice. Togusa leads Section 9 during the events of Solid State Society.
Maven	R&D/Combat specialist	Maven is an expert on guerilla warfare and topography, stemming from her time in the jungles of South America. She first came to Chief Aramaki's attention during an operation in which she single-handedly held off an insurgent attack after her entire squad was killed. Since then, she has been working for Section 9, where she has proven both resourceful and deadly. She is with Section 9 in the First Assault Online game.
Ladriya	Investigator/Advanced weapons specialist	Ladriya is the only Section 9 character not drawn specifically from the Ghost in the Shell source material, and she adds another female perspective to the team. Her skill is with a knife, though Danusia Sama credits her with being "one of the more intuitive of the gang."
Borma	Investigator, cyberwarfare expert and demolition specialist	Borma is the team's large caliber and explosive weapons expert. However, his large size belies his true specialty: cyberbrain combat. He frequently provides backup alongside Ishikawa and spends most of his time in the dive room at headquarters.
Saito	Tactical Sniper specialist	Sato is a cold-hearted warrior with an unbreakable poker face. He is one of the least cyberized members of Section 9, but that has not stopped him from becoming the unit's top sniper. His demeanor is that of a consummate soldier: professional, calculating, and lethal.
Pazu	Undercover Investigator, infiltration expert	Rumored to have been a member of the Yakuza before joining Section 9, Paz is an undercover investigator and is known to be a master of infiltration. He is an expert on hand to hand combat, favoring a folding knife over most other weapons.
Azuma	Recruit/Field Agent	One of Section 9's newly recruited field operatives from JGSDF intelligence. He was advised to the chief through a friend.
Yano	Recruit/Field Agent	One of Section 9's newly recruited rookie and field operatives alongside Azuma.
Tech Specialists	Tachikoma Maintenance/technological forensics and observation	In charge of Tachikoma maintenance and overall oversight of them. They also provide forensic data, and overall observations on technology.

=== AI personnel ===
Unit	Specialty	Description
Fuchikoma	Think Tanks	A 1-man tank (walker/roller) used by members of Section 9 of the National Public Safety Commission in Masamune Shirow's manga Ghost in the Shell. They have four legs and two simple hands with three fingers on extensible arms which double as machine guns. Additional armament consists of either a grenade launcher or heavy machine gun mounted in the tanks "mouth" under its large optical sensor. They possess a simple artificial intelligence and can act independently to support their user in combat. When not in use, they exhibit a childlike personality and provide much of the humor in the series, while also being used to elaborate on Shirow's philosophy and ideas. Fuchikomas were replaced with Tachikomas in the Stand Alone Complex anime.
Tachikoma	Think Tanks	These experimental tanks are used during combat missions and are equipped with a 7.62×51mm light machine gun built into the right arm and an optional 50mm grenade launcher or 12.7mm rotary cannon mounted on a central hardpoint. They can be ridden in like a vehicle and controlled from inside, or remotely through the net. Their systems are universally linked through a central satellite where they develop AI traits similar to young children.
Uchikoma	Think Tanks	These tanks are covered with ultra-heavy armor (unlike the Tachikoma units) in the Stand Alone Complex anime, in which they appear at the end of the second season and during the Solid State Society film. Uchikomas never reach a state similar to Tachikomas, because the surroundings that they exist in do not provide the requirements for an advancement from AI to individual.
Operators	Operators	Are an advanced line of gynoids designed to handle the day-to-day matters within Section 9. Although they look human, their AI operating systems are not sophisticated enough to process complex logical problems. The Tachikomas demonstrated their own superiority by causing an Operator to experience a crash using the Liar paradox. Operators confirm commands by repeating them back to humans. Operators can act together as a parallel processor network.
Proto	Tachikoma's Maintenance Technician/Field agent in Solid State Society	Proto can also be used as an Operator. It is later discovered that he is in fact an experimental bioroid, and Proto stands for prototype. He holds a higher position than operators and provides a position similar to assistant to the Chief late into 2nd Gig, and also during Solid State Society.
