= Bob Buchholz =

American actor

Robert Buchholz
- Other names: Robert Wicks; Robert Wickes; Rich Buckloid
- Occupations: Voice actor, voice director, script writer, producer
- Years active: 1982–present

Robert Buchholz is an American voice actor, writer, story editor, and voice director. He has provided voices for anime and video games. He is the owner of Spliced Bread Productions.

== Filmography ==
=== Anime ===
- Akira – Ryu (Animaze dub)
- A Whisker Away – Kusugi-sensei
- Battle Athletes Victory – Alfred Gurtlent
- Beastars – Oguma (Netflix dub)
- The Big O – Beck Gold/Jason Beck
- Cowboy Bebop – Tom Wiles
- Digimon: Digital Monsters – Additional Voices (Adventure and Adventure 02)
- Digimon: The Movie – Andy, Uncle Al, Additional Voices
- Digimon Adventure (standalone dub) – Truck Driver 2
- Digimon Adventure: Our War Game! (standalone dub) – Sho (Uncle Al/Andy)
- Duel Masters – Additional Voices
- Fushigi Yûgi – Tokaki (Young)
- Ghost in the Shell: SAC 2045 – Paz
- Ghost in the Shell: Stand Alone Complex – Pazu
- If I See You in My Dreams – Director Hamaoka
- Kashimashi: Girl Meets Girl – Sora Hitoshi
- Mazinkaiser SKL – Koujidani
- Metal Fighter Miku – Tokichiro Harajuku
- Mobile Suit Gundam 08th MS Team – Pilot (Episode 9)
- Mouse – Heitarou Onizuka
- Nodame Cantabile – Hajime Tanioka, Tatsuo Noda
- Outlaw Star – Gene Starwind
- Trigun – Steve
- Wolf's Rain – Hubb Lebowski
- Zenki – Zenki (Big)

=== Non-anime ===
- El Chavo (English version) – Professor Jirafales
- The Happy Cricket (English version) – Barnaby
- Loopdidoo (English version) – Loopdidoo (season 1–2), Dad Flea, Gonzague, Petunia's dad, Roby
- Bird Island – Tin

=== Video games ===
- Resident Evil Outbreak: File 2 – George Hamilton, additional voices
- Atlantica Online – Various NPCs
- Ghost in the Shell: Stand Alone Complex – Pazu
- Xenosaga Episode I: Der Wille Zur Macht – Councilman, Dr. Caspase (uncredited)

== Production work ==
=== Voice direction ===
- Ah My Buddha
- Ajin
- B-Daman Crossfire
- Baten Kaitos Origins
- Crisis Core: Final Fantasy VII
- Culdcept Saga
- Cyborg 009 VS Devilman
- Devilman Crybaby
- Digimon Adventure
- Digimon Adventure 02
- Digimon: The Movie
- Dirge of Cerberus -Final Fantasy VII-
- Dissidia: Final Fantasy
- Dissidia 012 Final Fantasy
- Duel Masters (Season 1.5)
- Final Fantasy VII Advent Children
- Great Teacher Onizuka
- Hot Shots Golf: Open Tee
- Hubert & Takako
- Kingdom Hearts II
- Kingdom Hearts Re:Chain of Memories
- Kingdom Hearts Coded
- Kingdom Hearts 358/2 Days
- Kingdom Hearts Birth by Sleep
- Kingdom Hearts 3D: Dream Drop Distance
- Knights of Sidonia
- Kuromukuro
- Marseille
- Nodame Cantabile
- Pokémon Origins
- The 3rd Birthday
- The World Ends with You
- Violetta
- Viewtiful Joe
- Wakfu (Season 3)
- Yukikaze

=== Script writer ===
- Bobobo-bo Bo-bobo
- Digimon Adventure
- Digimon Adventure 02
- Digimon: The Movie
- Dual! Parallel Trouble Adventures
- Duel Masters
- Great Teacher Onizuka
- Mad Movies with the L.A. Connection
- Rave Master
- Vampire Princess Miyu
- Yukikaze

=== Casting direction ===
- Final Fantasy VII: Advent Children (additional casting and voice recording)

== See also ==
- List of voice actors
