= Motoko Kusanagi =

Ghost in the Shell protagonist

Motoko Kusanagi The Major
- Ghost in the Shell character
- Major Motoko Kusanagi as seen in Ghost in the Shell (1995)
- First appearance: Ghost in the Shell #01 "Prologue" (April 22, 1989)
- Created by: Masamune Shirow
- Voiced by: Japanese: Atsuko Tanaka (most media); Maaya Sakamoto (young, (Note: Maaya Sakamoto voiced a young Motoko in the 1995 film and Stand Alone Complex series.) Arise, The New Movie, The Ghost in the Shell TV series); Hiromi Tsuru (1997 video game); English: Mimi Woods (1995 film, 1997 video game); Mona Marshall (young; 1995 film); Mary Elizabeth McGlynn (S.A.C. TV series, Innocence, First Assault Online, SAC_2045); Peggy O'Neal (young; S.A.C. TV series); Andrea Kwan (S.A.C. TV series [Animax dub]); Alison Matthews (S.A.C. OVAs); Elizabeth Maxwell (Arise, The New Movie); Suzie Yeung (The Ghost in the Shell TV series)

In-universe information
- Alias: The Major

Major Motoko Kusanagi (Japanese: 草薙・素子, Hepburn: Kusanagi Motoko), or just "The Major", is the main protagonist of the Ghost in the Shell manga and anime series, created by Masamune Shirow. She is a cybernetic human, augmented with a synthetic "full-body prosthesis". She is employed as the field commander of Public Security Section 9, a fictional anti-cybercrime law-enforcement division of the Japanese National Public Safety Commission. A strong-willed, physically powerful, and highly intelligent cyberhero, she is well known for her skills in deduction, hacking, and military tactics.

== Conception and creation ==
Motoko Kusanagi's body was designed by the manga author and artist Masamune Shirow to be a mass production model so she would not be conspicuous. Her electrical and mechanical system within is special and features parts unavailable on the civilian market. Shirow intentionally chose this appearance so Motoko would not be harvested for those parts. In the 1995 anime film adaptation, character designer and key animator supervisor Hiroyuki Okiura made her different from her original manga counterpart, stating, "Motoko Kusanagi is a cyborg. Therefore, her body is strong and youthful. However her human mentality is considerably older than she looks. I tried to depict this maturity in her character instead of the original girl created by Masamune Shirow."

Kenji Kamiyama had a difficult time identifying her and could not understand her motives during the first season of the anime series Ghost in the Shell: Stand Alone Complex. Due to this, he created an episode in the second season where he recounted her past. He was then able to describe her as a human who was chosen to gain this superhuman power; she probably believes that she has an obligation to use that ability for the benefit of others. English voice actor and director Mary Elizabeth McGlynn states she loved playing the role of Motoko Kusanagi and described her as "someone [who] was that strong, and still kind of feminine at times, but also kick-ass".

"Motoko Kusanagi" is stated in the original manga to be "an obvious pseudonym". The name translates roughly as "Elemental Girl Excalibur", as 'Kusanagi' is a reference to Kusanagi no Tsurugi, a semi-legendary sword that forms part of the Imperial Regalia of Japan. In the final episode of 2nd GIG, she states that she does not remember her birth name.

Little is known of Motoko Kusanagi's early history. Only hints at some of her background, usually through flashbacks, and nearly always from the points of view of others; rarely from Kusanagi's herself. The Stand Alone Complex television series establishes that Motoko Kusanagi has lived within cyborg "shells" practically since birth. The Arise video series shows that Motoko Kusanagi earned her military rank "Major" by serving in the JGSDF. Motoko Kusanagi earned her reputation as "Fire Starter," a master computer hacker, through years of experience and activity.

In the 2017 Paramount Pictures and DreamWorks Pictures live action Ghost in the Shell film directed by Rupert Sanders, Scarlett Johansson portrays Motoko.

Kusanagi is bisexual and has sexual relationships with women in the manga, including sex with two women in a threesome in cyberspace. The scene of her having sex with two women was not published in the manga, uncut, until 2017, as the scene had been, in prior editions, censored. She also kisses a female sex worker in the 2016 live-action movie for the franchise. In addition, Kusanagi had an unnamed boyfriend who works for Section One, and they have been dating for seven months, which her co-worker Batou considered "a new record", as shown in the 2026 series and other media.

== Reception ==
Motoko Kusanagi was well received by media. Motoko ranked 13th in IGN's list of the top anime characters of all time in 2009, commenting that "though she may be cool, professional, and mostly artificial, she's unquestionably human, and following her adventures through Ghost in the Shell was never less than fascinating". In 2014, IGN ranked her as the 11th greatest anime character of all time, saying that "Motoko was a stunning example of a strong female character that didn't need to have her feminism make a statement." Motoko's female identity and appearance is countered by the autonomous subjectivity, resulting in a "male" cyborg body which cannot menstruate. (Note: The English dubbed version changes the line to "Must be a loose wire." Orbaugh described this change as "sanitized".) The original film depicts Motoko's identity and ontological concerns with the evolution of a being, resulting in full subjectivity, through a new form of reproduction with the Puppet Master. (Note: "The juxtaposition, in the first five minutes of the film, of her reference to menstruation with the scenes of her cyborgian replication, immediately underscores the fact that this film's theme is the problematic of reproductive sexuality in a posthuman subject.") Austin Corbett commented on the lack of sexualization from her team as freedom from femininity, noting that Motoko is "overtly feminine, and clearly non-female". Mania.com ranks her as the 4th most skilled gunslinger in anime citing how strong she is regardless of her several appearances in media.

Fans of her character, in Western countries, have read the character as a "bisexual icon". Gizmodo noted that Kusanagi's goofy traits in the manga have been described by fans as emblematic of her being a "bisexual disaster."
