= Ghost in the Shell: Stand Alone Complex – Solid State Society =

2006 film directed by Kenji Kamiyama

- Ghost in the Shell: Stand Alone Complex: Solid State Society DVD cover
- Based on: Ghost in the Shell by Masamune Shirow
- Written by: Kenji Kamiyama; Shotaro Suga; Yoshiki Sakurai
- Directed by: Kenji Kamiyama
- Starring: Atsuko Tanaka; Akio Ōtsuka; Koichi Yamadera; Osamu Saka; Yutaka Nakano; Tōru Ōkawa; Takashi Onozuka; Taro Yamaguchi
- Theme music composer: Yoko Kanno
- Country of origin: Japan
- Original language: Japanese

Production
- Producers: Mitsuhisa Ishikawa; Shigeru Watanabe
- Cinematography: Kōji Tanaka
- Editor: Junichi Uematsu
- Running time: 105 minutes
- Production companies: Production I.G. Bandai Entertainment; Manga Entertainment
- Budget: ¥360 million

Original release
- Release: September 1, 2006

Ghost in the Shell: Stand Alone Complex – Solid State Society (Japanese: 攻殻機動隊 STAND ALONE COMPLEX Solid State Society, Hepburn: Kōkaku Kidōtai Sutando Arōn Konpurekkusu Soriddo Sutēto Sosaieti) is a 2006 Japanese anime science fiction television film and part of the Ghost in the Shell: Stand Alone Complex series based on Masamune Shirow's manga Ghost in the Shell. It was produced by Production I.G and directed by Kenji Kamiyama.

The film is set in 2034, two years after the events of 2nd GIG. Togusa is now the team leader for Public Security Section 9, which has increased considerably in size. Section 9 deals with a series of complicated incidents, including the assassination of Ka Rum, a former dictator of the Siak Republic, which leads to a terrorist plot using children as vectors for a cybernetic virus. Investigations reveal that a hacker nicknamed "The Puppeteer" is behind the entire series of events.

The film, which had a production budget of 360 million yen, premiered in Japan on SKY PerfecTV! on September 1, 2006, and later aired in the United States on Sci-Fi Channel's Ani-Monday programming block on June 11, 2007. A stereoscopic 3D version of the film was released in 2011. The film received generally positive reviews, but was criticized for being dialogue-heavy and lacking in action.

== Plot ==
In 2034, two years after the events of 2nd GIG, Public Security Section 9 is investigating a string of mysterious suicides by refugees from the Siak Republic. Chief Aramaki conducts a raid to arrest the refugee dictator only to find him already dead. In retaliation, a Siak operative plans a terrorist attack with a micromachine virus. Batou is sent to intercept the Siak operative and unexpectedly encounters Motoko Kusanagi in the operative's facility; Kusanagi resigned from Section 9 two years ago and now conducts her own independent investigations into subjects of her choice. Before Batou can apprehend the Siak operative, he dies while attacking Kusanagi. Kusanagi takes a case of virus ampules and warns Batou to stay away from the Solid State Society before leaving.

Section 9 operatives develop a theory that a hacker known as the Puppeteer or 傀儡廻 (Kugutsumawashi, literally 'Puppet Spinner', contrasted with the original film Puppet Master who was 人形使い Ningyō-zukai, literally 'Doll Handler') is responsible for Siak agents' forced suicides. Togusa discovers sixteen kidnapped children who were intended carriers of the virus. All the children are listed as the offspring of Noble Rot Senior Citizens, infirm and wealthy elderly citizens who are cared for by automated nursing machines in their home; but the records appear to be falsified and the senior citizens are in fact childless. Section 9 begins to suspect a larger conspiracy when they find evidence of 20,000 missing children in the records of the national health system.

Soon afterwards, the Puppeteer causes the disappearance of the sixteen children and Batou reveals to Togusa that he believes Kusanagi to be the Puppeteer. Section 9 next intercepts a Siak sniper that is targeting the supposed mastermind of Ka Rum's assassination. After his capture it is revealed the sniper's informant and his target are one and the same. The sniper says that the Puppeteer is a mechanism in the Solid State and cannot be killed.

Togusa tracks down one of the missing children, now assigned to an elderly man in the Noble Rot program who appears to be near death. As Togusa tries to take the child, the man awakens and demands the child be left with him as he had named the child as his sole heir. He would rather give his assets to a child off the street than have his assets turned over to the government upon his death. The man dies after warning Togusa not to interfere with the will of the Solid State.

Shortly after, Togusa is brainhacked by the Puppeteer, who forces him to drive to a cyberbrain implantation hospital with his daughter. He will then be made to sign up his daughter for cyberization, after which she will be taken from Togusa and their memories of each other erased. Togusa decides that it would be preferable to shoot himself rather than let his daughter be taken, but is saved by Kusanagi just as Batou also arrives. Kusanagi informs the two of them that the Puppeteer is a rhizome formed by the collective consciousness of the Noble Rot Senior Citizens when they were connected to the nursing machine network.

Kusanagi temporarily rejoins Section 9 and confirms that Ito Munei, an influential politician, was behind the assassination of General Ka Rum. She also confirms that Munei and other politicians are using it as a front for a brainwashing facility which will create an elite group of pure-blooded Japanese intended to take control of the country in the next generation and lead it into Munei's vision of a new Golden Age. Munei appears to believe the abductees are all orphans and professes ignorance of any infrastructure created for abducting children who still have parents.

A designer named Tateaki Koshiki steps forward, claiming he developed the Solid State system, and immediately shoots himself fatally. Kusanagi dives into his dying cyberbrain, but it is a trap allowing the Puppeteer to hack her cyberbrain. The Puppeteer reveals that he was formed from Kusanagi's unconscious desire to do good. The Solid State decided to eliminate Munei for interfering in its plans, though Section 9 prevented this from happening. "Koshiki" states his intention to move towards the creation of a new society as a vanishing mediator. Later, Batou tells a recovering Kusanagi that the real Tateaki Koshiki built the Solid State after he was hired by Munei, but that he died two years ago.

Kusanagi does not reveal that the Puppeteer was a fragment of herself, but it is implied that Batou knows this from overhearing her conversation during the dive. Batou states that the ultimate identity of the Puppeteer will remain unknown and the incident will be written off as a scandal. Kusanagi has tired of wandering the Net on her own, and it is suggested that she will rejoin Section 9.

== Cast ==
Character	Japanese	English
Motoko Kusanagi	Atsuko Tanaka	Mary Elizabeth McGlynn
Batou	Akio Ōtsuka	Richard Epcar
Togusa	Kōichi Yamadera	Crispin Freeman
Aramaki	Osamu Saka	William Frederick Knight
Ishikawa	Yutaka Nakano	Michael McCarty
Saito	Toru Okawa	Dave Wittenberg
Paz	Takashi Onozuka	Bob Buchholz
Borma	Taro Yamaguchi	Dean Wein

== Production ==
The film was initially hinted as a new anime project collaboration with Bandai Visuals and Production I.G. The film was officially announced by Production I.G at the 2006 Tokyo Anime Fair. Whether the film would be released theatrically, broadcast on television, or released direct-to-DVD was undecided at the time. The film had a production budget of 360 million yen (equivalent to US$4.3 million). It was produced in Hi-vision format and was made by the same staff that originally made the TV series.

The production team used a 3-D layout system to render the interior shots ahead separately and in advance. The art team was tasked to draw lighting boards to show the position of light sources in the scene to improve the overall quality of the animation. One of the themes in the series was "Motoko Kusanagi's rebirth". The team had a difficult time portraying Motoko Kusanagi and her return to Section 9. Kenji Kamiyama stated that he felt the characters have obtained "ghosts" of their own and that Kusanagi needed a convincing story in order to return to Section 9. Shotaro Suga noted that Kusanagi was more going back to her old self rather than showing the new strength she found when she left Section 9.

For the music, Yoko Kanno read the scripts of the film in order to compose music that would synchronize with each scene, rather than composing music ahead of time. Sound Director Kazuhiro Wakabayashi returned to provide music menus, which made up of 70% of the scores Yoko Kanno composed.

As part of the Nissan sponsorship, the movie features two concept cars designed by Nissan. Togusa drives a white Nissan Sport Concept sports hatchback, Aramaki and Ichikawa are seen travelling in the 7-seater Infiniti Kuraza that premiered at the 2005 New York International Auto Show and North American International Auto Show.

== Releases ==
The film debuted in Japan on SKY PerfecTV! on September 1, 2006. It premiered in North America at the 2007 New York Comic Con screening from February 23–25, and also featured in 2007's Fantasia Festival in Canada. The English version was released on July 3, 2007. The Limited Edition Steelbook contained an additional DVD containing various development interviews and videos and the Solid State Society Original Soundtrack CD. In July 2008, Solid State Society was released in Blu-ray alongside the two OVA The Laughing Man and Individual Eleven in Ghost in the Shell: S.A.C. Trilogy Box.

In November 2010, a stereoscopic 3D version was announced adding a new opening sequence. The 3D version was released in Tokyo's Shinjuku Wald 9 theater on March 26, 2011. The stereoscopic 3D version was released in both normal and deluxe edition on July 22, 2011. The normal version contains opening-day greetings by the staff and cast, film advertisements, and audio commentaries. The deluxe edition titled Ghost in the Shell: Stand Alone Complex Solid State Society -Another Dimension- is packaged in a Dennōka Box containing the film in Stereoscopic 3D all the content the normal edition along with three Tachikomatic Days shorts in 3D and one in 2D.

A novel adaptation titled Ghost in the Shell: S.A.C. Solid State Society (攻殻機動隊S.A.C. Solid State Society), written by Kenji Kamiyama and his understudy Yasunori Kasuga, was published by Kodansha and released on March 3, 2011. An optical camouflage camera app for iOS was released on September 2, 2011. A video game for the Xbox 360 Kinect was developed by Kayac to promote the 3D remake of the film.

== Reception ==
Christopher Monfette of IGN gave Solid State Society an "Impressive" score of 8.0 out of 10, stating that it was "A worthwhile watch". Carl Kimlinger of Anime News Network gave the film a "B" rating, calling it a "swift-moving futuristic crime film with some clever science-fiction twists and solid action" but criticizing it was "wordy, confusing and somewhat bloodless." The film earned a 1.4% rating when it aired in NTV on October 15, 2012.

Marcus Doidge of DVD Active gave it a 6/10 stating, "Solid State Society isn't as strong as the first and second season of the anime show but being one feature length story as opposed to lots of very cool and largely great individual episodes offers a more in depth and focused story for the most part and a happy return to the world of Ghost in the Shell". The film was awarded the Jury Prize at the 21st Digital Content Grand Prix. The DVD released ranked No. 1 on Oricon charts on November 23, 2006.

The 3D version ranked at No. 11 in the Japanese box office chart with a total of $285,268 from a total of nine theaters. The 3D version won the Movie award for The Japanese Committee of the International 3D Society.
