= List of Real Drive episodes =

Cover of the first DVD volume of Real Drive as released by VAP on August 27, 2008.

Real Drive is a 2008 anime TV series created by Production I.G and Masamune Shirow (the latter who is known for being the creator of the Ghost in the Shell franchise), produced in collaboration with broadcaster Nippon Television (NTV). The series revolves around an information network known as "The Metal", and the series centers on Masamichi Haru, a paraphelgic old man who was in a coma for 50 years after a test dive using Meta-Real technology went horribly wrong. After awakening from his coma, he starts searching for the "answer in the sea" with help from Metal diver Souta Aoi and his little sister Minamo, his old friend Eiichiro Kushima, and his android helper Holon.

Real Drive is produced by Production I.G under the directorship of Kazuhiro Furuhashi, with series composition by Junichi Fujisaku, music by Hideki Taniuchi and Yoshihisa Hirano, characters by Tetsuo Ueyama, and produced by Takeshi Wada (Production I.G), Toshio Nakatani (NTV), Yasuo Ueda (Vap), and Yousuke Kasahara. The series aired 26 episodes on NTV from April 8, 2008, to September 30, 2008, with subsequent broadcast runs on GyaO, Sapporo TV, Chūkyō Television Broadcasting, Animax, Fukuoka Broadcasting Corporation, YTV, TV. Shinshu, and Tochigi TV. Thirteen DVD compilation volumes, each containing two episodes, were released by VAP between August 27, 2008, and August 21, 2009, with four DVD "Collector's Boxes" released between August 27, 2009, and May 22, 2009. The Collector's Boxes includes three to four disks, each containing two episodes, along with other bonus material.

The episodes of Real Drive follow a naming scheme, with the translated title above the Japanese title and the English subtitle below, mostly pertaining to the central object or focus of the episode.

The opening theme for the series is "Wanderland" by 9mm Parabellum Bullet, while the series' ending theme is "Katahiza no Yogore" (片膝の汚れ; "Dirty Knee") by Last Alliance.

== Episode list ==
No.	Title	Directed by	Written by	Original release date
1	"Urashima Drive / island" Transliteration: "Urashima Doraibu" (Japanese: ウラシマドライブ)	Kazuhiro Furuhashi	Junichi Fujisaku	April 8, 2008
Construction of an artificial island is disrupted by an unexplained phenomenon known as "burning sea". Masamichi Haru is injured by burning sea during a test of early Meta-Real technology, leaving him comatose for fifty years. Now elderly and unable to walk, he still hopes to solve the mystery of burning sea. His friend Eichiro Kushima now hopes to use the Meta-Real, also known as the Metal, to research the burning sea phenomenon.
2	"Girl / impact" Transliteration: "Shōjo" (Japanese: 少女)	Nanako Shimazaki	Junichi Fujisaku	April 15, 2008
Aoi Minamo is hired to be Haru's assistant. When burning sea causes a power outage that threatens life support systems on the artificial island, Minamo rushes to the electrical substation, while Haru uses his cyberbrain to dive into the Metal Network.
3	"Re-dive / identity" Transliteration: "Ridaibu" (Japanese: リダイブ)	Toshiyuki Kawano	Junichi Fujisaku	April 22, 2008
Haru struggles to become proficient enough at Metal diving to help Kushima's research. During his final test, he experiences braindown.
4	"Atoll of Desire / inside" Transliteration: "Yokubō no Kanshō" (Japanese: 欲望の環礁)	Kōichi Hatsumi	Junichi Fujisaku	April 29, 2008
Haru has become an official investigator and is asked to dive into the Metal to rescue the consciousness of an Artificial Island shareholder who has experienced braindown.
5	"Sous Marin / item" Transliteration: "Sūmaran" (Japanese: スーマラン)	Toshiyuki Yahagi	Yasuyuki Mutō	May 6, 2008
Minamo searches for a pair of antique Sous-Marin sunglasses as a gift to congratulate Haru on becoming an official investigator. During the search, Minamo and Sota have a run-in with champion fighter Iron Schwartz.
6	"Love Letter / if..." Transliteration: "Rabu Retā" (Japanese: ラブ・レター)	Hideyo Yamamoto	Yasuyuki Mutō	May 13, 2008
Because of her lack of a cyberbrain to read online texts, Minamo must find a physical book for a book report. Her discovery reveals the true story of a lost love.
7	"Hand in Hand / i am a dog" Transliteration: "Te to Te de" (Japanese: 手と手で)	Hodaka Kuramoto	Midori Gotō	May 20, 2008
Minamo and Haru discover a dog whose consciousness was swapped with that of his owner. They hurry to find the owner's body before it becomes too late for them to switch them back.
8	"No Friend / ideal" Transliteration: "Nō Furendo" (Japanese: ノー・フレンド)	Nanako Shimazaki	Yoshiki Sakurai	May 26, 2008
Minamo and Sota investigate reports of ghost sightings at Minamo's school.
9	"Job / I/O"; Transliteration: "Shoku" (Japanese: 職)	Norihiro Naganuma	Junichi Fujisaku	June 3, 2008
Minamo and Sota's father shuts down the core server to minimize damage from a virus intrusion, putting his job on the line.
10	"The Supreme Speaker / intelligence" Transliteration: "Shikō no Hanashite" (Japanese: 至高の話手)	Masayuki Yoshihara	Yoshiki Sakurai	June 10, 2008
Those who contact a mysterious oracle in the Metal named Eliza end up with lost memories. During the investigation, Minamo realizes that Haru has been talking to none other than Eliza.
11	"Just Intonations / intent" Transliteration: "Junsei Ritsu" (Japanese: 純正律)	Kōichi Hatsumi	Masahiro Kawashima	June 17, 2008
Minamo tries to help violinist Ichinose, who has been discouraged ever since Kushima suddenly quit playing violin long ago.
12	"A Morning Without Light / image" Transliteration: "Hikari no nai Asa" (Japanese: 光のない朝)	Hiromitsu Hagiwara	Yasuyuki Mutō	June 24, 2008
Minamo meets Amy, a girl who has just received cybernetic eyes to cure her blindness, but learns that Amy is struggling to adjust to being able to see. Meanwhile, Haru is asked to investigate the disappearance of a highly sought-after artist in the Metal.
13	"Another Sea / intermission" Transliteration: "Mō Hitotsu no Umi" (Japanese: もうひとつの海)	Hideyo Yamamoto	Yasuyuki Mutō	July 1, 2008
Haru reminisces about his youth, from his parents' struggles with poverty that led to trouble with the yakuza, to his meeting a dolphin that inspired his fascination with the sea, and finally to his exploration of the ruins of his city, now underwater because of climate change, which led him to become a test diver for early Meta-Real experiments.
14	"Waves and Wind / information" Transliteration: "Nami to Kaze" (Japanese: 波と風)	So Hae-jin	Junichi Fujisaku	July 8, 2008
Minamo goes for a dive in the sea. This episode is a recap of the series so far.
15	"Food / imotare" Transliteration: "Shoku" (Japanese: 食)	Heo Jong	Midori Gotō	July 15, 2008
Haru investigates cyberbrain deterioration in a group of food connoisseurs.
16	"Clear Power / ism" Transliteration: "Tōmei na Chikara" (Japanese: 透明な力)	Toshiyuki Yahagi	Masahiro Kawashima	July 22, 2008
Sota tries to train enough to defeat Holon in battle. Meanwhile, Haru investigates a case of a female android being illegally used for prostitution.
17	"Home@Home / inherit" Transliteration: "Hōmu atto Hōmu" (Japanese: ホーム@ホーム)	Kōichi Hatsumi	Yoshiki Sakurai	July 29, 2008
Minamo's family comes to visit.
18	"Tjuta Forest / ion" Transliteration: "Juta no Mori" (Japanese: ジュタの森)	Hirokazu Hanai	Midori Gotō	August 5, 2008
Haru, Minamo, Sota, and Holon go to a distant jungle island to investigate a mysterious background noise in the Metal. All seems well until ionization in the rainforest disrupts Holon's cyberbrain.
19	"Returning Water Drops / ichor" Transliteration: "Meguru Shizuku" (Japanese: 巡る雫)	Nanako Shimazaki	Midori Gotō	August 12, 2008
Holon collapses, and the others attempt to complete their investigation without her help.
20	"With These Feet / identity" Transliteration: "Sono Ashi de" (Japanese: その足で)	Norihiro Naganuma	Yasuyuki Mutō	August 19, 2008
At the jungle island, Haru realized that he can learn to walk again, and he begins to practice in secret to avoid jeopardizing his job as a Metal diver. Meanwhile, Minamo gets tested for suitability to receive a cyberbrain.
21	"Eternity / infinity" Transliteration: "Eien" (Japanese: 永遠)	Heo Jong	Junichi Fujisaku	August 26, 2008
Following the success of weather particle experimentation, the Secretary-General and Jeni En want to install weather particle plants as soon as possible. Kushima is opposed to the plan, suspecting that the weather particles will cause complications that threaten the Artificial Island. Meanwhile, Sota goes on a date with Holon.
22	"Peaceful Death / immortal" Transliteration: "Shizuka naru Shi" (Japanese: 静かなる死)	Hideyo Yamamoto	Junichi Fujisaku	September 2, 2008
Kushima goes missing, and is later found without his cyberbrain. Brain death will occur within twelve hours, so Sota and Holon search for his cyberbrain while Haru searches the Metal for his consciousness. Meanwhile, with Kushima missing from the Trustee meeting, the Secretary-General has no choice but to approve Jeni En's motion to begin bringing the weather particle plants online.
23	"Human Commandments / individual" Transliteration: "Ningen Ritsu" (Japanese: 人間律)	Kōichi Hatsumi	Junichi Fujisaku	September 9, 2008
With help from the Secretary-General, Sota deciphers the clues to bringing Kushima's cyberbrain back online, but instead of Kushima, an emergency AI awakens. The AI explains Kushima's suspicion that the weather particles cause the burning sea phenomenon, convincing the Secretary-General to halt weather particle production until Kushima can prove his theory. However, Jeni En temporarily revokes the Secretary-General's authority with a vote of no confidence.
24	"Earth Commandments / inference" Transliteration: "Chikyū Ritsu" (Japanese: 地球律)	Yasuhiro Geshi	Yoshiki Sakurai	September 16, 2008
Sota breaks into the weather particle facility with help from Haru in the Metal, but before he can reach the control room where the weather particle launch can be halted, Sota must fight Jeni En.
25	"Last Dive / i^2 = -1"; Transliteration: "Rasuto Daibu" (Japanese: ラストダイブ)	Nanako Shimazaki	Junichi Fujisaku	September 23, 2008
After the spread of weather particles, drastic weather changes occur across the planet, and the burning sea phenomenon returns. Haru decides to use the experimental deep dive suit in an attempt to make contact with Kushima.
26	"Real Drive / i" Transliteration: "Riaru Doraibu" (Japanese: リアルドライブ)	Kazuhiro Furuhashi	Junichi Fujisaku	September 30, 2008
Haru makes contact with Eliza and receives Kushima's proof that the weather particles will cause worldwide disaster. Haru broadcasts the proof on the Metal, and the world's leaders quickly agree to shut down the Metal to kill the weather particle nanomachines. Kushima's consciousness then contacts Haru and explains that the ocean itself will replace the functionality of Metal via the salt water in the human body. Haru, restored to his younger self, is safely returned to the surface, where he reunites with Minamo.
