= Masamune Shirow =

Japanese manga artist (born 1961)

Masamune Shirow 士郎 正宗
- Born: Masanori Ota; November 23, 1961 (age 64) Kobe, Hyōgo Prefecture, Japan
- Areas: Manga artist, Designer
- Pseudonym: Shirou Masamune
- Notable works: Appleseed, Dominion, Ghost in the Shell
- Awards: Seiun Award (for Appleseed)

Masanori Ota (太田正典, Ōta Masanori; born November 23, 1961), better known by his pen name Masamune Shirow (士郎 正宗, Shirō Masamune), is a Japanese manga artist and designer for video games and anime productions. Shirow is best known for his award-winning debut work, Appleseed, and his widely known manga, Ghost in the Shell. Both series have been adapted into theatrical or television anime films, anime television series, OVA or ONA productions, and several video games. Ghost in the Shell was additionally adapted into a Hollywood live-action film. He is a key figure in the development of cyberpunk aesthetics and themes in Japan during the 1980s and 1990s.

In addition to his mainstream manga and design work, Shirow has produced erotic and hentai manga and illustrations since the 1990s, under his regular pen name, with numerous art books and a 2025 exhibition dedicated to this work. These share the same canon as his interconnected mainstream publications.

== Life and career ==
Born in Kobe, the capital of Hyōgo Prefecture, he studied oil painting at Osaka University of Arts. While in college, he developed an interest in manga, which led him to create his first completed work in 1983, Black Magic, published in the Doujinshi manga anthology Atlas. His sister, under the pen name Akimoto Rene (秋本ルネ), was also active in that magazine before her marriage. His work caught the eye of Seishinsha President Harumichi Aoki, who offered to publish him.

The result was the best-selling manga Appleseed, a densely plotted drama set in an ambiguous future. The story was a sensation and won the 1986 Seiun Award for Best Manga. Shirow began Dominion in 1985, followed it with the second volume of Appleseed and a professional reprint of Black Magic. In 1987, he wrote the script for the OVA adaptation Black Magic M-66. He drew its storyboards and co-directed the OVA with Hiroyuki Kitakubo, who handled the story layout and character designs based on Shirow's artwork. Two further volumes of Appleseed followed before Shirow began work on Ghost in the Shell in 1989. Orion came next in 1990, with its conclusion promising further tales. The remainder of the 1990s primarily saw a short-lived Dominion reboot and the beginning of his long-running series of art books with Intron Depot, both published in 1992, followed by the partially completed fifth volume of Appleseed and two more volumes of Ghost in the Shell. Shirow also participated in the production of the 1997 Ghost in the Shell video game, developed by Exact. He then largely paused his career as a writer-artist of mainstream manga, leaving many works unfinished. His work often explores the philosophical themes of cyberpunk, such as the nature of post-human existence, AI and the ethics of biotechnology, human-machine relations, multiculturalism, and globalism. His work has been cited as an influence on The Wachowskis and the development of the Matrix film series.

Masamune Shirow created two package illustrations, used as covers for both the VHS tapes and the two-part light novel adaptation, and one unused creature design for the 1996 two-part Landlock OVA. An unproduced video game was intended as the centerpiece of the project, but his limited contributions were instead used by the production company ORCA to promote the anime in Japan and North America. ORCA contracted him again to help create the girls with guns multimedia project Gundress, using familiar Shirow tropes and originally intended as a video game. He provided a setting and detailed character and mech designs for new versions of the Landmates first seen in Appleseed, but no story outline, leading the various creators to develop three different narratives with the same premise and Angel Arms cast. Akira Amasawa released a light novel trilogy under the Dengeki Bunko publishing imprint between 1998 and March 1999. A Japanese-Korean anime film, directed by Katsuyoshi Yatabe and distributed by Toei, was released in March 1999, while a tactical role-playing game/visual novel hybrid for the PlayStation, with a different voice cast to distinguish its setting, was published by Starfish in February 2000. The film caused significant controversy for its unprecedented amount of unfinished animation, leading to an apology notice and forms for attendees to receive a free VHS copy of the completed film. The audience was composed largely of bemused industry insiders, with some filming the unfinished work, while its Toei theater release prompted their labor federation to investigate. Four months later, 7000 free tapes were shipped once the film was completed. The film muddied the project's creation process further by changing the protagonist from the group's leader, Kei Yung, to the reformed terrorist Alisa Takakura in homage to La Femme Nikita, to Shirow's dismay, while the US distributor Media Blasters placed Shirow's name above the movie's title. The film's ¥400 million budget and prominent creators and distributor made Gundress a lasting byword for poor animation in Japan.

Shirow made his debut as an adult artist in 1998, providing covers and interior color art for the two-part Lovecraftian tentacle erotica novel Jashin Hunter (邪神ハンタ) by Makoto Izumi, published by Seishinsha. The story follows the simple-minded 14-year-old karate student Nanamori Sarah as she attempts to save her best friend Ayasami Manimi from sorcerers seeking to revive the Deep Ones. Nude fold-out posters were irregularly serialized in Young Magazine Uppers from 2002 until the magazine's closure in 2004, marking the beginning of his full-fledged foray into erotic art as a writer-artist. These scenarios were later remade and expanded into the ongoing hentai line Galgrease.

In 2002, Shirow provided plots for several episodes of season 1 of Ghost in the Shell: Stand Alone Complex, sketches of characters and mechanical designs (including the Tachikoma), and gave his approval to the scripts before production. Mamoru Oshii, the director of the first two Ghost in the Shell movies, took over this role for season 2 of the series. In 2007, he collaborated again with Production I.G to co-create the original concept for the anime television series Ghost Hound, Production I.G's 20th anniversary project. A further original collaboration with Production I.G began airing in April 2008, titled Real Drive.

Masamune Shirow found a regular home magazine for his hentai projects in 2010, after producing erotic work intermittently for a decade while struggling to secure regular publication. GOT committed to publishing his R18 work through the monthly Canopri (キャノプリ), which debuted in 2010. He remained a regular contributor until the magazine's dissolution in 2012, continuing through the interim Canopri comic mini and into its successful 2013 relaunch as the monthly Comic Anthurium (コミックアンスリウム). All magazines feature regular cover work and lead color pages by him, primarily debuting pin-ups or previewing W・Tails Cat and Greaseberries material.

Pandora in the Crimson Shell: Ghost Urn, based on a concept by Masamune Shirow and featuring designs and editorial contributions by Shirow in every tankobon volume, was written by Kōshi Rikudō and illustrated by Rikudō and Rin Hitotose, and was published from 2012 to 2024. The series was conceived as an effort to officially merge the already connected universes of Appleseed and Ghost in the Shell, with the long-stalled Glitch Witch envisioned as the second half of that story. Additional information about his world is revealed in material available only in the Japanese e-book edition, including CG artwork and further editorial material by Shirow. This material introduces Ronne (ロンヌ), a fusion of Motoko Kusanagi and P2501 (the Puppet Master), and continues Ghost in the Shell 2.0. According to the editor of Pandora in the Crimson Shell, the story had already been illustrated, but its publication was delayed for various reasons, resulting in Ronne's debut in Kōshi Rikudō's manga. W・Tails Cat Vol. 6 is set to fully depict these events, as stated in Shirow's commentary accompanying the Vol. 22 material.

In 2013, Shirow provided a plot as the basic idea for the alternate-universe origin-story OVA and television series Ghost in the Shell: Arise, but asked the staff to do what they wanted with it, remaining largely hands-off. This resulted in a smaller narrative contribution from him than in season 1 of Ghost in the Shell: Stand Alone Complex, although his supplied character and mechanical designs were followed more closely here. These contributions are shown in his editorial section in Pandora in the Crimson Shell, beginning with Vol. 3. Both unrelated projects ended up having unintentional crossover names, ideas, and designs, as Shirow was creating material for the launches of both at the same time, with Lieutenant Colonel Kurtz shifting from one project to the other. Unit 501 subsequently became part of Motoko Kusanagi's military history in Shirow's own canon, after appearing in the extra chapter of Vol. 23, having previously been hinted at in the editorials.

The Shirow Masamune Works Exhibition was held at Marui City Yokohama in July 2023, organized by GENCO, with cooperation from Seishinsha and MANGATRIX. It displayed selected illustrations from Intron Depot, notably including previously unpublished art from his unrealized projects. In 2025, the Setagaya Literary Museum in Tokyo held The Exhibition of the World of Shirow Masamune, his first large-scale exhibition, from April 12 to August 17 to commemorate the museum's 30th anniversary. The exhibition surveyed his manga and other work, including his current activities. It displayed original analog manuscripts and digital output alongside books and art materials from his personal collection, as well as comments from Shirow himself. The exhibition also featured collaborative art pieces by other artists, including CLAMP, Hiroyuki Kitakubo, Ilya Kuvshinov, Jiro Konami, Kazuto Nakazawa, Oh!great, Tsutomu Nihei, and Yu Nagaba. The adults-only exhibition Greaseberries & W・Tails Cat, showcasing his science fiction hentai universe, was subsequently held at Vanilla Gallery in Tokyo.

Nikkei Science, the Japanese edition of Scientific American, which Shirow has followed since 1974, published a special issue, The Science of SF: How to Create Masamune Shirow, in July 2026, edited by Shirow himself. It contains 27 reprinted articles selected by Shirow as sources of inspiration or subjects of particular interest, along with original artwork by Shirow and an extensive afterword. Its main topics include evolution, artificial intelligence, quantum mechanics, and religious philosophy.

Glitch Witch, written and character-designed by Shirow, with art by Naoki Azuma, finally began publication on Young Magazine Web in 2026 and continues the overarching P2501 plot as a parallel work to Ghost in the Shell, set in the United States.

== Bibliography ==
=== Manga ===
Appleseed (アップルシード, Appurushīdo) series:

1. Appleseed 1-4 (アップルシード, Appleseed) (1985-1989)
2. Appleseed Databook, or Appleseed ID (1990) A guidebook that includes Chapter 26, "Called Game".
3. Appleseed Hypernotes (1996) A guidebook containing mecha design material for Bounty Dog: Getsumen no Eve, notes on Orion, and chapters 1-4 of the unfinished fifth volume, Artemis's Arrow, first published in Comic Gaia in 1992.

Dominion (ドミニオン, Dominion) series:

1. Dominion (ドミニオン, Dominion) (1985-1986)
2. Dominion: Phantom of the Audience (1988) Short story.
3. Dominion Conflict One: No More Noise (ドミニオンC1コンフリクト, Dominion C1 Konfurikuto) (1992-1993) A reboot.

Ghost in the Shell (攻殻機動隊, Kōkaku Kidōtai) series:

1. Ghost in the Shell (攻殻機動隊, Kōkaku Kidōtai) (1989-1990)
2. Ghost in the Shell 1.5: Human-Error Processor (攻殻機動隊 HUMAN-ERROR PROCESSOR, Kōkaku Kidōtai Hyūman Erā Purosessā) (1991-1996)
3. Ghost in the Shell 2: Man-Machine Interface (攻殻機動隊 MAN-MACHINE INTERFACE, Kōkaku Kidōtai Manmashīn Intāfēsu) (1997)
- Pandora in the Crimson Shell: Ghost Urn 1-26 (紅殻のパンドラ, Kōkaku no Pandora) (2012-2024) Original story and designs, manga by Kōshi Rikudō, art by Kōshi Rikudō and Rin Hitotose.
- Glitch Witch (2026-) Story and designs, art by Naoki Azuma.

Stand-alones:

- Black Magic (ブラックマジック, Burakku Majikku) (1983)
- Gun Dancing (グン・ダンシング) (1986) and Pile Up (ピル・ウプ) (1987) Science fiction procedurals featuring protagonists resembling Deunan Knute's father and a young Briareos.
- Orion (仙術超攻殻オリオン, Senjutsu Chōkōkaku Orion) (1990-1991)
- Exon Depot (1992-1997) Consists of three short, wordless stories: Yamazakura, Judgement, and ARMS.
- Neuro Hard: Planet of the Bees, or Neuro Hard: Planet of the Wasps (NEURO HARD 蜂の惑星, Neuro Hard: Hachi no Wakusei) (1992-1994) An unfinished reference work intended as a setting for a far-future science fiction video game or manga.
- Dead Drive (2013-2015) An unfinished science fiction illustration series published in Newtype Ace and later on Seishinsha's website about biotechnology and artificial life in the future.
- Seven Traps (2013) An unfinished science fiction illustration series published in Monthly Young Magazine about a virtual war set in 2050.

=== Art books ===
A substantial amount of Shirow's art has been released in art book or poster book formats, partly due to his long career providing covers and illustrations for novels and design work for video games. The following list is divided into his commercial line, which can include nudity, and his Galgrease R18 hentai line.

- Black Magic M-66 Storyboards. Seishinsha. 1986. ISBN 4-915333-30-2. Storyboards by Masamune Shirow for the 1987-released Black Magic M-66 OVA.
- Black Magic M-66 Complete Data Sheets. Movic. 1987. ISBN 4-943966-09-8. Design and animation artwork for the OVA.
- Intron Depot 1. Seishinsha. 1992. ISBN 978-4-87892-011-0. Illustrations from Appleseed, Black Magic, Dominion, Ghost in the Shell, Orion, and the video game Toshi Tensou Keikaku: Eternal City, from 1981–1991.
- 3D Action Shooting Game for PlayStation: Ghost in the Shell Official Art Book. Kodansha. 1997. ISBN 978-4-06-319829-4. Design and animation artwork for the 1997 Ghost in the Shell game.
- Intron Depot 2: Blades. Seishinsha. 1998. ISBN 978-4-87892-156-8. Fantasy-themed illustrations from the OVA Landlock, the video games Lords of Thunder, Slime Shiyou! and Trinea, the tabletop RPGs Asura Fantasy and Shin Taimasenki, the trading card game Monster Collection, and other games and RPGs, as well as the novel Shin Taima Senki: Taima-kan Akagami Kyōya by Kōtarō Kotoda, from 1992-1998.
- Intron Depot 3: Ballistics. Seishinsha. 2003. ISBN 978-4-87892-264-0. Military science fiction-themed illustrations for the video games Appleseed: Oracle of Prometheus and Black Magic, as well as Starship Police from Comic Gum magazine and early Galhound art, from 1992-2002.
- Intron Depot 4: Bullets. Seishinsha. 2004. ISBN 978-4-87892-294-7. Character, robot, and vehicle designs for anime and video games, including Gundress, Project Horned Owl, and Yarudora Series Vol. 3: Sampaguita, as well as the unreleased video game Blue Ray and anime D, from 1995-1999.
- Pieces 1: Premium Gallery. Seishinsha. 2009. ISBN 978-4-87892-363-0. Illustrations from Dominion, a full reprint of Exon Depot, and a non-pornographic excerpt from Shirow's art for the novel series Jashin Hunter by Makoto Izumi. Notable for lacking any commentary.
- Kokin Toguihime Zowshi Shu [古今伽姫草子集]. Seishinsha. 2009. ISBN 978-4-87892-372-2. Illustrations based on Japanese folktales, including The Crab and the Monkey, Issun-bōshi, and Momotarō, with commentary by Masamune Shirow. Connected to the hentai Hellhound.
- Intron Depot 5: Battalion. Seishinsha. 2012. ISBN 978-4-87892-388-3. Game and animation designs, including Asura Fantasy, Fire Emblem: Shadow Dragon, and RF Online, as well as three unreleased projects: the anime J and the online games E and C, from 2001 to 2009.
- Intron Depot 6: Barb Wire 1. Seishinsha. 2013. ISBN 978-4-87892-393-7. Illustrations for the novel series Classical Fantasy Within by Sōji Shimada, covering Vols. 1-5, from 2007-2010.
- Intron Depot 7: Barb Wire 2. Seishinsha. 2013. ISBN 978-4-87892-394-4. Illustrations for the novel series Classical Fantasy Within by Sōji Shimada, covering Vols. 5-8, from 2007-2010.
- Pieces Gem 01: The Ghost in the Shell Data + α. Seishinsha. 2014. ISBN 978-4-87892-396-8. Old and new illustrations with Shirow’s commentary, including his involvement with Season 1 of Ghost in the Shell: Stand Alone Complex and development material for the related projects Dead Drive, Ghost Drive, Ghost Guard, Ghost Bounds, Ghost Urn (Pandora in the Crimson Shell), Grid Bias, and Seven Traps.
- Pieces Gem 02: Neuro Hard Bee Planet. Seishinsha. 2015. ISBN 978-4-87892-399-9. A full reprint of the incomplete Neuro Hard, with commentary by Masamune Shirow and previously unpublished artwork from Appleseed and Starship Police.
- Pieces Gem 03: Appleseed Drawings. Seishinsha. 2017. ISBN 978-4-87892-402-6. A collection of accidentally discovered rough drawings and preliminary artwork for the Appleseed manga.
- Intron Depot 8: Bomb Bay. Seishinsha. 2018. ISBN 978-4-87892-419-4. Illustrations for the Dominion anime and Dominion C1, the play-by-email RPG Network RPG: Senjutsu Chōkōkaku Orion, and cover and gravure illustrations from Comic Gum magazine, from 1992-2009.
- Intron Depot 9: Barrage Fire. Seishinsha. 2019. ISBN 978-4-87892-421-7. Illustrations for the mobile game Border Break Mobile: Gale Gun Front, the novel series Valeria File by Kōshū Tani, the SF poster series from NewType Ace, and other games, from 1998-2016.
- Intron Depot 10: Bloodbard. Seishinsha. 2020. ISBN 978-4-87892-429-3. Illustrations for the mobile games Bahamut Greed and Dark Summoner, the play-by-web RPG Sinn, and other projects, from 2004-2019.
- Intron Depot 11: Bailey Bridge. Seishinsha. 2021. ISBN 978-4-87892-435-4. Illustrations for novels, including Bukyo Gakuen by Fūki Sunaga, from 2012-2014.
- Intron Depot 12: Burnout Velocity. Seishinsha. 2024. ISBN 978-4-87892-442-2. Illustrations for the light novel series The Third Complete Edition by Ryo Hoshino, covering Vol. 1-2, from 2015.
- Intron Depot 13: Burnout Velocity 2. Seishinsha. 2025. ISBN 978-4-87892-444-6. Illustrations for the light novel series The Third Complete Edition by Ryo Hoshino, covering Vol. 3, from 2015-2016.
- Shirow Masamune Artworks in the Shell. Kodansha. 2025. ISBN 978-4-06-539901-9. Official art book for The Exhibition of The World of Shirow Masamune, collecting about 300 representative pages across his career.
- Intron Depot 14: Burnout Velocity 3. Seishinsha. 2026. ISBN 978-4-87892-447-7. Illustrations for the light novel series The Third Complete Edition by Ryo Hoshino, covering Vol. 4-5, from 2016.

=== Galgrease art books ===
Galgrease, published in Young Magazine Uppers from 2002-2004, is the collected name of several hentai manga and poster books by Shirow. The name comes from the fact that the omnisexual women depicted often look "greased". The first series of booklets included 12 installments each, set in the following settings:

- Wild Wet West (Wild West-themed)
- Hellhound (Horror-themed)
- Galhound (Military science fiction-themed)

The second series included another 12 installments in the following settings, plus three final Hellhound booklets and one Galhound booklet released thereafter:

- Wild Wet Quest (Treasure hunting-themed sequel to Wild Wet West)
- Hellcat (Pirate-themed)
- Galhound 2 (Military science fiction-themed sequel)

Shirow revisited these characters and settings after each regular series of poster booklets was released, providing the basis for the ongoing hentai series Pieces with rotating settings and the science fiction-oriented W・Tails Cat.

- Pieces 2: Phantom Cats. Seishinsha. 2010. ISBN 978-4-87892-375-3. Renamed from Galhound, with its scenarios extensively remade and expanded in W・Tails Cat Vols. 1-5.
- Pieces 3: Wild Wet Quest. Seishinsha. 2010. ISBN 978-4-87892-377-7. Quest for magical artifacts in the jungle, featuring 19-year-old university student Fara Liesel Orin.
- Pieces 4: Hellhound 01. Seishinsha. 2010. ISBN 978-4-87892-379-1. Supernatural martial-arts adventure set in Yomi, the land of the dead, featuring rookie kunoichi exorcist Shion Hyakkisho.
- Pieces 5: Hellhound 02. Seishinsha. 2011. ISBN 978-4-87892-384-5. Direct sequel.
- Pieces 6: Hellcat. Seishinsha. 2011. ISBN 978-4-87892-382-1. Pirate adventure connected to Wild Wet Quest, featuring the undead aristocrat Christabel P. Atamastus, who commands the ship Red Dolphin.
- Pieces 7: Hellhound 01 & 02 Miscellaneous Work + α [作業雑記＋α] (in Japanese). Seishinsha. 2011. ISBN 978-4-87892-384-5. Production and setting notes, additional material, and new story sequences in the second half.
- Pieces 8: Wild Wet West. Seishinsha. 2012. ISBN 978-4-87892-386-9. Weird West adventure set in the cyberworld Redland, featuring 17-year-old deputy sheriff Juliona Trans, a high-level AI who recurs in later works.
- Pieces 9: Kokon Otogizoshi Shu Hiden [古今伽姫草子集 秘伝] (in Japanese). Seishinsha. 2012. ISBN 978-4-87892-389-0. The conclusion of Hellhound, focused on princesses, female deities and folkloric yōkai.

Set in 2217, the W・Tails Cat line serves as the lead title for his erotic works, centering on the beautiful women of Mars Risk Management Technology B&S, who previously appeared in Pieces 2: Phantom Cats. The series takes its title from the protagonist's twin-tailed cat Abel. Cyril Brooklyn, the clumsy 18-year-old Irish analyst and protagonist, is the heiress to the Brooklyn Foundation, a weapons manufacturer aligned with Poseidon. Her brain underwent experimental digitalization at birth because her body could not support life. Her backstory is revealed in Pandora in the Crimson Shell: Ghost Urn Vol. 10, with her family subsequently joining the cast. The ensemble is rounded out by the Hispanic-Brazilian mechanic Anya Anion; the German-Swedish sniper Iris Hallett, who is close in age to Cyril; 20-year-old Japanese-American diving instructor Hayami Marina; and Gariona Ronne, a Russian-French drill instructor from the Hesperian military police. Gariona is the founder of the "Nekojarashi" group, the only exclusively lesbian member of the polyamorous unit, and has a younger sister, Sabina, who also recurs. In the Vol. 4 dust-jacket preface, Masamune Shirow states that his mainstream manga and hentai works share one continuity, with a reading order provided due to their increasing crossovers. Greaseberries subsequently developed as a school-themed spin-off, centered on Grace Blackberry, Lilynna Blueberry, and other “Berry” cyberspace avatars or aliases of characters from various works. Cyril Brooklyn again plays a leading role.

- W・Tails Cat 1. GOT. 2012. ISBN 978-4-86084-762-3. Military science fiction, featuring rookie analyst Cyril Brooklyn, aligned with Poseidon, who joins a PMC on Mars.
- W・Tails Cat 2. GOT. 2013. ISBN 978-4-86084-880-4. Focuses on her military and security training, including sniping and infiltration.
- Greaseberries 1. GOT. 2014. ISBN 978-4-86084-904-7. School-life side story to W・Tails Cat, focused on Grace Blackberry from Dead Drive and Lilynna Ayabe/Blueberry, both at school.
- Greaseberries 2. GOT. 2014. ISBN 978-4-86084-932-0. Focused on Madeline Grimberry (Cyril Brooklyn) infiltrating Devicea EEE Fairchild from Dead Drive while disguised as a maid and Lilynna Ayabe/Blueberry at school.
- W・Tails Cat 3. GOT. 2016. ISBN 978-4-86084-867-5. Focuses on the group's water-rescue and spy training.
- Greaseberries 3. GOT. 2018. ISBN 978-4-8148-0101-5. Focused on Cyril Brooklyn and medical-student sisters Himehisa and Hinahisa Takashima, all at school.
- Greaseberries 4. GOT. 2019. ISBN 978-4-8148-0182-4. Focused on Lilynna Ayabe/Blueberry at school, office worker Maya Nambe and Aliori Haberi playing VR games, and an isotope-fusion of Cyril Brooklyn and Lilynna Loganberry assaulted in cyberspace by the Solomon-class AI Belphegor. High-level AIs from various series make brief appearances.
- Greaseberries Rough. GOT. 2019. ISBN 978-4-8148-0216-6. Monochrome sketches, developmental and alternate art, and Shirow’s creative and setting notes.
- W・Tails Cat Rough. GOT. 2025. ISBN 978-4-8236-0855-1. Monochrome sketches, developmental and alternate art, and Shirow’s creative and setting notes.
- W・Tails Cat 4. GOT. 2025. ISBN 978-4-8236-0854-4. Features the group aboard a naval vessel during a military voyage. The ending introduces Ronne (ロンヌ), the primary fusion of Motoko Kusanagi and P2501.
- W・Tails Cat 5. GOT. 2026. ISBN 978-4-8236-1087-5. Focused on a corporate bicycle team race that is a ploy to kidnap an Earth princess, which Cyril accidentally foils.

=== Dōjinshi ===
- Areopagus Arthe (1980), published in ATLAS
- Yellow Hawk (1981), published in ATLAS
- Colosseum Pick (1982), published in Funya
- Pursuit (1982), published in Kintalion
- Optional Orientation (1984), published in ATLAS
- Battle on Mechanism (1984), published in ATLAS
- Metamorphosis in Amazoness (1984), published in ATLAS
- Arice in Jargon (1984), published in ATLAS
- Bike Nut (1985), published in Dorothy
- Colosseum Pick (1990), published in Comic Fusion Atpas

=== Other ===
- Design of the MAPP1-SM mouse series (2002, commissioned by Elecom)
- Design of the EHP-SH1000 and EHP-SL100 headphones (2016, commissioned by Elecom)

== Adaptations ==
=== Anime ===
==== Film ====
- Ghost in the Shell (1995) by Mamoru Oshii (based on selected chapters from Vol. 1)
- Ghost in the Shell 2: Innocence (2004) by Mamoru Oshii (based on the chapter Robot Rondo from Vol. 1)
- Appleseed (2004) by Shinji Aramaki
- Ghost in the Shell: Stand Alone Complex – Solid State Society (2006) by Kenji Kamiyama
- Appleseed Ex Machina (2007) by Shinji Aramaki and John Woo
- Appleseed Alpha (2014) by Shinji Aramaki and Joseph Chou
- Pandora in the Crimson Shell: Ghost Urn (2015) by Munenori Nawa
- Ghost in the Shell: The New Movie (2016) by Kazuya Nomura

==== OVAs and ONAs ====
- Black Magic M-66 (1987) by Hiroyuki Kitakubo and Masamune Shirow (based on the chapter "Booby Trap", the only adaptation with Shirow in a principal creative role)
- Appleseed (1988) by Kazuyoshi Katayama
- Dominion Tank Police (1988) by Takaaki Ishiyama and Kôichi Mashimo (prequel to the original manga)
- New Dominion Tank Police (1990) by Noboru Furuse and Junichi Sakai (sequel to the original manga)
- Bounty Dog: Getsumen no Eve (1994) by Hiroshi Negishi (mechanical design cooperation)
- Landlock (1995) by Yasuhiro Matsumura (original character design)
- Gundress (1999) by Katsuyoshi Yatabe (character, mecha, and setting design)
- Tank S.W.A.T. 01 (2006) by Romanov Higa (based on the setting of Dominion Conflict One: No More Noise)
- W・Tails Cat: A Strange Presence (2013)
- Ghost in the Shell: Arise (2013) by Kazuchika Kise (provided setting, character, and mechanical design concepts)
- Ghost in the Shell: SAC_2045 (2020) by Shinji Aramaki and Kenji Kamiyama

==== Television ====
- Ghost in the Shell: Stand Alone Complex (2002-2003) by Kenji Kamiyama (provided plots for several episodes, character sketches, and mechanical designs)
- Ghost in the Shell: S.A.C. 2nd GIG (2004-2005) by Kenji Kamiyama (Mamoru Oshii took over from Masamune Shirow as supervisor)
- Ghost Hound (2007-2008) by Ryūtarō Nakamura (original concept in collaboration with Production I.G)
- Real Drive (2008) by Kazuhiro Furuhashi (original concept in collaboration with Production I.G)
- Appleseed XIII (2011-2012) by Takayuki Hamana (original character design)
- Ghost in the Shell: Arise – Alternative Architecture (2015) by Kazuchika Kise
- Pandora in the Crimson Shell: Ghost Urn (2016) by Munenori Nawa (based on Vol. 1 through Vol. 8, Chapter 30)
- The Ghost in the Shell (2026) by Mokochan (full adaptation of Vol. 1)

=== Live-action ===
- Appleseed Special Prologue (1988) by Gainax (three-minute commercial with an attached making-of)
- Ghost in the Shell (2017) by Rupert Sanders

=== Manga and comics ===
- Ghost Hound: Another Side (2007-2008, 2 volumes) by Production I.G and Masamune Shirow (original work), Kanata Asahi (manga)
- Real Drive (2008-2009, 2 volumes) by Production I.G and Masamune Shirow (original work), Momotarou Miyano (manga)
- Intuitive Girl ☆ Minamo ~RD Real Drive~ (2008, 2 volumes) by Production I.G and Masamune Shirow (original work), Hiroyasu Yoshikawa (manga)
- Ghost in the Shell: Stand Alone Complex (2009-2012, 5 volumes) by Yu Kinutani (manga)
- Ghost in the Shell: S.A.C. Tachikoma Days (2009-2014, 8 volumes) by Yoshiki Sakurai (story), Masayuki Yamamoto (manga)
- Appleseed XIII (2011-2013, 3 volumes) by Akira Miyagawa
- Ghost in the Shell: Arise – Sleepless Eye (2013-2016, 7 volumes) by Junichi Fujisaku (story) and Takumi Oyama (art)
- Ghost in the Shell: Stand Alone Complex – The Laughing Man (2013-2016, 4 volumes) by Yu Kinutani
- Appleseed Alpha (2014-2016, 2 volumes) by Iou Kuroda
- Black Magic: Ghost Drive (2016-2017, 2 volumes) by Masamune Shirow (original work), Tomomasa Takuma (manga)
- Ghost in the Shell: Comic Tribute (2017) by Masamune Shirow (original work), Yu Kinutani, Boichi, Tomonori Inoue, Masayuki Yamamoto, Yu Imai, Nokuto Koike, Nobuaki Tadano, Takumi Oyama and Tony Takezaki (manga), Akira Hiramoto (poster)
- The Ghost in the Shell: Global Neural Network (2018) by Max Gladstone and David López (Automatic Behavior), Alex de Campi and Giannis Milonogiannis (Redbloods), Genevieve Valentine and Brent Schoonover (After the Ball Is Over), and Brenden Fletcher and LRNZ (Star Gardens)
- The Ghost in the Shell: The Human Algorithm (2019-2025, 8 volumes) by Junichi Fujisaku (story) and Yuki Yoshimoto (art) (continuation of the world of Ghost in the Shell 1.5)

=== Novels ===
- Special Investigation Tank Squad Dominion (1994, 2 volumes) by Nemuruanzu (novelization of the second OVA series based on the setting of the original manga)
- Ghost in the Shell: Burning City (1995) by Akinori Endo (original story based on the setting of the manga)
- Ghost in the Shell 2: Star Seed (1998) by Akinori Endo (original story based on the setting of the manga)
- Gundress (1998-1999, 3 volumes) by Akira Amasawa (original story based on the Gundress setting)
- Gundress: The Movie (1999) by Shinjiro Hori
- Ghost in the Shell: Stand Alone Complex: The Lost Memory (2004) by Junichi Fujisaku
- Innocence: After the Long Goodbye (2004) by Masaki Yamada
- Ghost in the Shell: Stand Alone Complex: Revenge of the Cold Machines (2004) by Junichi Fujisaku
- Ghost in the Shell: Stand Alone Complex: White Maze (2005) by Junichi Fujisaku
- Black Magic (2007-2008, 3 volumes) by Hideki Kakinuma (original story and reboot of the setting of the manga)
- Ex Machina (2007) by Kiyoto Takeuchi
- Olympus Eye: Appleseed Gaiden 1 (2007) by Kan Ootake (original story based on the setting of the manga)
- Real Drive (2008) by Yoshinobu Akita (prequel to the anime setting)
- Ghost in the Shell: Stand Alone Complex: Solid State Society (2011) by Kenji Kamiyama and Yasunori Kasuga
- Ghost in the Shell: Stand Alone Complex: Section-9 (2012) by Kenji Kamiyama and Yasunori Kasuga
- Appleseed XIII (2012) by Keiki Sakurai
- The Ghost in the Shell: Five New Short Stories (2017) by Tō Enjō ("Shadow.net"), Gakuto Mikumo ("Heterochromia"), Kafka Asagiri ("Soft and White"), Yoshinobu Akita ("Soliloquy"), and Tow Ubukata ("Springer")
- Ghost in the Shell: The Official Movie Novelization (2017) by James Swallow and Abbie Bernstein

=== Video games ===
Masamune Shirow contributed art and designs to a variety of TTRPG, PBM game, and social game publications from 1988 onward. The following is a list of home console and PC games on which he worked directly or that are based on his source material.

==== PC Engine ====
- Toshi Tensou Keikaku: Eternal City (1991) Action platformer, Designs featured in Intron Depot 1
- Lords of Thunder (1993) Scrolling shooter, Designs featured in Intron Depot 2

==== Super Famicom ====
- Appleseed: Oracle of Prometheus (1994) Action platformer, Designs featured in Intron Depot 3 (based on the setting of the manga)
- Trinea (1993) Action RPG, Designs featured in Intron Depot 2

==== Nintendo DS ====
- Fire Emblem: Shadow Dragon (2008) Strategy RPG, Designs featured in Intron Depot 5

==== PlayStation ====
- Project Horned Owl (1995) Light gun shooter, Designs featured in Intron Depot 4
- Slime Shiyou! (1996) Simulation, Designs featured in Intron Depot 2
- Ghost in the Shell (1997) Third-person shooter, Designs featured in 3D Action Shooting Game for Playstation: Ghost in the Shell Official Art Book (based on the setting of the manga)
- Yarudora Series Vol. 3: Sampaguita (1998) Graphic adventure, Designs featured in Intron Depot 4
- Gundress (2000) Strategy RPG, Designs featured in Intron Depot 4

==== PlayStation 2 ====
- Ghost in the Shell: Stand Alone Complex (2004) Third-person shooter
- Appleseed EX (2007) Third-person shooter

==== PlayStation Portable ====
- Yarudora Series Vol. 3: Sampaguita (2005) Graphic adventure, remaster of the PlayStation game
- Ghost in the Shell: Stand Alone Complex (2005) First-person shooter

==== Microsoft Windows ====
- Black Magic (1997) Strategy RPG, Designs featured in Intron Depot 3
- Aoki Uru Combat Flight Simulator Plane And Mission Module add-on for Microsoft Combat Flight Simulator (2000) Combat flight simulator, Plane design
- RF Online (2006) MMORPG, Designs featured in Intron Depot 5
- W・Tails Cat DELUSION WORLD Vol. 1 (2013) Hentai
- Ghost in the Shell: Stand Alone Complex - First Assault Online (2017) Online first-person shooter
