= Intron Depot 1 =

Manga by Masamune Shirow

- Genre: Fantasy, Cyberpunk
- Manga
- Written by: Masamune Shirow
- Published by: Seishinsha
- Published: July 17, 1992

Intron Depot 1 (イントロンデポ) is a collection of Masamune Shirow's full color works published in 1992 by Seishinsha. The volume itself is 148 210 mm x 285 mm pages. It encompasses 226 illustrations from 1981 to 1991, 193 of which are in full color. It is a wide-ranging collection, as one might expect from a work surveying 10 years of a professional artist's life. The foreword written by Masamune Shirow indicates that only a small sample of works is not represented, some works done for fanzines, or sent off to other individuals, and 34 color pages were left out from Ghost in the Shell because he felt that might devalue that work. Everything from Appleseed to Orion are well represented in Intron Depot 1, some pictures are reproductions of paintings, others book covers, manga pages, or drafts. One feature of Intron Depot 1 is that all of the works are presented with a small aside from Shirow as to his thoughts on them. Another is that he includes a number of what he considers to be his mistakes, and is generally very critical of his work over all. In July 2023, Intron Depot was put on exhibition in Yokohoma.

The commentary itself is somewhat whimsical in tone. It might present some seed of inspiration for an image, critique, or ponder the functionality of a pictured object, or provide some perspective on technique, story, or history associated with the work.

Intron Depot 1 in two spots in particular is quite graphic. One panel involves a graphic drawing of a lesbian ménage à trois, and another significant gore. On balance it is a collection of guns, swords, girls, gadgets, cyborgs, and mecha.

== Chapters ==
1. Poster (3)
2. Contents (2)
3. Appleseed (43)
4. Black Magic (10)
5. Black Magic M-66 (10)
6. Game & Etc. (15)
7. Ghost in the Shell (39)
8. Dominion (19)
9. Cover & Etc. (34)
10. Orion (17)
11. Monochrome (14)
