= Bullet Witch =

2006 video game

- North American cover art, featuring main protagonist Alicia Claus
- Developers: Cavia; Marvelous (PC)
- Publishers: JP: AQ Interactive; WW: Atari Europe; WW: Xseed Games (PC)
- Director: Yōichi Take
- Producer: Toru Takahashi
- Designer: Masayuki Suzuki
- Programmer: Shinya Abe
- Artists: Satoshi Ueda; Taro Hasegawa
- Writers: Yōichi Take; Akira Yasui
- Composer: Masashi Yano
- Platforms: Xbox 360; Microsoft Windows
- Release: Xbox 360: JP: July 27, 2006; NA: February 27, 2007; EU: March 9, 2007; AU: March 16, 2007; Microsoft Windows: WW: April 25, 2018
- Genre: Third-person shooter
- Mode: Single-player

Bullet Witch (Japanese: バレットウィッチ, Hepburn: Baretto Uicchi) is a third-person shooter developed by Cavia for the Xbox 360 and Microsoft Windows. It was released in Japan in 2006 and in Western regions in 2007; AQ Interactive published the game in Japan, while Atari Europe was the publisher for other regions. A Windows version was released by Xseed Games in April 2018. Set on a post-apocalyptic Earth, the story follows the witch Alicia Claus as she hunts a powerful demon. Players control Alicia through linear levels, using her gun to fire multiple types of ammunition at humanoid and demonic enemies.

Beginning development in 2004 as Cavia's first game for seventh generation consoles, Bullet Witch was developed by the same team behind Ghost in the Shell: Stand Alone Complex. The character and monster designs, created respectively by Satoshi Ueda and Taro Hasegawa, fused Western and Japanese sensibilities. The music was composed by Masashi Yano supervised by Nobuyoshi Sano. The game received mixed to negative reviews from Japanese and Western critics.

== Gameplay ==
Gameplay in Bullet Witch; Alicia advances through a level as part of the environment explodes in front of her.

Bullet Witch is a third-person shooter where players control the witch Alicia and her unseen companion "Darkness" while navigating a three-dimensional post-apocalyptic world. The game's six levels are divided into semi-open environments, ranging from urban to country settings. Environments include destructible objects and combustibles that generate explosions when damaged. At the beginning of each level Alicia is assigned a variety of abilities and weapon attributes. Alicia has a health meter and magic meter, both of which automatically regenerate over time. Restorative items to speed up regeneration can also be received from non-playable characters (NPCs) Alicia saves from attack.

Combat is primarily based around using Alicia's "gun rod" weapon and magic abilities against normal enemies and during scripted boss battles. While Alicia mainly fights alone, she is joined by NPCs for later major battles. Her gun rod transforms into multiple types of guns, each with different ammunition types, firing rates and damage. When the game starts Alicia only has access to the rod's machine gun mode, but skill points acquired after completing levels can be used to unlock shotgun, canon, and Gatling gun modes. Reloading after a magazine is exhausted costs Alicia magic points. Each gun type can be augmented with additional functions or deal higher damage by using magic. Alicia can also perform a melee attack when close to enemies.

Alicia has access to magic spells, which are assigned to three rings based on their strength. Basic spells include creating a temporary shield, imbuing ammunition with elemental damage abilities, and spearing enemies from beneath; second level spells include throwing objects, summoning a hoard of ravens to attack enemies, and giving up a portion of health to revive injured allies and non-playable characters; the third level summons powerful natural phenomena such as tornadoes, meteor showers and lightning storms to destroy large groups of enemies. Using spells cost varying amounts of magic points depending on their level, and each can be upgraded using skill points. Upgrades to health, guns and magic are unlocked with skill points earned based on a ranking, which takes in damage taken, enemies killed and the length of time it took to complete a level.

== Synopsis ==
In the wake of multiple natural disasters culminating in a demon invasion in 2007, Earth has become a wasteland, and by the year 2013 humanity is on the brink of extinction. Alicia Claus, a witch guided by a demonic power dubbed the "Darkness", enters a near-deserted American city. Despite the Darkness saying the city is doomed, Alicia helps the survivors and ends up helping local resistance forces led by Maxwell Cougar evacuate survivors. During her time there, she and the resistance are forced to flee from Omega—a powerful demon immune to magic and gunfire—and Maxwell asks for her aid in saving humanity. While they work together, Maxwell gives Alicia a journal fragment revealing that an archeologist performed a ritual to revive a loved one after she died in a plane crash—his actions opened a portal allowing the demons to attack humanity.

Alicia accompanies the resistance forces to the location of the portal, aiding them and further survivors along the way. When she reaches the portal's location, she discovered the archeologist still alive as a prisoner of the portal. Receiving the remaining journal entries from him, Alicia discovers that she herself is the archeologist's daughter and is only alive and able to wield magic due to his actions. Alicia is forced to kill her father to close the portal, although the remaining demons still control Earth. Alicia and Maxwell return to the city and finally defeat Omega through their combined strength, liberating the city from demon control. Despite this victory, the battle is far from over, and despite Maxwell's growing attachment to her, Alicia decides to continue her mission. Newspaper articles during the credits show humanity defeating the demons and recovering from the natural disasters while Alicia continues wandering the world.

== Development ==
Development of Bullet Witch lasted approximately two years, being handled by the same team who developed Ghost in the Shell: Stand Alone Complex for the PlayStation 2. It was the first game developed for seventh generation consoles by Cavia. The concept for Bullet Witch originated before the next generation of hardware had been revealed to developers, beginning its concept development for sixth generation hardware. After the developers were shown the Xbox 360, they were impressed with its development tools and additional features such as the Xbox Live functions, deciding to develop Bullet Witch for that platform. While development for the PlayStation 3 was considered, the team had begun work on the Xbox 360, and decided to stay on a single platform to deliver the best possible experience. The game used both internal and external staff, with a team size estimated at being between 100 and 120 people. Between 20 and 30 programmers worked on the game.

The game was produced by Toru Takahashi. The director was Yōichi Take, who co-wrote the scenario with Akira Yasui. According to Take, the scenario had a somber tone to suit its setting, and was quite brief when compared to other video game narratives. The character of Alicia was described as a combination of Japanese and Western character archetypes; while her Gothic witch appearance drew from Western fiction, her melancholy persona and ironic humor were based in Japanese traditions. The character designs and art direction were handled by Satoshi Ueda. The menus and other 2D assets were designed by Satoko Tsushima. Tsushima also designed the game's logo. The in-game cinematics were directed by Yasui, with the higher graphical power of the console enabling more character expression than in Yasui's previous work. The creature designs were handled by Taro Hasegawa. One monster he described in detail was the humanoid Geist, which he needed to redesign several times; his first draft was refused due to being overly complex to render, with later versions being created with input from other staff members. The larger monsters dubbed Megas were designed around the concept of players jumping on them during battle, but due to hardware limitations this aspect of gameplay was cut. The game's monsters, like Alicia, were a fusion of Western and Japanese design elements. Fuji Wahara was in charge of character motion, and worked hard to make character movements realistic while keeping to the exaggerated tone and style of the game. The lead artificial intelligence designer was Tomoyuki Ando.

When creating Bullet Witch, the team were pleased with the shift to high-definition graphics, but this and the game's identity as a new intellectual property meant they were taking financial risks. The move to next-generation hardware meant the team could include more destructible environments. They used 64-bit computing at a few points to speed up data exchange and improve visual effects. The game uses the NovodeX physics engine, which later known as PhysX. Working with the next-generation hardware was both exhilarating and difficult, as the team wanted to create something new rather than rely on existing code resources. The team wanted players to be able to navigate large areas with few or no loading screens, but these ambitions were originally muted by the console's limited power, and it was only during the later stages of development that they started resolving the issues. Due to the console's limitations, some potential effects and touches such as breaking glass, bullet marks in surfaces like building walls, and having Alicia's feet adjust to the slope of terrain had to be left out to increase processing power for the large-scale environments. While the team had wanted to achieve 60 frames per second, the team needed to reduce the framerate to 30 per second so all the effects would run smoothly.

=== Music ===
The music for Bullet Witch was composed by Masashi Yano, then part of music studio SuperSweep. Yano had previously written the score for the CGI cutscenes of Drakengard 2. The soundtrack was a collaboration between internal and external staff. As the visuals were designed to appear cinematic, the developers wanted the music to emulate that atmosphere. Cavia staff were responsible for deciding upon the music with the external staff, who then composed the music. The music was supervised by Cavia staff member Nobuyoshi Sano, mixed by Delfi Sound's Toshihiro Hayano, and mastered by Masami Kanda of Memory-Tech Corporation. When brought on board the project, Sano asked for Yano, whose musical style emulated Hollywood orchestral scores.

Yano and Sano were originally going to work on the score together, with Yano handling the orchestral segments and Sano in charge of percussion and bass. Take wanted the soundtrack to stand out, but when Sano added together their two styles of music, he negatively compared the result to a song from Japanese variety show Nanikore Chin Hyakkei. Sano was so distressed that he insisted Yano handle all aspects of the music. The soundtrack and soundscape were created using 5.1 surround sound, which Sano found to be a mixed experience. While this enabled a wider range and depth of sounds, it also made coordination and balance more difficult. Despite the difficulties, he found the resultant effect superior to the two-channel sound of his previous projects. The theme song "The Vanishing Sky" was composed by Yano and arranged by Sano, with lyrics and vocals performed in English by Asako Yoshihiro.

== Release ==
Bullet Witch was first announced in December 2005 in a special event held by its Japanese publisher AQ Interactive. Originally scheduled for release on July 13, 2006, the game was pushed forward by several weeks. The game was eventually released on July 27. It was later re-released as part of the Japanese "Xbox 360 Platinum Collection" on June 14, 2007.

Following the game's Japanese release, Atari successfully pitched to publish the game outside Japan. According to Atari, the game was chosen for localization due to its unique premise, in addition to showcasing the capacities of next generation gaming hardware. In addition to localizing the game, Atari worked to improve the gameplay experience for Western players, adjusting the camera and character controls for a tighter experience, and improving enemy artificial intelligence. Another element that underwent adjustments was the Gun Rod, which was seen as overpowered in the Japanese version. The game was released in North America on February 27, 2007. In Europe, the game released on March 9, and in Australia it released on March 16.

A Microsoft Windows port was released on April 25, 2018. It was developed by Marvelous and published by Xseed Games.

== Reception ==
Reception

Aggregate score
Aggregator	Score
Metacritic	(X360) 55/100 (PC) 51/100

Review scores
Publication	Score
Eurogamer	6/10
Famitsu	27/40
Game Informer	6.5/10
GamePro	1.5/5
GameSpot	5.5/10
IGN	4/10
Official Xbox Magazine (US)	4/10
VideoGamer.com	6/10

Review aggregate site Metacritic was given a score of 55 out of 100 based on 59 critic reviews, indicating "mixed or average" reviews. Japanese gaming magazine Famitsu praised the atmosphere and spectacle, but noted difficulties during combat and handling the camera. Eurogamer's Oli Welsh negatively referred to the game as "Japanese fetish gaming in full effect", being satisfied with the gunplay and magic systems but finding most other aspects either poorly designed or lacking substance. GamePro was highly critical, faulting almost every aspect of the game's design, feeling that there was nothing good about the game and that it was not worth buying despite a promising premise. Joe Juba of Game Informer felt that the game had potential and praised the enemy designs, but its poor execution held the game back from being a fully enjoyable experience.

Greg Mueller, writing for GameSpot, praised the destructible environments and spell casting while faulting most other aspects of the game—he concluded that "Bullet Witch shows promise, but it ultimately fails to deliver anything more than a [forgettable] ho-hum third-person shooter". IGN's Erik Brudvig was unimpressed by most aspects of the game and highly critical of the gameplay and lack of content, calling it "short and shallow". Lewis Cameron of Official Xbox Magazine found the gameplay dull and repetitive despite liking the variety of attack options, and faulted most other aspects including the graphics and localization. VideoGamer.com's Will Freeman enjoyed the magic system and later levels, but criticized the graphics and its "basic" content.

=== Sales ===
During its debut week in Japan, Bullet Witch reached 21st place in gaming charts with sales of 9,083 units, being the best-selling Xbox 360 title that week. By December 2007, combined sales of the original release and Xbox 360 Platinum Collection re-release totaled 27,098 units. In the United Kingdom, Bullet Witch failed to register the general gaming charts, but was seventh in the Xbox 360 charts.
