= Beat Down: Fists of Vengeance =

2005 video game

- Developer: Cavia
- Publisher: Capcom
- Directors: Yasuhiro Seto; Nobuhiko Ikeuchi
- Producers: Hironobu Takeshita; Makoto Oshitani
- Engine: RenderWare
- Platforms: PlayStation 2, Xbox
- Release: NA: August 23, 2005; PAL: September 30, 2005; JP: November 2, 2005
- Genres: Action role-playing, beat 'em up
- Mode: Single-player

Beat Down: Fists of Vengeance, known in Japan as Beat Down (ビートダウン, Bīto Daun), is a beat 'em up action role-playing game for the PlayStation 2 and Xbox. It was developed by Cavia and published by Capcom, and released in 2005. In it, the player takes the role of any of 5 gangsters, having been betrayed by their boss and scattered across the city. The player earns respect on the street by fighting enemies to take down a shadowy organization and gain control of Los Sombras. The player also has complete control of team-building and can free-roam for most of the game.

== Gameplay ==
There are numerous moves that the player can use to beat their enemies including hand-to-hand combat, melee weapon combat and in the later stages of the game firearms such as pistols and shotguns. Powerful combination moves (referred to in-game as "combos") can be learned from a variety of NPCs in exchange for cash or upon reaching a certain skill level. During the course of the game, players can buy clothes or undergo plastic surgery to disguise themselves and evade the rival gangsters and police who pursue them. There is also a rating system based on three attributes: Cash Flow (including items), Leadership (gang size and respect) and Charisma (negotiating skill). These can all be altered by player's choices and have an effect on the ending received.

Aside from the fighting aspect of the game, there is also Negotiation system that can be accessed with most NPCs during a fight or casual conversation. For recruitable NPCs, there are five main negotiation options that are available to the player, and have varying outcomes depending on the specific circumstances they are used in. If in a fight, the enemy must be worn down sufficiently before negotiation can be successful. This is aided by using weapons, taunts and when the foe is low on health.

- Recruit: This proposition can be used both in normal interaction and during a fight. If successful, the targeted NPC will be added to the player's crew and can be brought on missions and used to unlock minigames depending on their skills. Outside of a fight, it may prompt a NPC to attack the player, thus instigating a fight.
- Rob: Outside of a fight, this consists of the player asking or swindling the NPC, though like recruiting it can be rejected by the NPC and instigate a fight. While NPCs cannot negotiate with the player, there are times the player can be robbed, such as when purchasing fake medicine on the black market dealers around Los Sombras.
- Interrogate: This option consists of the player asking for information, and it can be used to find out about sales at local stores, job opportunities, and gameplay tips along with story-specific information, depending on the NPC targeted.
- BeatDown: This can only be seen and used when in a one-on-one fight with a non-boss NPC, and consists of the player viciously beating the NPC to death in a special cut-scene. This removes the NPC for the remainder of the game and allows the player to take any items on the NPC's body. By doing this, the player risks attracting police attention and the police alertness level will quickly rise until the player leaves that neighborhood.
- Cancel: This option simply ends the negotiation, including with NPCs who are hostile to the player, and can be used as a means of avoiding confrontation.

There are three game modes:

- Story Mode - The main story mode of the game, divided into chapters. It is the only game mode which allows one to save their progress, and can be replayed multiple times in order to unlock new characters, moves and items. Certain endings and plot arcs can only be attained after multiple playthroughs with different characters.
- Vs Mode Normal - This mode can only be played by loading a saved game file and using the characters on has unlocked. It allows the player to fight another player or the CPU with a team of up to three fighters each. The roster available depends on who the player has recruited in their particular save-file.
- Vs Mode Custom - Similar to the other Versus mode, except that custom player characters can be added to the game with the same weapons, items and skills unlocked in story mode.

== Plot ==
The player assumes the role of one of the five underworld enforcers: Raven, Jason G, Aaron, Gina or Lola. When they witnessed the dead bodies of the drug dealers in the warehouse as taking part of the drug dealing for money, they were betrayed by Las Sombras' powerful Mafia family led by Zanetti. The player splits up with the other enforcers and now must get their revenge against the Zanetti's gang members as well as being aware of the corrupted police department. Their only place to rely for help is in the bar called "The Hole". Inside, the leaders cooperate with Tracy, who is their informant. Working together to get their revenge is the only way to end this urban reality madness by recruiting, robbing, interrogating and even lay the "Beat Down" on gang members throughout Las Sombras. What's more important, the enforcers will also defend themselves through wearing various disguises to reduce the danger from being detected from either the Zanetti's gangs or the corrupted police officers.

== Development ==
Beat Down: Fists of Vengeance was developed by the Japanese company Cavia. According to executive producer Tatsuya Minami, the game was created specifically to succeed in the US market. Initially conceived as a PS2 exclusive, Cavia quickly considered expanding development to other platforms and ended up choosing the Xbox due its strong sales in that same region. Minami claimed that while producing Beat Down the team took into consideration games within the crime genre that were popular in the US. When asked if any films were a direct inspiration, he answered: "I can't think of any specific movie right now that influenced us but rest assured a staff of entirely Japanese people doing a game that takes place in a gritty American urban environment need to do plenty of research".

== Reception ==
Reception

Aggregate score
Aggregator	Score	
Aggregator	PS2	Xbox
Metacritic	48/100	51/100

Review scores
Publication	Score	
Publication	PS2	Xbox
Edge	4/10	4/10
Electronic Gaming Monthly	4.33/10	4.33/10
Eurogamer	2/10	N/A
Famitsu	30/40	30/40
Game Informer	5/10	5/10
GamePro	2.5/5	2.5/5
GameRevolution	D−	D−
GameSpot	5.2/10	5.2/10
GameSpy	2/5	N/A
GameZone	4.1/10	5/10
IGN	4.6/10	4.6/10
Official U.S. PlayStation Magazine	2/5	N/A
Official Xbox Magazine (US)	N/A	6.5/10
Detroit Free Press	2/4	N/A
The Times	3/5	3/5

The Xbox version received "mixed" reviews, while the PlayStation 2 version received "mixed or average reviews", according to the review aggregation website Metacritic. In Japan, however, Famitsu gave the game a score of 30 out of 40.
