= Ghost in the Shell: Stand Alone Complex =

2002 anime television series

- Ghost in the Shell: Stand Alone Complex complete collection cover, featuring Motoko Kusanagi and Tachikoma

攻殻機動隊 STAND ALONE COMPLEX (Kōkaku Kidōtai Sutando Arōn Konpurekkusu)
- Genre: Cyberpunk; Spy; Thriller
- Created by: Masamune Shirow
- Anime television series
- Directed by: Kenji Kamiyama
- Produced by: Yuuichirou Matsuya; Atsushi Sugita (season 1); Hisanori Kunisaki (season 2)
- Written by: Kenji Kamiyama
- Music by: Yoko Kanno
- Studio: Production I.G
- Licensed by: AUS: Madman Entertainment; NA: Bandai Entertainment; Manga Entertainment; UK: Manga Entertainment
- Original network: Perfect Choice
- English network: AU: SBS One, Sci Fi Channel (Animax); AUS: Adult Swim; CA: YTV (Bionix); IN: Animax; SEA: Animax; UK: AnimeCentral, Scuzz, Showcase TV; US: Adult Swim (Toonami), (Note: Originally aired as part of Adult Swim Action; reruns have been broadcast on Toonami following the block's May 2012 relaunch.) Starz; ZA: Animax, SABC
- Original run: 1 October 2002 – 8 January 2005
- Episodes: 52
Further information
Novel series
| Written by | Junichi Fujisaku |
| Illustrated by | Kazuto Nakazawa |
| Published by | Tokuma Shoten |
| English publisher | US: Dark Horse Comics |
| Imprint | Tokuma Dual Bunko |
| Original run | 21 January 2004 – 4 February 2005 |
| Volumes | 3 |
Original video animation
The Laughing Man; Individual Eleven
| Directed by | Kenji Kamiyama |
| Music by | Yoko Kanno |
| Studio | Production I.G |
| Licensed by | AUS: Madman Entertainment; NA: Bandai Entertainment; NA/UK: Manga Entertainment |
| Released | 23 September 2005 – 27 January 2006 |
| Runtime | 160 minutes each |
| Episodes | 2 |
Television film
Ghost in the Shell: Stand Alone Complex – Solid State Society (2006)
Manga
| Written by | Yu Kinutani |
| Published by | Kodansha |
| English publisher | US: Kodansha Comics |
| Magazine | Weekly Young Magazine (2009–2010); Monthly Young Magazine (2010–2012) |
| Original run | 14 December 2009 – 17 December 2012 |
| Volumes | 5 |
Manga
Tachikomatic Days
| Written by | Yoshiki Sakurai |
| Illustrated by | Mayasuki Yamamoto |
| Published by | Kodansha (2009–2013); DeNA (2013–2015) |
| Magazine | Monthly Young Magazine (2009–2013); Manga Box (2013–2014) |
| Original run | December 2009 – January 2014 |
| Volumes | 8 |
Manga
The Laughing Man
| Written by | Yu Kinutani |
| Published by | DeNA |
| Magazine | Manga Box |
| Original run | 4 December 2013 – 2016 |
| Volumes | 4 |
Original net animation
Ghost in the Shell: SAC_2045 (2020–2022)
Video games
Ghost in the Shell: Stand Alone Complex (PlayStation 2 game); Ghost in the Shell: Stand Alone Complex (PlayStation Portable game); Ghost in the Shell: Stand Alone Complex – First Assault Online
- icon

Ghost in the Shell: Stand Alone Complex (Note: Known in Japan as Mobile Armored Riot Police: Stand Alone Complex (攻殻機動隊 Stand Alone Complex(スタンド・アローン・コンプレックス), Kōkaku Kidōtai Sutando Arōn Konpurekkusu)) is a Japanese anime television series produced by Production I.G and based on Masamune Shirow's manga Ghost in the Shell. It was written and directed by Kenji Kamiyama, with original character design by Hajime Shimomura and a soundtrack by Yoko Kanno. The first season aired from October 2002 to October 2003 and was positively received by critics. A second season, titled Ghost in the Shell: S.A.C. 2nd Gig, (Note: Known in Japan as Mobile Armored Riot Police: S.A.C. 2nd Gig (攻殻機動隊 S.A.C. 2nd Gig(エス・エー・シー セカンド ギグ),, Kōkaku Kidōtai Esu Ē Shī Sekando Gigu)) aired from January 2004 to January 2005. Critical response to the series was generally positive.

The series centers on the members of an elite law enforcement unit known as Public Security Section 9 as they investigate cybercrime and terrorism cases; the cases in the first season often are connected to their pursuit of an elite "Super Class A" hacker and corporate terrorist known only as "The Laughing Man", whose actions end up creating the series' titular "Stand Alone Complex". A series of associated short comic animations, titled Tachikomatic Days, aired after each episode. These shorts star the Tachikoma "think-tanks" from the main series, and they typically relate directly to the story of the preceding Stand Alone Complex episode.

The first season was adapted into a feature-length OVA titled The Laughing Man, which was released in 2005. The series also received video game spin-offs for the PlayStation 2, PlayStation Portable, and mobile phones. 2nd Gig was also later adapted into a feature-length OVA entitled Individual Eleven, which was released in 2006. Solid State Society, a TV-film sequel to the Stand Alone Complex series, was also released in that year. An original net animation (ONA) series installment titled Ghost in the Shell: SAC_2045 (Note: Known in Japan as Mobile Armored Riot Police: SAC_2045 (攻殻機動隊 SAC_2045(エス・エー・シー 2045),, Kōkaku Kidōtai Esu Ē Shī Nisen Yōn Ju Go)) was formally announced in December 2018 and the first season was released on Netflix on 23 April 2020. The second season was released on 23 May 2022. Both seasons consist of 12 episodes each, with Kenji Kamiyama directing one season, and Shinji Aramaki directing the other season.

== Plot ==
=== Premise ===
The members of Section 9 (from bottom left to top right): Paz, Borma, Saito, Batou, Motoko, Togusa, Aramaki, and Ishikawa

The series takes place in the year 2030, where many people have become cyborgs with prosthetic bodies. Primarily set in New Port City (新浜市, Niihama-shi), in the fictional Japanese prefecture of Niihama (新浜県, Niihama-ken), the series follows the members of Public Security Section 9, a special-operations task-force made up of former military officers and police detectives. While the group investigates various crimes, both seasons feature ongoing investigations into two incidents that embroil the group in corruption within other branches of the Japanese government.

=== Season 1 ===
The first season of Stand Alone Complex focuses on the Laughing Man incident, wherein a hacktivist ultimately reveals to Major Motoko Kusanagi that he had discovered that several micromachine manufacturing corporations, in association with the Japanese government, suppressed information on an inexpensive cure to a debilitating cyberization disease in order to profit from the more expensive micromachine treatment. Following this, he abducted one of the owners of the company and attempted to force him to reveal the truth on live television, resulting in the hacker live-hacking everyone's vision and cameras at the event to cover his face with the stylized laughing face logo that became synonymous with his image.

His popularity spawned several genuine imitators, resulting in the series' titular Stand Alone Complex. After an investigation by the authorities causes him to resurface in the present, Section 9 discovers these companies and several Japanese politicians later used the Laughing Man's image to garner public support and profit, and they begin a campaign, spearheaded by Togusa and the Major, to disseminate the truth. This ultimately leads to the Cabinet labeling them as domestic terrorists and forcibly disbanding them, resulting in the capture of several members and Kusanagi's apparent death. However, it is all a ruse to deceive the government, and the very alive and well members of Section 9 regroup to bring the micromachine corporations and corrupt politicians to justice, resulting in the dissolution of the current Japanese government.

=== Season 2 ===
The second season, 2nd Gig, set two years after the events of the first season, explores the political and social ramifications of the two world wars that took place prior to the events of the series. At the time of the Third and the Fourth World Wars, about three million Asians became refugees and were invited into Japan as a source of cheap labor. These "invited refugees", based on the reclaimed island of Dejima, soon became unemployed in the post-war period, and their social unrest borders on outright war.

Section 9's involvement in the refugee issue begins after they successfully stop a hostage crisis caused by a domestic terrorist group known as the Individual Eleven, after which newly elected Prime Minister Yoko Kayabuki officially reinstates the organization. The group seems to be modeling themselves after the May 15 Incident, where a group of naval officers assassinated the Prime Minister and then gained the support of the public, and hope to stir up the refugees' spirits by fighting for them against the Japanese government.

The group also comes into contact with Kazundo Gōda, head of the Cabinet Intelligence Service, who gets assistance from the group in defusing several instances between the refugees as well as assisting him in transporting plutonium through Dejima, result in several failures and refugee deaths, further straining relations.

Section 9 ultimately discovers that Gōda has been manipulating both events behind the scenes, leaking the social virus that creates the Individual Eleven ideology and creating a new Stand Alone Complex, as well as the intentional failures with the refugees. However, he cannot account for the charismatic Hideo Kuze who genuinely believes in the best for the refugees and helps rally for their independence from Japan. Throughout the investigation, Kusanagi discovers she may know Kuze from her childhood. Ultimately, Gōda is found guilty of his part in the refugee incidents and killed before he can defect to the American Empire, but not before his ministrations also result in the death of Kuze.

=== Film ===
In the film Ghost in the Shell: Stand Alone Complex – Solid State Society, set two years following the resolution of the Individual Eleven incident, the Major has left Section 9, and Togusa is now field commander, leading an investigation into several deaths of refugees from the Siak Republic, which results in the discovery of a government computer system coordinating the kidnappings of 20 thousand abused children who have had their cyberbrains replaced and placing them under the care of several senior citizens made comatose by another government program that takes care of all of their bodily needs.

Their investigation, which brings the Major out of hiding, reveals an entity known as the Puppeteer behind the kidnappings. The Puppeteer is a rhizome formed by the collective will of the senior citizens, and the Siak Republic's intent to use the kidnapped children in their plans leads to their downfall. However, the investigation further reveals that a member of the House of Representatives is also using the children for his nationalistic purposes. Section 9 and the Major infiltrate a welfare center where the MP brainwashes the children, resulting in the Puppeteer revealing that the senior citizens wished to give the children free will in their future, with the politician interfering in that new plan.

== Production ==
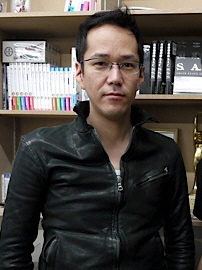
Director Kenji Kamiyama.

Ghost in the Shell: Stand Alone Complex was animated by Production I.G, and produced by Bandai Visual, Bandai Entertainment, Dentsu, Nippon Television Network, Tokuma Shoten, Victor Entertainment, and Manga Entertainment. The series was directed and written by Kenji Kamiyama, with additional screenwriters including Junichi Fujisaku, Yoshiki Sakurai, Shōtarō Suga, Dai Satō, Nobutoshi Terado, Yutaka Ōmatsu, and Yūichirō Matsuka. Masamune Shirow, author of the original Ghost in the Shell manga, provided plot for several episodes, sketches of characters and mechanical designs (including the Tachikoma), and gave his approval to the scripts before production. The series was produced with an 800 million yen investment. Kenji Kamiyama decided to make the anime television series as a "relative" to the manga and film, serving as a separate parallel world from both.

For the second season, Mamoru Oshii contributed with his ideas to the concept of the entire series and initial planning stages. In an interview, Oshii described his role in 2nd Gig as supervising the entire series and writing the plots for each episode. Dai Sato stated that they were initially going to concentrate on how Japan was going to participate in war after 9/11 as intended to portray a fictional future. But by the time they were working on the episodes, the Iraq War had already started and Japan's Self-Defense Force was sent to Iraq. During this time Japan also had an election. Sato continued to state that he created the "Individual Eleven" episodes to express irresponsibility of the Japanese people when they voted for the politicians that planned to send Japanese troops to Iraq and Afghanistan.

=== Music ===
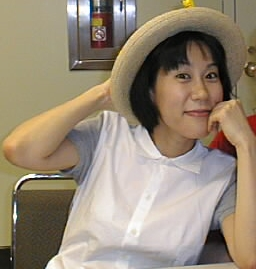
Yoko Kanno composed the music for the Stand Alone Complex series.

The soundtrack for the series was composed by Yoko Kanno and produced by Victor Entertainment. The first season's opening theme is "Inner Universe" performed by Origa (written by Origa and Shanti Snyder). The lyrics are in Russian, English, and Latin. The first season's ending theme is "Lithium Flower" performed by Scott Matthew (written by Tim Jensen). When the series was later re-broadcast on terrestrial television in Japan, "Inner Universe" was replaced with "GET9", performed by jillmax (written by Tim Jensen), while "Lithium Flower" was replaced with "I Do", written and performed by Ilaria Graziano.

The opening theme for S.A.C. 2nd Gig is "Rise" performed by Origa (written by Tim Jensen), while the ending theme is "Living Inside the Shell" performed by Steve Conte (written by Shanti Snyder). 2nd Gig also used alternate opening and closing themes when it was re-broadcast on terrestrial television, with "Rise" was replaced by "CHRisTmas in the SiLenT ForeSt" performed by Ilaria Graziano (written by Shanti Snyder), and "Living Inside the Shell" was replaced by "Snyper", performed by Ilaria Graziano (written by Tim Jensen). (Note: In the series' soundtracks, "Snyper" is titled "From the Roof Top～Somewhere in the Silence (Sniper's Theme)".)

== Broadcast ==
The pay-per-view distribution of Ghost in the Shell: Stand Alone Complex started on SKY PerfecTV!'s Perfect Choice on 1 October 2002. It ran for 26 episodes until 1 October 2003. The series was later aired on the terrestrial Nippon TV from January to June 2004. A series of associated short comic animations, titled Tachikomatic Days (タチコマな日々, Tachikoma na Hibi), aired immediately after each episode of the series. These shorts star the Tachikoma "think-tanks" from the main series, and typically relate directly to the story of the preceding Stand Alone Complex episode.

The production of a second season was immediately decided after the first season's TV airing. The second season was initially hinted when Bandai has extended the episode list to 52 episodes at Otakon of 2003. In October 2003, Production I.G officially announced a second season of 26 for the series, which would air at a rate of 2 episodes per month. The second season of Stand Alone Complex, titled Ghost in the Shell: S.A.C. 2nd Gig, aired on Animax from 1 January 2004 to 8 January 2005. It later aired on Nippon TV from April to September 2005.

Ghost in the Shell: Stand Alone Complex was subsequently licensed by Bandai Visual and Manga Entertainment in North America, and Madman Entertainment in Australia. It was broadcast in the United States on Cartoon Network's Adult Swim programming block, in Canada by YTV and in the United Kingdom by AnimeCentral.

On 18 March 2015 it was announced that Stand Alone Complex would receive a full weekly rebroadcasting in Japan on BS11, starting on 1 April 2015. On 25 April 2017, Starz announced that they would be offering episodes of the series for their video on demand service starting 1 May 2017.

== Related media ==
=== OVAs ===
A feature-length OVA titled Ghost in the Shell: Stand Alone Complex – The Laughing Man was released in Japan on 23 September 2005, and in North America on 2 October 2007. The OVA retells the first season of the anime television series with minor alterations to the storyline to accommodate an abbreviated take on the Laughing Man affair. Some additional animation and voice work was also added. Although the Japanese-language version retained the voice cast from the anime series, the English version has a new cast of voice actors. The dialogue recording for the English version was produced by Ocean Productions. A Blu-ray version was released on 22 December 2010.

Ghost in the Shell: S.A.C. 2nd Gig – Individual Eleven is a feature-length OVA which retells the events of S.A.C. 2nd Gig, altered to focus on both the Individual Eleven investigation and the relationship between Hideo Kuze and Motoko Kusanagi. Newly animated scenes and a remixed soundtrack are also included.

=== Television film ===
A television film sequel titled Ghost in the Shell: Stand Alone Complex – Solid State Society was released in 2006.

=== Video games ===
Ghost in the Shell: Stand Alone Complex has received two console game spinoffs, both of which were published by Sony Computer Entertainment in Japan and Bandai in North America and Europe. The first is Ghost in the Shell: Stand Alone Complex for the PlayStation 2 and was developed by Cavia. It was released on 4 March 2004 in Japan and 8 November 2004 in North America. The second—a sequel to the first—is a PlayStation Portable title, developed by G-Artists, and is also titled Ghost in the Shell: Stand Alone Complex. (Note: In Japan, the game is known as Ghost in the Shell: Stand Alone Complex -Domain of the Hunters- (攻殻機動隊 STAND ALONE COMPLEX －狩人の領域－, Kōkaku Kidōtai STAND ALONE COMPLEX -Karyūdo no Ryōiki-)) It was released in Japan on 15 September 2005 and in North America on 25 October 2005.

Several mobile phone games have been released exclusively to Japan. The first is titled Ghost in the Shell: S.A.C. Cyber Mission (攻殻機動隊 S.A.C. サイバーミッション, Kōkakukidōtai SAC Saibā Misshon) and was developed by GREE and released on 14 February 2011. The second shares the name of the anime, was developed by Mobage, and released on 16 November 2011. The game focuses on an unnamed new detective who works for Section 9. The third is a social game also developed by Mobage, titled Ghost in the Shell: S.A.C. Tachikoma Wars! (攻殻機動隊 S.A.C. タチコマウォーズ!, Kōkaku Kidōtai S.A.C. Tachikoma Wōzu!), and released on 29 March 2012.

On 13 December 2012, Nexon stated it had obtained the rights of Ghost in the Shell: Stand Alone Complex for the purpose of the creation of a massively multiplayer online game. The game was formally announced on 17 September 2015, under the title of Ghost in the Shell: Stand Alone Complex – First Assault Online. The game was a squad-based first-person shooter for Microsoft Windows, developed by Neople and featuring voice performances by the original anime cast. First Assault Online entered early access on Steam on 14 December 2015, but was discontinued in all territories by the end of 2017, due to low player uptake, poor reception, lack of differentation from other games in the genre, and the developers' own dissatisfaction with the quality of the game.

=== Novels ===
A three-volume novel series based on the anime television series and collecting self-contained stories was written by staff writer Junichi Fujisaku and illustrated by Kazuto Nakazawa. The novels were published by Tokuma Shoten and distributed by Dark Horse Comics in the United States. The first volume, titled Ghost in the Shell: Stand Alone Complex – The Lost Memory, (Note: In Japan, this novel is titled Ghost in the Shell: Stand Alone Complex – Dream Circuit (攻殻機動隊 STAND ALONE COMPLEX 虚夢回路, Kōkaku Kidōtai STAND ALONE COMPLEX Kyomu Kairo)) was released on 21 January 2004 in Japan and on 24 May 2006 in the US. The second volume, Ghost in the Shell: Stand Alone Complex – Revenge of the Cold Machines, (Note: Ghost in the Shell: Stand Alone Complex – Frozen Machine (攻殻機動隊 STAND ALONE COMPLEX 凍える機械, Kōkaku Kidōtai STAND ALONE COMPLEX Kogoeru Kikai) in Japan.) was released on 8 July 2004 in Japan and on 26 September 2006 in the US. The third volume, Ghost in the Shell: Stand Alone Complex – White Maze (Note: Ghost in the Shell: Stand Alone Complex – Coffin of a Sleeping Man (攻殻機動隊 STAND ALONE COMPLEX 眠り男の棺, Kōkaku Kidōtai STAND ALONE COMPLEX Nemuri Otoko no Kan) in Japan.) was released on 4 February 2005 in Japan and on 2 January 2007 in the US.

=== Manga ===
Two manga series based on Stand Alone Complex have been published by Kodansha. The first series, Ghost in the Shell: S.A.C. – Tachikomatic Days (攻殻機動隊S.A.C. タチコマなヒビ, Kōkaku Kidōtai S.A.C. Tachikoma na Hibi), is based on the associated Tachikomatic Days shorts. The manga was written by Yoshiki Sakurai and illustrated by Mayasuki Yamamoto, and published in Monthly Young Magazine from 9 December 2009 to 9 October 2013 and finished on the Manga Box online platform in January 2014. (Note: It finished in the magazine's November 2013 issue, released on 9 October of that same year; finished on Manga Box in January 2014.) Eight tankōbon volumes were released.

The second manga series, sharing its name with the television series, was illustrated by Yu Kinutani and launched on 14 December 2009 in Weekly Young Magazine, and later transferred to Monthly Young Magazine on 14 April 2010. The manga is an adaptation of the first season of the anime series. Five tankōbon volumes were released. The first volume subtitled "Episode 1: Section9" was released on 6 April 2010 in Japan and on 24 May 2011 in North America. The second volume subtitiled "Episode 2: Testation" was released on 5 November 2010 in Japan and on 29 November 2011 in North America. The third volume subtitled "Episode 3: Idolater" was released on 5 August 2011 in Japan. The fourth volume subtitled "Episode 4: ¥€$" was released on 6 March 2012 in Japan. The fifth volume subtitled "Episode 5: Not Equal" was released on 6 March 2013 in Japan.

=== Other ===
An official guidebook and DVD to the first 19 episodes of the TV series titled Ghost in the Shell: Stand Alone Complex Official Log 1 was released by Bandai and Manga Entertainment on 25 October 2005. The guidebook and DVD contains several interviews from several staff members, reports on several animation techniques and other reports on several concepts of the series. A second guidebook/DVD titled Ghost in the Shell: Stand Alone Complex Official Log 2 was released on 24 January 2006 featuring background, commentary and examination of the remaining 7 episodes. Another guidebook titled Ghost in the Shell: SAC – Ultimate Archive (攻殻機動隊SACアルティメットアーカイブ, Kōkaku Kidōtai SAC Arutimetto Ākaibu) was published by Tokuma Shoten and released on 31 March 2007. Another guidebook titled Tachikoma's All Memory was published by Ginga Shuppan and released on 22 October 2008.

Numerous figurines have been released for Stand Alone Complex versions of the characters with Motoko and Tachikoma being a central focus. Various figures have been produced from CM Corporation, and Kaitendo. Tachikoma figures have been produced by various companies, including one by the Good Smile Company in cooperation with Nendoron. A 1/24-scale plastic model kit of the Tachikoma was produced by Wave in December 2005. Other merchandise includes clothing, key chains, notebooks, patches, bags, posters and body pillows.

== Reception ==
=== Season 1 ===
Ghost in the Shell: Stand Alone Complex received mostly positive reviews from critics, who praised the series' high quality of animation and the musical score by Yoko Kanno. In particular, reviewers reacted positively to the world of high-technology that Stand Alone Complex presents, described as "believably futuristic". Lawrence Person from Locus Online wrote that "the world of [Stand Alone Complex] is recognizably our own, or rather, one recognizably extrapolated from modern Japan. While parts of the technology seem unlikely in the time-frame allotted, none seems impossible."

In addition, several reviews mentioned what they perceived to be overarching themes explored in the series as a result of the setting; specifically, the meaning of humanity in a world where the lines between man and machine were becoming increasingly blurred, as well as various societal issues that might emerge as a result of advances in technology.

Reviewers agreed that the main "Laughing Man" storyline was satisfying, characterizing it variously as "interesting", "complex", and "engaging". Reaction to the series' "Stand Alone" episodes, however, was mixed: some reviewers considered these episodes to be boring and, in some cases, the worst episodes of the series, while others contended that they allowed further development of the characters and the futuristic setting.

Certain commentators specifically focused on the series' success or failure in achieving the high standards set by the critically acclaimed 1995 film Ghost in the Shell. Opinion in this regard was divided: although these reviewers took an overall favorable view, some reviews criticized the quality of animation, while others felt that the series' story lacked the depth of the original film. This "lack of depth", however, was attributed to the fact that Stand Alone Complex is an action-oriented series with a limited episode length in which to explore deeper themes.

The Encyclopedia of Science Fiction described the first season of Ghost in the Shell: Stand Alone Complex as an enjoyable and often exciting cyberpunk thriller, highlighting its exploration of government and corporate corruption through the Laughing Man storyline. It particularly praised the philosophical treatment of artificial intelligence through the Tachikomas, whose gradual development of individuality and self-awareness raises questions about the nature of intelligence. The encyclopedia also noted the series' recurring concern with the manipulation of memory, perception and digital information, which complicates the search for truth. However, it considered the resolution of the central storyline anticlimactic and observed that the standalone episodes, though frequently entertaining, sometimes felt rushed.

Bolstering the generally positive reviews of the series, Ghost in the Shell: Stand Alone Complex won an Excellence Prize (Animation Division) at the 2002 Japan Media Arts Festival, a Notable Entry Award at the 2003 Tokyo International Anime Fair, and was featured in June 2004 by Newtype USA, with a "double scoop" cover story. The Japan Media Arts Festival provided a brief summary of Stand Alone Complex, calling it a "completely original television series ... entertaining and easy to understand".

=== Season 2 ===
Chris Beveridge of Mania gave 2nd Gig an overall score of A praising its coloring stating, "Colors are gorgeous and solid, especially all the various areas of large soft colors that look to be amazingly solid and with no visible break-up even during pausing." Mark Thomas of Mania also gave it an overall score of A, stating: "It has plenty of good action and thought provoking plot points." Andy Patricio of IGN rated the first DVD volume 9/10 praised the animation, stating: "Artwork is richer; this is easily the best-looking anime Production I.G. has ever produced. CG is richer and more widely used. Animation is more complex and fluid, although it's still a little jerky, which is common in TV shows."

Joe Luscik of Animefringe ranked the series 4.5 out of 5 praising the animation stating it "is just awesome". Adam Arseneau of DVD Verdict praised the direction of the 2nd season compared to the first stating, "The tongue-in-cheek humor that made the show clever and endearing is still present, but the atmosphere feels more violent, more urban and dystopic, as if no longer afraid to address the social problems of the future."

The Encyclopedia of Science Fiction considered the second season of Ghost in the Shell: Stand Alone Complex as enjoyable continuation of the first season, praising its engagement with social and political issues, particularly the manipulation of Japan's refugee crisis in the Individual Eleven storyline. However, it found the narrative unevenly paced, with some episodes devoted to secondary characters whose characterization it considered underdeveloped. The encyclopedia nevertheless regarded the season's finale as a notable improvement over the first season's conclusion. It also highlighted the series' continuing exploration of the relationship between technology and society, particularly the vulnerability of memories, perceptions and digital records to manipulation by powerful institutions. Among its broader criticisms were excessive exposition, occasionally stretched-out storylines, shortage of female characters and fan service, exemplified by "the Major's scanty attire".

The third DVD volume of the series was one of top-selling series in North America in 2006. It was also nominated for the Best Animated TV DVD honor category in the TV DVD Awards. In the American Anime Awards from 2007, Mary Elizabeth McGlynn earned the award of "Best Actress".
