= Orion (manga) =

Manga by Masamune Shirow

- The second edition of Orion published by Dark Horse Comics

仙術超攻殻オリオン (Senjutsu Chōkōkaku Orion)
- Genre: Science fantasy
- Manga
- Written by: Masamune Shirow
- Published by: Seishinsha
- English publisher: NA: Dark Horse Comics
- Magazine: Comic Gaia
- Original run: August 8, 1990 – August 20, 1991
- Volumes: 1

Orion (仙術超攻殻オリオン, Senjutsu Chōkōkaku Orion) is a manga by Masamune Shirow, first serialized in 1990 and 1991 in Seishinsha Comic Gaia magazine. Studio 4°C produced a 150-second animated film short based on the manga in 2010.

== Description ==
The magic/technology described in the story draws upon ideas from Buddhism, Taoism, ancient Japanese myth, elements of cyberpunk, Yin/Yang mysticism, and particle physics. The story is based on a minor empire within the expansive (25-world) Galactic Empire, known as Great Yamato Empire, located on a minor backwater world. Dealing with gods, end-of-world scenarios and numbers of characters caught up in a universe-shattering event.

The Galaxy Empire spans 25 worlds and is connected by magic-powered starships. Masamune Shirow has combined many aspects of magic with technology.

- Elements of cybernetic technology can be seen in use by warriors of the Great Yamato Empire. These warriors integrated with what appear oversize suits of armor which have human arms and legs, pelvis removed and connected by series of wires and tubes. Not all these armors require this, Commander Rommel remains wholly human. These Armor Knights besides wielding swords, staff like Halberds, as well magic-wielding devices. These Armor Knights have limited flight abilities.
- Starships: Seen in the beginning of the story, Masamune Shirow has starships guided by human navigators which "phase" through time and space not unlike starships seen in the 1984 film Dune. The warships appear as Japanese warships of the Middle Ages which have broadside armaments not unlike 18th-century warships. These vessels are normally seen hovering or flying instead of lying in water.
- Diagrams/Forums: These are large, circular mystic spells used by characters of the story. They can be used as explosive alarm clocks, summoning spells, magical controlling devices (such as Nāga Generator), as well as controlling starships.
- Nāga Generator: This device was conceived by mixing science and mystic magic to collect all negative karma in the known universe to purify the Galaxy Empire.
- Psychoscience: This is a mixture of science and mysticism which gives one the power to wield magic on the level of the gods. However, science is needed to monitor and control this mix. It is still being developed, thus prone to problems which are seen throughout the story.

== Plot ==
The main plot revolves around the Yamata Empire's plan to destroy all the galaxy's negative karma using a massive technological reactor called the Nāga Generator. Unfortunately, negative karma cannot simply be destroyed, it must be atoned for. However, the leader of the powerful mystic Buddhist Fuze Clan plans to stop the destruction of the negative karma which will end up creating the nine-headed Nāga and destroy the world if not the whole universe. To help in stopping the creation of the Nāga, the clan summons Susano, the Shinto warrior god of Destruction. The powerful, arrogant, and homicidal god faces challenges. These include the Empire and the clan leader's own daughter, the bratty sorceress Seska, who is possessed by the power of negative Karma and a powerful magic formula. At the beginning, the Clan steals a secret magical formula which contains the power to control the Nāga.

Fuze's leader, Maître Fuzen, begins the ceremony when his rival, Dr. Hebime, leads troops to Fuza's shrine to arrest him and his clan. Seska, newly arrived from a starship, is nearly arrested herself and dashes ahead of the troops. She bumbles into the summoning ceremony, and is forced to "wear" the secret diagram to save it. Dr. Hebime and his troops arrive in time to kill Maître Fuzen and his followers as they complete the summoning ceremony of warrior god Susano Orbatos. Susano warns the troops and is angry that he has no proper offerings. Seeing Seska with the diagram on her body, he swallows her whole. Dr. Hebime forces his troops to attack him and has the military HQ fire powerful forbidden spells at Susano. The weapons strike him and disable him. This infuriates him further and he destroys the Fuze mountain temple as Hebime escapes. Susano resurrects Maître Fuzen and has him witness what happens when a god is angered. He then goes on a rage destroying a good chunk of the capital city. Dr. Hebime summons Hanuman (the monkey god) who also fails to stop Susano.

Susano and Maître investigate the palace and discover that Princesse Kushinata is to be sacrificed to the Nāga Generator. They go and fight off the palace's defenses. Meanwhile, Seska is revived by the power of the negative karma and dedicates herself to avenging her father's death and saving her clan by gaining an audience with the Emperor. By becoming a royal adviser to Emperor she begins to activate the Nāga Generator and uses the secret scroll which can banish Susano. Ultimately, the Nāga Generator is activated and both Susano and Seska clash. The Nāga Generator creates a monstrous nine-headed Nāga which becomes so bloated with Galactic Empire's negative Karma it becomes a planet-sized Octopus-type Nāga. Seska, after beating up Susano, banishes him. As Nāga grows, she becomes fascinated in ruling the Galactic Empire itself.

However, Susano returns, summoning himself, rendering Seska's ability to stop him useless. He enters the Nāga and finds the Princess at the center of the generator holding the Nāga force together. He breaks her control of the Nāga and disrupts it. The giant Nāga splatters over the world like water, flooding it. The Great Yamato Empire (what is left of it), sinks under the waves with few survivors. Susano and the princess leave the mortal survivors of the Empire behind wishing them luck. Seska is restored back to normal and is reunited with Commander Ronnel. What remains of Yamato Empire appears to become Japan and the world is, in fact, Earth. However, the story adds that the Nāga will return.

The fictional Yamata Empire is based on an expanded continent of what would become the Pacific Ocean, drawing from the ancient mythology of the continent of Mu.

== Characters ==
- Susano Orbatos: God of Destruction, a powerful, wild, arrogant, homicidal divinity.
- Seska: Bratty, beloved, egotistical, bumbling, a 1st Class Navigator sorceress aboard magical-powered starships. She has a crush on Commander Ronnel.
- Maître Fuzen: Clan leader of Fuze Clan who opposes the Naga Generator and summons Susano Orbatos to stop the project. He becomes Susano's aide in his crusade to stop the Nāga Generator.
- Dr. Hebime: Leading doctor and creator of Psycoscience and Maître Fuzen's rival. Creator of the Nāga Generator. He is dedicated to stopping the Fuze Clan from interfering with his dream of the Nāga Generator.
- Commander Ronnel: Noble handsome officer of the Greater Yamata Empire, and secretly attracted to Seska.
- Sokoku Emperor: Idle, lazy leader of the Great Yamata Empire, who approves the creation of the Naga Generator and is nearly killed by it.
- Princesse Kushinata: The half-divinity princess who agreed to be sacrificed to the Nāga Generator to stop negative karma from destroying the Galactic Empire. She has some links to Susano Orbatos.
