= Last Alliance (band) =

Japanese band

- Origin: Machida, Tokyo, Japan
- Genres: Indie rock, post-punk revival, alternative rock, melodic hardcore
- Years active: 2002–present
- Labels: Tears Library (2003-2005); One-Coin records (2004-2006); VAP, Inc. (2007-present)
- Members: Ryusuke Anzai (vocals and guitar); Takahiko Matsumura (vocals and bass); Shingo Sano (guitar); Hiroshi Ozawa (drums)
- Website: Official site

Last Alliance (ラスト・アライアンス, Rasuto Araiansu; stylized as LAST ALLIANCE) is a Japanese rock band formed in 2002, known for their lyrical-focused songs.

== History ==
They have performed opening and ending theme songs for various anime series such as Ouran High School Host Club, RD Sennō Chōsashitsu, and Hajime No Ippo: New Challenger. To date, they have released six albums, a mini-album, and eight singles.

== Members ==
- Ryusuke Anzai (安斉 龍介, Anzai Ryūsuke) - vocals, rhythm guitar
- Takahiko Matsumura (松村 孝彦, Matsumura Takahiko) - vocals, bass
- Shingo Sano (佐野 森吾, Sano Shingo) - lead guitar, screaming, backing vocals
- Hiroshi Ozawa (小澤 浩史, Ozawa Hiroshi) - drums, backing vocals

== Discography ==
=== Albums ===
==== Tears Library ====
Tears Library

Studio album by Last Alliance
- Released: July 19, 2003
- Genre: Rock
- Length: 34:59
- Label: Tears Library
- Producers: Last Alliance and Tsutomu Oikawa

Tears Library (stylized TEARS LIBRARY) is Last Alliance's first studio album released on July 19, 2003.

Track listing

1. Boys Don't Cry - 3:57
2. Run into the Freedom - 3:39
3. Itsuwari no Orange (偽りのオレンジ; "Orange of Lies") - 3:59
4. Last Alliance - 1:51
5. Rebel Fire - 2:22
6. Beautiful - 0:48
7. Planetarium (プラネタリウム, Puranetariamu) - 3:10
8. See You Again - 2:54
9. Sky Is Crying - 3:36
10. Hidarimuki (ヒダリムキ; "Facing Left") - 4:22
11. Equal Reason - 4:27

==== Underground Blue ====
Underground Blue

Studio album by Last Alliance
- Released: November 8, 2004
- Genre: Rock
- Length: 59:15
- Label: One-Coin Records

Underground Blue (stylized UNDERGROUND BLUE) is Last Alliance's second studio album released on November 8, 2004. The track "Greens Sunlight" was featured in the Nippon TV program Ongaku Senshi: Music Fighter.

Track listing

1. South Wind Knows - 3:44
2. Clone - 4:12
3. Solitude (ソリチュード, Sorichūdo) - 5:06
4. Filter (フィルター, Firutā) - 4:06
5. One Hot Second - 3:45
6. Musō Jidai (夢想時代; "Dream Age") - 4:29
7. Urge - 3:34
8. Greens Sunlight - 3:46
9. Jikū Trip (時空 Trip; "Space-Time Trip") - 5:38
10. Okizari Ace (置き去りエース; "Desertion Ace") - 3:41
11. Lucky Luciano ni Utareru Mae ni (ラッキー・ルチアーノに射たれる前に; "Before Lucky Luciano Shot Me") - 3:31
12. Truth in My Arms - 3:40
13. Tadayou Yugure ni, Kiete Yuku Hibi (漂う夕暮れに、消えてゆく日々; "Drifting in the Evening, Disappearing Every Day") - 6:10
14. Letter - 3:58

==== Me and Your Borderline ====
Me and Your Borderline

Studio album by Last Alliance
- Released: December 6, 2006
- Genre: Rock
- Length: 1:00:56
- Label: One-Coin Records

Me and Your Borderline is Last Alliance's third studio album released on December 6, 2006. The track "Spiral World" was used as the ending theme to the Nippon TV program Ongaku Senshi: Music Fighter and the tracks "Akai Hana" and "Jōka" were re-recorded on the limited edition release of Keep on Smashing Blue. The track "Shissou" was used as the ending theme to the anime "Ouran High-School Host Club".

Track listing

1. Break a mirror - 4:35
2. Konoyubitomare - 4:00
3. Shissou (疾走; "Sprint") - 3:54
4. Akai Hana (赤い花; "Red Flower") - 4:25
5. Amy Syndrome (エイミーシンドローム, Eimi Shindorōmu) - 4:22
6. Oto no Nai Sekai (音の無い世界; "A World Without Sound") - 4:18
7. Spiral World - 3:40
8. Zenmai (ゼンマイ; "Spring") - 4:26
9. Gray End - 5:31
10. Fantasia - 4:21
11. Lie of Eternity, Paint It Blue - 4:32
12. Prometheus (プロメテウス, Purometeusu) - 3:48
13. Sharing Sky (シェアリングスカイ, Shearingu Sukai) - 3:57
14. Jōka (浄化; "Purification") - 5:13

==== The Sum ====
The Sum

Studio album by Last Alliance
- Released: June 25, 2008
- Genre: Rock
- Length: 48:19
- Label: VAP, Inc.

The Sum (stylized the sum) is Last Alliance's fourth studio album released on June 25, 2008.

Track listing

1. Change by 1 - 3:05
2. Proud of Scar - 2:05
3. Mujūryoku Oneway Shuttle (無重力 Oneway Shuttle; "Zero-Gravity Oneway Shuttle") - 4:18
4. Sabaku to Gensō (砂漠と幻想; "Deserts and Illusions") - 3:36
5. Katahiza no Yogore (片膝の汚れ; "Dirty Knee") - 3:20
6. Perfect Game - 4:30
7. Yureta Byoshin (揺れた秒針)- 4:48
8. Lonesome World (ロンサムワールド, Ronsamu Wārudo) - 4:15
9. Drag On - 4:33
10. World Is Mine - 3:55
11. Ameagari ni Graffiti (雨上がりにグラフィティ; "Graffiti After the Rain") - 4:47
12. Gunjo Kurage (群青海月; "Ultramarine Jellyfish") - 4:26

==== Keep on Smashing Blue ====
Keep on Smashing Blue

Studio album by Last Alliance
- Released: October 27, 2010
- Genre: Rock
- Label: VAP, Inc.

Keep on Smashing Blue (stylized Keep on smashing blue,) is Last Alliance's fifth studio album released on October 27, 2010. The Limited Edition release contains a DVD of the Kawasaki Relax tour held at Club Quattro on January 28, 2010, a PV of "Wing", and two bonus tracks previously featured in Me and Your Borderline: "Akai Hana (Sweet Anzai Boy)", performed by Anzai, and "Jōka (Angry Matsumura Boy)", performed by Matsumura.

1. Blue Lightning - 4:10
2. Everything Is Evanescent - 3:13
3. Ne(w)rotic World - 3:57
4. Loser - 1:17
5. Third Eyes Syndicate (サードアイズシンジケート, Sādo Aizu Shinjikēdo) - 3:45
6. Kotō no Basquiat (孤島のバスキア) - 2:13
7. Take Over - 1:32
8. Time Will Tell: Dear Youth - 3:03
9. Wing - 4:33
10. Alliance Airlines - 3:42
11. Ayatsuri (あやつり) - 3:41
12. Negaikata Monshirochō ga Sora wo Mau (願イ型紋白蝶ガ宙ヲ舞ウ) - 4:28
13. Hekireki - 3:45
14. Looking for the Rainy Sky - 3:03
15. Time Capsule (タイムカプセル, Taimu Kapuseru) - 4:16
16. Akai Hana (Sweet Anzai Boy) (赤い花(Sweet Anzai Boy)) (Limited Edition only) - 4:41
17. Jōka (Angry Matsumura Boy) (浄化(Angry Matsumura Boy)) (Limited Edition only) - 5:13

==== For Staying Real Blue ====
For Staying Real Blue

Studio album by Last Alliance
- Released: June 14, 2011
- Genre: Rock
- Label: VAP, Inc.

For Staying Real Blue (stylized for staying real BLUE.) is Last Alliance's sixth studio album released on June 15, 2011.

1. In My Hand - 2:23
2. Revolution Is Starting - 2:58
3. Capone's Borsalino (カポネのボルサリーノ, Kapone no Borusarīno) - 3:29
4. Throat Wart (スロートワート, Surōto Wāto) - 3:59
5. One - 3:52
6. Niji vs Hikōkigumo (虹vs飛行機雲; "Rainbow vs. Contrail") - 2:26
7. Kengeki no Hibiki (剣戟の響き; "Clash of Sound") - 3:57
8. Deandre - 3:34
9. Boku Shinron (僕信論; "My Theory") - 2:54
10. Redesign - 3:54
11. μ (Mu) - 3:24
12. Stardoubt - 3:06
13. Empty Heart (エンプティハート, Enputi Hāto) - 3:58
14. Precious Line - 3:03
15. Seijaku no Naka, Sono Ya wa Houbutsusen o Egaku (静寂の中、その矢は放物線を描く; "Within the Silence, the Arrow Draws a Parabola") - 4:50
16. Ichi Nigiri no Ao (一握りの青; "A Handful of Blue") (Limited Edition Bonus Track) - 3:18
17. Melancholy (Limited Edition Bonus Track) - 3:35

==== Seventh Sense ====
Seventh Sense

Studio album by Last Alliance
- Released: March 20, 2013
- Genre: Rock
- Label: VAP, Inc.

Seventh Sense (stylized Seventh Sense.) is Last Alliance's seventh studio album released on March 20, 2013.

1. BLUE BIRD SHERRY - 3:07
2. Thanatos (タナトス, Tanatosu) - 4:24
3. Didyudidi (ディデュディディ, Dide~yudidi) - 3:51
4. Light (灯, Akari) - 4:36
5. a burning bullet - 4:14
6. Tōriame (通り雨, "Shower") - 4:08
7. Harōendogubbai (ハローエンドグッバイ, "Hello End Goodbye") - 5:09
8. DELETE - 4:52
9. Ningen ni Tsuge (人間に告, "Notify Humans") - 3:47
10. Sensation - 4:22
11. time-lag-cloud - 3:47
12. Tsubomi (つぼみ, "Bud") - 5:31

=== Mini-albums ===
==== Kawasaki Relax ====
Kawasaki Relax

EP by Last Alliance
- Released: October 10, 2009
- Genre: Indie rock
- Length: 16:37
- Label: VAP, Inc.

Kawasaki Relax (stylized KAWASAKI RELAX) is Last Alliance's first mini-album released on October 10, 2009. It is the first (and currently only) album that contains full English lyrics.

Track listing

1. Wedge - 3:27
2. Today - 3:27
3. Days - 2:58
4. 8Heartbeat∞ - 3:08
5. Tomorrow - 3:41

=== Singles ===
==== Last Alliance ====
"Last Alliance"

Single by Last Alliance
- Released: June 18, 2003
- Genre: Indie rock
- Label: Tears Library

Last Alliance (stylized LAST ALLIANCE) is the first self-titled single by Last Alliance released on June 18, 2003. All three songs were later re-recorded in Tears Library. The single is currently out of print.

Track listing

1. Boys Don't Cry - 3:57
2. Last Alliance - 1:54
3. Equal REason - 4:27

==== YG Service ====
"YG Service"

Single by Last Alliance
- Released: February 18, 2004
- Genre: Indie rock
- Label: Tears Library

YG Service (YGサービス, Wai Jī Sābisu) is the second single by Last Alliance released on February 18, 2004. The CD for the single contains a music video for the song "Equal Reason".

Track listing

1. Sketch - 3:44
2. Slow Starter (スロースターター, Surō Sutātā) - 4:20
3. Maboroshi Memory - 4:54

==== IO ====
"IO"

Single by Last Alliance
- Released: July 21, 2004
- Genre: Indie rock
- Label: Tears Library

IO is the third single by Last Alliance released on July 21, 2004. The songs "Solitude", "Musō Jidai", and "Truth in My Arms" were re-recorded in Underground Blue. The single is currently out of print.

Track listing

1. Solitude (ソリチュード, Sorichūdo) - 5:09
2. Musō Jidai (夢想時代; "Dream Age") - 4:28
3. Melancholy - 3:35
4. Truth in My Arms - 3:38

==== Re:frain ====
"Re:frain"

Single by Last Alliance
- Released: October 5, 2005
- Genre: Indie rock
- Label: One-Coin Records

Re:frain is the fourth single by Last Alliance released on October 5, 2005. The song "Konoyubitomare" was later re-recorded in Me and Your Borderline.

Track listing

1. Color Desert - 4:53
2. Ryusei Namida (流星涙) - 4:41
3. Astrogate-0 - 4:38
4. Konoyubitomare - 4:32

==== Daze & Hope ====
"Daze & Hope"

Single by Last Alliance
- Released: May 17, 2006
- Genre: Indie rock
- Label: One-Coin Records

Daze & Hope (stylized DAZE&HOPE) is the fifth single by Last Alliance released on May 17, 2006. The CD for the single contains a promotional video for the song "Greens Sunlight". The track "Shissō" was used as the ending theme for the anime television series Ouran High School Host Club and was later re-recorded in Me and Your Borderline.

Track listing

1. Shissō (疾走; "Sprint") - 3:55
2. Fly Again, Hero - 3:28
3. Ittō Ryodan (一刀旅団; "Cut in Two with a Stroke of a Sword") - 0:25
4. One Drop of Tear - 3:32

==== Signal 004 ====
"Signal 004"

Single by Last Alliance
- Released: November 28, 2007
- Genre: Indie rock
- Label: VAP, Inc.

Signal 004 is the sixth single by Last Alliance released on November 28, 2007. The song "Drag On" was rerecorded in the sum. A DVD of the single contains music videos of "Drag On" and "Shissō".

Track listing

1. Drag On - 4:39
2. Aoi Jūsō (蒼い銃創; "Blue Gunwounds") - 4:08
3. Mafuyu no Semi (真冬の蝉; "Midwinter Cicada") - 4:29

==== Always in My Heart ====
"Always in My Heart"

Single by Last Alliance
- Released: April 16, 2008
- Genre: Indie rock
- Label: VAP, Inc.

Always in My Heart is the seventh single by Last Alliance released on April 16, 2008. The track "Katahiza no Yogore" was used as the ending theme for the anime television series RD Sennō Chōsashitsu and was later re-recorded in the sum.

Track listing

1. Katahiza no Yogore (片膝の汚れ; "Dirty Knee") - 3:18
2. I.O.J.F.K (intro) - 1:07
3. I.O.J.F.K - 3:28

==== New Dawn ====
"New Dawn"

Single by Last Alliance
- Released: March 4, 2009
- Genre: Indie rock
- Label: VAP, Inc.

New Dawn (stylized new dawn) is the eighth single by Last Alliance released on March 4, 2009. The track "Hekireki" was used the opening theme for the anime television series Hajime No Ippo: New Challenger and was later re-recorded in Keep on Smashing Blue.

Track listing

1. Hekireki - 4:09
2. My Idea - 3:46
3. Rashin (羅針; "Compass")- 4:25
