= Ghost in the Shell: Stand Alone Complex – First Assault Online =

2016 video game

Ghost in the Shell: Stand Alone Complex First Assault Online
- Developer: NeoPle
- Publisher: Nexon
- Series: Ghost in the Shell
- Engine: Gamebryo
- Platform: Microsoft Windows
- Release: December 14, 2015 (early access); July 1, 2017
- Genre: First-person shooter
- Mode: Multiplayer

Ghost in the Shell: Stand Alone Complex – First Assault Online (Korean: 공각기동대 온라인; Japanese: 攻殻機動隊ONLINE), also known simply as First Assault, was a free-to-play online first-person shooter video game developed by Neople and published by Nexon. It was one of multiple adaptations of the anime series Ghost in the Shell: Stand Alone Complex. The game was discontinued in December 2017.

== Gameplay ==
Ghost in the Shell: Stand Alone Complex – First Assault Online was based on the universe of Ghost in the Shell: Stand Alone Complex. The game featured a cyborg customization feature which supported 5,000 different layouts. Players were able to share skills with nearby allies, allowing players to strategically support others, in addition to using thermoptic camouflage and power armor, and controlling various mecha. There were PvE and PvP modes. Attributes could be used to customise the player's character include power, which granted weapons, stealth (used for invisibility), detection (reconnaissance drones), and "support" which gave the ability to construct turrets.

== History ==
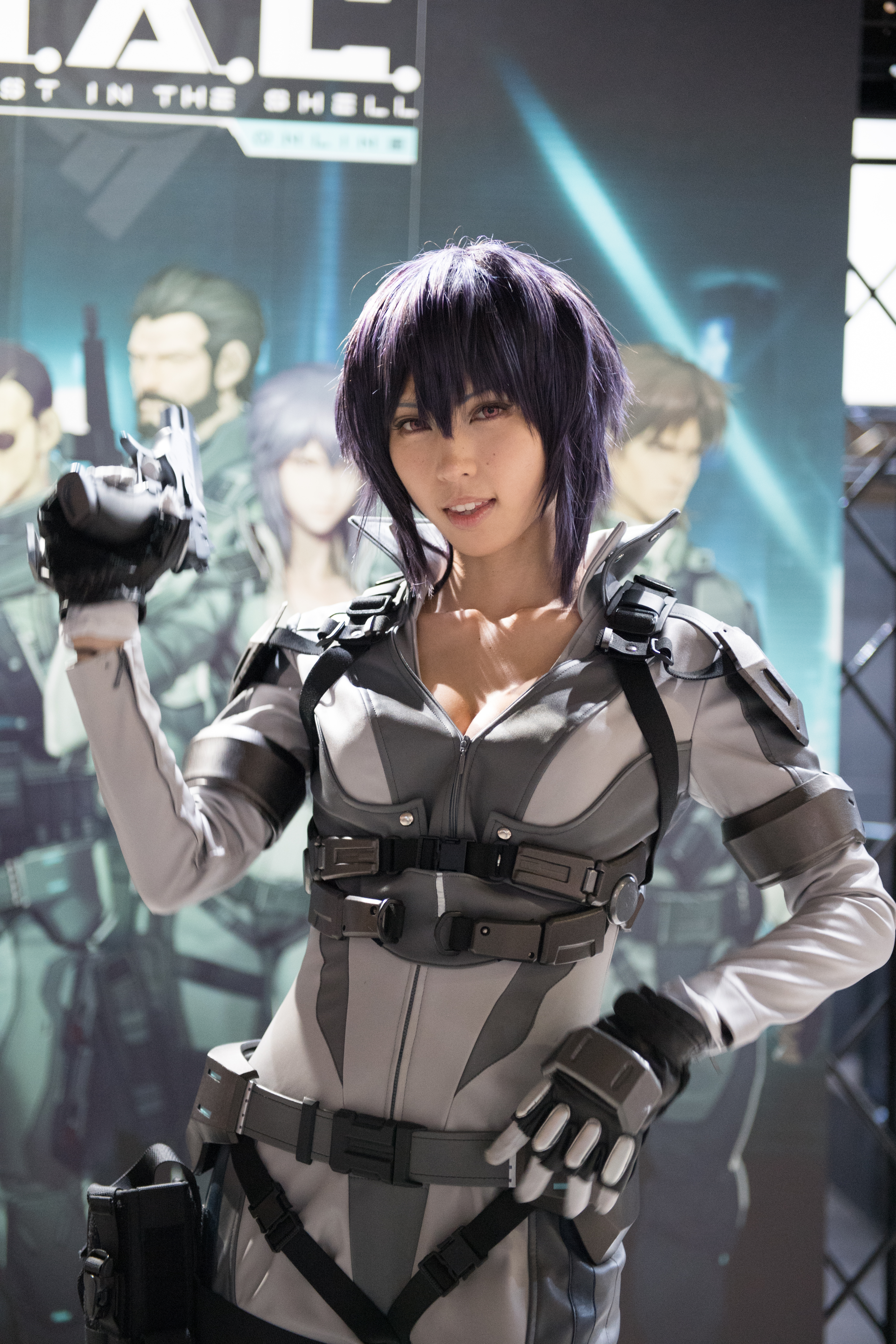
Promotion at TGS 2016

The game began development in September 2011 by the same development team responsible for Dungeon Fighter Online, using the Gamebryo engine. In 2012, game publisher Nexon secured the rights to a Stand Alone Complex game from Kodansha. In 2013, Nexon planned to release the game in the first half of 2014. The first trailer for the game was unveiled during the G-STAR 2014 game exhibition in Busan. The title was revealed as Ghost in the Shell: First Connection Online. At the exhibition, representatives of Neople stated that the game will preserve the atmosphere of the original anime series as closely as possible. In 2015, the final title was revealed as Ghost in the Shell: Stand Alone Complex – First Assault Online.

A closed beta ran from October 1, 2015, to October 5, 2015. First Assault Online was released on Steam as an early access title on December 14, 2015. The game entered open beta on July 28, 2016. The game's public beta ended on July 1, 2017. There were six official servers in 1.0 and 5 by 2.0 (two of the servers merged due to lack of player base): America Empire East, America Empire West, European Union (Previously EU East and West in 1.0), Australia, South America. There was also a Japanese version of the game which had its own servers and development (some additional features were introduced such as clans and weapon rental). There was no support for LAN or private servers.

First Assault Online was due for a 2017 worldwide release on Steam, but due to the developers' rooted dissatisfaction with the game, both the Japanese and worldwide versions were discontinued. The game discontinued service in Japan on November 29, 2017. Item sales ended on September 6. Players with unused consumable items by November 29 were compensated with Nexon Points on December 13. It was announced on August 21 that the worldwide version would follow its Japanese counterpart and be discontinued. Upon notice of the discontinuation, all sales of DLC and in-game items ceased immediately. However, all weapons and attachments that could be purchased with in-game currency were lowered in price by 99%. The worldwide version officially closed on December 6, 2017.

== Reception ==
PC Gamer's Andy Kelly described an early iteration of the early access game as "a fairly basic FPS" and criticized interface elements and the choice to make a squad-based shooter instead of a role-playing game, though he praised First Assault Online's fidelity towards the anime. Rock Paper Shotgun said the game is "a conventional multiplayer shooter". Multiplayer.it gave a rating of five out of ten and called the game "generic".
