= Black Magic (manga) =

Japanese manga series

- DVD cover for the Black Magic M-66 OVA

ブラックマジック (Burakku Majikku)
- Manga
- Written by: Masamune Shirow
- Published by: Seishinsha
- English publisher: NA: Eclipse Comics (former) Dark Horse Comics
- Published: February 25, 1983
- Volumes: 1
- Original video animation

Black Magic M-66
- Directed by: Hiroyuki Kitakubo, Masamune Shirow
- Produced by: Makoto Asanuma, Nagateru Katō, Tōru Miura, Shūji Uchiyama
- Written by: Masamune Shirow
- Music by: Jōyō Katayanagi
- Studio: AIC
- Licensed by: NA: U.S. Renditions (former) Maiden Japan; UK: Manga Entertainment
- Released: June 28, 1987
- Runtime: 48 minutes
- Manga

Black Magic Ghost Drive
- Written by: Takuma Tomomasa
- Published by: Shueisha
- Magazine: Garaku no Mori
- Original run: May 7, 2016 – April 17, 2017
- Volumes: 2

Black Magic (ブラックマジック, Burakku Majikku) is a manga written and illustrated by Masamune Shirow. It was first published as a dōjinshi in 1983, and was later reprinted in tankōbon format by Seishinsha in 1985. The series was later adapted into an OVA, Black Magic M-66 (ブラックマジック M–66, Burakku Majikku Mario Shikkusuti Shikkusu), in 1987, which was directed by Hiroyuki Kitakubo. AIC and Animate provided the animation/production while Bandai Visual was chosen as the distributor. The OVA is loosely based on the Booby Trap chapters of the manga and centers around the efforts of a female journalist named Sybel, trying to save a young girl from an out-of-control military android created by the girl's grandfather.

== Plot ==
=== OVA ===
A military transport chopper is flying to an undisclosed location with secret cargo – two fully equipped, but un-programmed M-66 battle androids. It becomes apparent that the chopper is suffering from some sort of attack, as one of the turbines flares up before exploding. Both men evacuate the doomed craft and it crashes in a remote forest miles away from Center City, and both of the M-66's storage pods are thrown from the wreckage. The pods open as the M-66s automatically begin their mission. Sybel, a freelance journalist, receives an intercepted Military Broadband Transmission and loads up her equipment to go see what type of footage she can get of the event to sell to the major networks. She's joined by Leakey, her cameraman. Rushing to the scene of the accident, the two of them abandon their truck and try to sneak closer to the crash site, which has already been sealed and cordoned off by the military's retrieval teams.

The military's Special Ops Forces are directed by a professional soldier who is identified only as the 'Major', his status rank. Among the retrieval team is the assistant professor of the android's main design programmer. The M-66s are active searching out their target as well, this becomes apparent when the lead designer, Professor Matthews arrives at the site and talks to Professor Slade, his assistant. It seems that Slade loaded a 'dummy' program into the M-66s before they were transported, which mimics an actual mission engagement. Professor Matthews tells the Major that the SpecOps Forces must find and rescue his granddaughter Ferris, as she is the target the M-66s have been tasked with killing. The Major decides that the best course of action is to confront the androids on their way into the city area, and he sets a trap for both of the cunning machines.

Sybel and Leakey, meanwhile – had been captured by the SpecOps Forces in the forest, their equipment was taken, and they were arrested. Both were to be administered a shot of sodium pentothal – but only Leakey is given the shot- the android's arrival at the soldier's temporary base allows Sybel enough time to try to knock out the guard, but she is ineffective and he shouts at her to quit resisting. Another soldier walks over to their vehicle with a machine gun, and the guard shouts at him to watch Sybel and Leakey, before jumping out to run and join in the battle. Actually mortally wounded, the soldier falls forward and dies, and Sybel takes advantage of the situation to get herself and Leakey out of there. Despite the Major's best advances and planning, the androids engage his men and kill the majority of them, before his soldiers deploy a magnetic device which shuts down the androids for a limited time. Using the device, the soldiers manage to pin one of the M-66s on the hood of a transport vehicle and restrain it using nets. However, just before they can retrieve the android, it self-destructs, which propels 20,000 small-bore projectiles embedded within its skin in every direction. The Major's surviving forces turn their attention to the remaining M-66, which easily beats them back and then makes its own escape by jumping into the air and disappearing into the surrounding forest. Beaten, but not one to give up easily, the Major regroups his forces and calls for a transport craft to pick them up.

Sybel and Leakey make it back to their truck, and Sybel drops Leakey off with the film to go sell to the networks while she tries to get more information on what has happened. By accident, she discovers Professor Matthew's house deep in the forest. It has been ransacked by the surviving M-66. She then listens as a voicemail message begins playback. It is Professor Matthew's granddaughter Ferris saying that she will be home late and that she is out with friends at a restaurant in the city. Sybel realizes that the M-66 must have heard this same message and has gone to kill Ferris. In her haste, Sybel arrives at the restaurant and finds Ferris, who is reluctant to follow her. Sybel has to tell Ferris that the M-66 is there to kill her, and from then on, it's a fight to stay alive for both Sybel and Ferris- with help from the Major and his SpecOps Forces running defense against the unstoppable android.

Sybel and Ferris make their way up the skyscraper, pursued by the android as it dispatches the soldiers attempting to escort the pair. As they reach the roof, a fight between the M-66 and a gunship results in the top several floors of the building starting to collapse. As the android closes in, Sybel sets off explosive charges, propelling the M-66 off the tower. Sybel and Ferris are rescued by the military, and the remains of the M-66 are recovered. The Major decides not to arrest Sybel out of gratitude for her assistance, but does confiscate her equipment. Sybel returns home and turns on the news, where it's revealed the incident has been passed off as a terrorist attack. Leaky appears on the news, having sold the footage and taken full credit for it, only to realize too late that it includes video of him passed out in the truck. During the credits, scenes play out of Sybel filming various stories, before cutting to a lab where the now-inactive M-66 is placed back into a pod.

== OVA cast ==
Cast
Role	Japanese	English
Role	Japanese	Animaze (1995)
Sybel	Yoshiko Sakakibara	Lia Sargent
Major Arthur	Shinji Ogawa	Doug Stone
Ferris	Chisa Yokoyama	Melissa Fahn (as Melissa Charles)
Professor Slade	Mahito Tsujimura	Simon Prescott (as Simon Isaacson)
Professor Matthews	Ichiroo Nagai	Steve Blum
Richard Leakey	Yuu Mizushima	Gary Dubin
Nakamura	Kyooko Tonguu	Mimi Woods
Rico	Kazuyuki Sogabe	Beau Billingslea
Roger	Norio Wakamoto	Art Kimbro (as Tyrone Weeks)
Paco	Koozoo Shioya	Leonardo Araujo (as Leonardo Ardujo)

Additional voices:

- English: Dan Woren (as Jackson Daniels), Gloria Gines, Hank Crowell Jr. (as Arnie Hanks), Jan Rabson (as Stanley Gurd Jr.) Joe Romersa, Julie Maddalena (as Julie Kliewer), Kevin Seymour (as Dougary Grant), Kirk Thornton (as Spanky Roberts), Les Claypool III, Michael Sorich, Sonny Byrkett, Steve Bulen (as Stevie Beeline), Tom Fahn (as Tom Charles), Tony Pope (as Anthony Mozdy), Yiu Lee

== OVA production staff ==
- Directors: Hiroyuki Kitakubo, Masamune Shirow
- Writers: Hiroyuki Kitakubo, Masamune Shirow
- Music: Jōyō Katayanagi
- Director of Photography: Nobuo Koyama
- Art Director: Osamu Honda
- Character Designer: Hiroyuki Kitakubo
- Animation Director: Hiroyuki Okiura
- Sound Director: Yasunori Honda
- Producers: Makoto Asanuma, Nagateru Katō, Tōru Miura, Shūji Uchiyama

== Release ==
=== Manga ===
Black Magic was first released by Atlas magazine in 1983 and then reprinted in 1984. The story was republished by Seishinsha in 1985. An English translation of Black Magic was released in four parts by Eclipse Comics in 1990. An English language trade paperback version of the story was released by Dark Horse Comics in 1998 and reprinted in 2008.

A reboot, titled Black Magic Ghost Drive, was published on Shueisha's (Homesha's) web platform Garaku no Mori from May 7, 2016 to April 17, 2017 and collected in two volumes released on April 19 and May 17, 2019. Set in Japan in the year 2100, where artificial intelligence is deeply integrated into everyday life, the series follows Azusa, a girl who acquires the ability to directly interface with electronic circuits, and Maria, an android, as they confront a mysterious terrorist organization. Masamune Shirow is credited with the original work, while Takuma Tomomasa is credited as the manga artist.

=== OVA ===
An English subtitled version of the OVA was released in VHS format in 1991 by U.S. Renditions. An English dubbed version of the OVA was released in VHS format by Manga Entertainment 1995, and later in DVD format in 2001. An English subtitled version in DVD and digital distribution formats was released in 2013 by Maiden Japan.

== Reception ==
=== Manga ===
Greg Hackmann's review of Black Magic for The Fandom Post compliments the manga's artwork but criticizes the narrative, and concludes that the story doesn't have much appeal outside of being Masamune Shirow's first work.

=== OVA ===
In his 2013 review of the OVA Theron Martin from Anime News Network said that the series had a "dated look" to it. Martin also praised the character designs though along with the android action giving the overall subtitled OVA a B− grade. Carlos Ross from THEM Anime Reviews gave the OVA a 3/5 star rating calling it "not a bad effort by any means". In his review Ross compared the villains in Black Magic to those in Terminator 2: Judgment Day for their lack of humanity which adds to their terrifying nature. He goes on to recommend the OVA for an audience that likes graphic violence.

The Encyclopedia of Science Fiction described Black Magic M-66 as an enjoyable, violent and action-oriented anime, noting the influence of The Terminator and praising its determined female protagonist and effective android antagonists. It criticized the limited characterization and elements of fan service, but noted that the story avoids some genre clichés, particularly by not portraying the military as either brutal or incompetent. The encyclopedia also highlighted the use of magnets against the androids as an interesting element, while criticizing several implausibilities in the plot, especially the decision to program the experimental assassins to target their creator's granddaughter.
