= Ghost in the Shell: Stand Alone Complex (2004 video game) =

PS2 video game

- PAL cover art
- Developer: Cavia (Note: Additional work by Sony Computer Entertainment Japan.)
- Publisher: Sony Computer Entertainment: NA/EU: Bandai
- Directors: Yōichi Take; Yuji Shimomura
- Producers: Takuya Iwasaki; Takayasu Yanagihara
- Designers: Tadayuki Hoshino; Naoshige Kamamoto
- Programmers: Masashi Kobayashi; Shinya Abe; Katsumi Murata
- Artists: Makoto Shimomura; Masayuki Suzuki; Shinobu Tsuneki
- Writers: Dai Satō; Yoshiki Sakurai; Midori Goto
- Composer: Nobuyoshi Sano
- Series: Ghost in the Shell
- Platform: PlayStation 2
- Release: JP: March 4, 2004; NA: November 8, 2004; PAL: May 6, 2005
- Genre: Shooter
- Mode: Single-player multiplayer

Ghost in the Shell: Stand Alone Complex (Note: Japanese: 攻殻機動隊 STAND ALONE COMPLEX, Hepburn: Kōkaku Kidōtai Sutando Arōn Konpurekkusu) is a third-person shooter video game developed by Cavia and published by Sony Computer Entertainment for the PlayStation 2. It is based on the cyberpunk anime of the same name. The game was released from March 2004 to May 2005, with the game having its own original soundtrack album released 1 day before its Japanese release. It was Sony's second video game based on the franchise, with a previous game for the PlayStation being the first.

== Gameplay ==
The game's playable characters include Motoko Kusanagi and Batou. Levels are separated along with the two parallel parts of the Section 9 investigation that forms the basis of the storyline, with some sections following Batou's experiences and others recounting Kusanagi's solo journey to the region where the plot appears to originate from. Gameplay uses a third-person perspective, and players use a variety of weapons, including the ability to ghost-hack opponents, in order to progress. Kusanagi's levels tend to require the player to use her agility to progress to a much greater degree than Batou's levels, which tend to feature a focus on more heavy firepower. Media response was generally positive, but reserved, citing the high-quality graphics and enjoyable, action-packed gameplay but noting the slightly awkward controls, lack of any real innovation and the failure to use the license to its full potential, for example not using hacking as a more advanced, useful or integral gameplay feature.

== Plot ==
The games take place in the year 2030, between the stories told in Ghost in the Shell: Stand Alone Complex and Ghost in the Shell: S.A.C. 2nd GIG. In the year 2030, cybercrime, espionage and terrorism plague a society lost between humanity and technology. As one of the trusted members of the government organization known as Section 9, Major Motoko Kusanagi must uncover the truth behind a mysterious case known only as T.A.R.

After Section 9 seized the black market of surplus weaponry of the Japan Self-Defense Force in Nihama Port, the suspect died from an unknown reason. During Batou's investigation, he found out the suspect was doing a transport work of a batch of micromachine rice. And then Section 9 traced the track to the old military research complex called "Tohoku Autonomous Region". Therefore, Batou and Motoko infiltrate the facility to reveal the conspiracy behind those rice.

== Development and release ==
The game was developed by Cavia. A total of 50 developers worked on the game. The game's story was written in 6 months and took 15 months to develop. Masamune Shirow assisted in the conceptual stages of the game. Cavia wanted the game to be faithful to the original TV series, but also chose a design that allowed them to enhance the personalities of Motoko Kusanagi and Batou. Music was produced by Cavia with sound effects from the Stand Alone Complex anime having been used in collaboration with Production I.G.

In November 2004, Bandai and Atari Europe announced that they would respectively publish and distribute a localized version of the game in Europe.

== Reception ==
Reception

Aggregate score
Aggregator	Score
Metacritic	66/100

Review scores
Publication	Score
Famitsu	29/40
Game Informer	7.25/10
GameSpot	6.1/10
GameZone	7/10
IGN	7/10
Jeuxvideo.com	11/20
PlayStation Official Magazine – UK	4/10
Official U.S. PlayStation Magazine	2/5
PlayStation: The Official Magazine	7/10
X-Play	2/5
The Sydney Morning Herald	3/5

The game received "average" reviews according to the review aggregation website Metacritic. In Japan, Famitsu gave it a score of two sevens, one eight, and one seven for a total of 29 out of 40. It sold 45,528 copies a week after its release in Japan.
