= Yoshiki Sakurai =

Japanese anime and film screenwriter

- 櫻井圭記
- Born: 9 June 1977 (age 49); Tochigi, Japan
- Occupation: screenwriter

Yoshiki Sakurai (櫻井圭記, Sakurai Yoshiki; born 9 June 1977) is a Japanese screenwriter and producer.

== Career ==
Sakurai was born in Tochigi, Japan. He returned there when he was 13, and graduated from University of Tokyo majoring in economics. His theses on Japanese animation and subculture won several awards. While still a college student, he wrote eight episodes of the anime television series Ghost in the Shell: Stand Alone Complex. After graduation, he was employed at Production I.G. and wrote for the second series, Ghost in the Shell: S.A.C. 2nd GIG, and for the TV movie Ghost in the Shell: Stand Alone Complex – Solid State Society.

== Filmography ==
=== Anime ===
- Ghost in the Shell: Stand Alone Complex (Screenwriter; eps 3, 8, 11, 12, 15, 17, 24, 25)
- Ghost in the Shell: S.A.C. 2nd GIG (Screenwriter; eps 1, 10, 14, 24)
- Yu-Gi-Oh! Duel Monsters (Screenwriter; ep 124)
- Moribito: Guardian of the Spirit (Screenwriter; eps 3, 8, 12, 16, 20, 24)
- Blood+ (Screenwriter; eps 3, 11, 20)
- xxxHolic (Screenwriter; eps 2, 5, 9, 13, 19, SP)
- xxxHolic:Kei (Screenwriter; ep7)
- Otogi Zoshi (Chief Screenwriter; eps 1, 6, 13, 18, 24, 26)
- Real Drive (Screenwriter; eps 8, 10, 17, 24)
- Appleseed XIII (Screenwriter; eps 2, 4, 10, 13)
- Recovery of an MMO Junkie (executive producer)
- Ojarumaru (Screenwriter; from 10th season)

=== Feature films ===
- Ghost in the Shell: Stand Alone Complex – Solid State Society (Screenwriter)
- xxxHolic: A Midsummer Night's Dream (Screenwriter)
- Evangelion: 1.0 You Are (Not) Alone (Screenplay Cooperation)
- Evangelion: 2.0 You Can (Not) Advance (Screenplay Cooperation)
- Musashi: The Dream of the Last Samurai (Storyboard)
- Redline (Screenwriter)
- Giovanni's Island (Screenwriter, Producer)
- CYBORG009 CALL OF JUSTICE (Producer)
- colorful ninja iromaki (Producer)
- Napping Princess (Producer)

== Bibliography ==
- Kutikula (manga)
- Tachikomatic Days (manga)
- God Voice (manga)
- Philosophia Robotica (critique)
