= Real Drive =

Japanese anime series

- Title card for Real Drive

RD 潜脳調査室 (Āru Dī Sennō Chōsashitsu)
- Created by: Production I.G; Masamune Shirow
- Anime television series
- Directed by: Kazuhiro Furuhashi
- Produced by: Takeshi Wada (Production I.G); Toshio Nakatani (NTV); Yasuo Ueda (VAP); Yousuke Kasahara
- Written by: Junichi Fujisaku
- Music by: Yoshihisa Hirano; Hideki Taniuchi
- Studio: Production I.G
- Original network: Nippon TV
- Original run: April 8, 2008 – October 1, 2008
- Episodes: 26
- Manga
- Written by: Production I.G; Masamune Shirow (original work)
- Illustrated by: Momotarou Miyano
- Published by: Kodansha
- Magazine: Magazine Z
- Original run: April 26, 2008 – January 26, 2009
- Volumes: 2
- Light novel

Real Drive: Redeemable Dream
- Written by: Production I.G; Masamune Shirow (original work); Yoshinobu Akita
- Published by: Kodansha
- Published: August 5, 2008
- Volumes: 1

Real Drive (Japanese: RD 潜脳調査室, Hepburn: Āru Dī Sennō Chōsashitsu; literally "RD Mind-Diving Research Division") is an anime TV series created by Production I.G and Masamune Shirow (known for the Ghost in the Shell and Appleseed franchises) under the directorship of Kazuhiro Furuhashi, produced in collaboration with broadcaster Nippon Television (NTV). The series revolves around an information network known as "The Metal", and the series centers on Masamichi Haru, a paraplegic old man who was in a coma for 50 years after a test dive using Meta-Real technology went horribly wrong. After awakening from his coma, he starts searching for the "answer in the sea".

The series aired on NTV and other channels from April 8, 2008, to October 1, 2008. A manga adaptation by Momotarou Miyano was serialized in Magazine Z from April 2008 to January 2009, with two volumes sold between August 22, 2008, and February 23, 2009, by Kodansha. A light novel adaptation by Yoshinobu Akita was published by Kodansha on August 5, 2008.

== Plot ==
2061 AD. Fifty years have passed since mankind developed the Network society. It was anticipated that this new infrastructure would realize a utopia where people connected with each other at the level of consciousness. However, new social problems such as personal data leaks and proliferation of manipulated information began to surface. Nevertheless, people still relied on the Network to exchange information, and proved unable to opt to abandon it.

In due course, a new Network realm with more effective security measures was developed. This was called Meta-Real Network, usually abbreviated as "the Metal".

The Metal accommodated personal memory data within protected virtual stand-alone organic cyber enclaves called bubble shells and eventually pervaded the everyday lives of people.

However, people gradually learned to release and explore their instincts within the secure environment of the Metal. The unleashed instincts of each individual pushed their consciousness to drown in the sea of information and be exposed to the pressures of desire. Meanwhile, norms and regulations continued to bind their real world lives. Thus, strange friction between the two worlds began to manifest themselves as aberrations beyond the bounds of the imaginable. Experts who challenged the deep sea of the Metal to investigate and decipher such aberrations were called cyber divers.

This is a story of a cyber diver, Masamichi Haru, who investigates the incidents that lie between Reality and the Metal.

== Characters ==
=== Main characters ===
The main characters of Real Drive, from left to right: Holon, Minamo Aoi, Masamichi Haru, Souta Aoi, and Eiichiro Kushima

Masamichi Haru (波留 真理, Haru Masamichi)
Voiced by: Katsuji Mori
The protagonist of the series. A diver of the Metal and longtime friend of Eiichiro Kushima. Masamichi was in a diving accident while testing an early Meta-Real technology, and was in a coma for 50 years before awakening as a paraplegic old man. Since the incident, he began searching for the "answer in the sea". Towards the end of the series, he eventually regains his ability to walk.
Minamo Aoi (蒼井 ミナモ, Aoi Minamo)
Voiced by: Kanae Oki
An intern hired by Masamichi Haru and sister of Souta Aoi. Originally hired to replace Holon during a leave for maintenance, she became a permanent employee after she helped guide Masamichi back from a dive gone wrong. Unlike the other humans and some animals in the story, she does not possess a Cyberbrain augmentation, and requires electronic accessories to access the Metal.
Souta Aoi (蒼井 ソウタ, Aoi Sōta)
Voiced by: Hiroki Takahashi, Aiko Aihashi (child)
Employee of the EISF and brother of Minamo Aoi. He begins to have feelings for Holon towards the end of the series.
Holon (ホロン, Horon)
Voiced by: Ayako Kawasumi
A Gynoid who helps Masamichi Haru with daily life in his old age and assists him in his search for the "answer in the sea".
Eiichiro Kushima (久島 永一朗, Kushima Eīchirō)
Voiced by: Keiji Fujiwara
The director of the Electronics Industry Physical and Chemical Research Institute and friend of Masamichi Haru. While as old as Masamichi, his body has the appearance of a 28-year-old man. It was revealed later in the series that Kushima chose to replace his original body with a prosthetic one, allowing him to continue his work beyond the limits allowed by the human body. He has a spare body to which he transfers his consciousness during his usual body's maintenance, one which might be modeled after the young Haru (Minamo remarked in episode 20 that his spare's appearance reminded her of Haru in his youth).

=== Supporting characters ===
Erica Patricia Takanami (エリカ=パトリシア=タカナミ, Erika Patorishia Takanami)
Voiced by: Hiromi Tsuru
The Chairwoman and First Princess of Artificial Island, Secretary General of the Council, and Souta's love interest. It is later revealed that Holon is modeled after her.
Jenny Yen (ジェニー=円, Jenī En)
Voiced by: Naoya Uchida
The Chairman of the Council's Advisory Committee. Like Kushima, he, too, has a prosthetic body, but it has been upgraded for military use and is armed with a stun gun.
Mamoru Aoi (蒼井 衛, Aoi Mamoru)
Voiced by: Takashi Matsuyama
The father of the Aoi siblings and chief of the Technical Section in the Department of Management at Denriken. Following an incident that occurred when the Metal crashed in episode 9, he resigns from his post and works as one of the lab researchers.

=== Other characters ===
Operators
Voiced by: Ayako Kawasumi
Androids employed at Denriken who control and monitor the Divers' status, as well as sudden changes within the Metal. Like Holon, they all take the same appearance as Takanami.
Ayumu Fujiwara (フジワラ アユム, Fujiwara Ayumu)
Voiced by: Kazuki Yao
Eugene Fujiwara (フジワラ ユージン, Fujiwara Yūjin)
Voiced by: Kenji Hamada
Mizuho Aoi (蒼井 ミズホ, Aoi Mizuho)
Voiced by: Yūko Mizutani
Souta and Minamo's mother.
Yoko Aoi (蒼井 洋子, Aoi Yōko)
Voiced by: Junko Midori
Souta and Minamo's grandmother.
Sayaka Mikomoto (神子元 サヤカ, Mikomoto Sayaka)
Voiced by: Akeno Watanabe
Minamo's classmate.
Yukino Ito (伊東 ユキノ, Itō Yukino)
Voiced by: Ai Nonaka
Minamo's classmate.

== Media ==
=== Anime ===
Real Drive is produced by Production I.G under the directorship of Kazuhiro Furuhashi, with series composition by Junichi Fujisaku, music by Hideki Taniuchi and Yoshihisa Hirano, characters by Tetsuo Ueyama, and produced by Takeshi Wada (Production I.G), Toshio Nakatani (NTV), Yasuo Ueda (Vap), and Yousuke Kasahara. The series aired 26 episodes on NTV, with subsequent broadcast runs on GyaO, STV, CTV, Animax, FBS, YTV, TV. Shinshu, and Tochigi TV. Thirteen DVD compilation volumes, each containing two episodes, were released by VAP between August 27, 2008, and August 21, 2009, with four DVD "Collector's Boxes" released between August 27, 2009, and May 22, 2009. The Collector's Boxes includes three to four disks, each containing two episodes, along with other bonus material.

The opening theme for the series is "Wanderland" by 9mm Parabellum Bullet, while the series' ending theme is "Katahiza no Yogore" (片膝の汚れ; "Dirty Knee") by Last Alliance.

=== Manga ===
A manga adaptation of Real Drive, illustrated by Momotarou Miyano, was serialized in Magazine Z from the June 2008 issue (Published on April 26, 2008) to the March 2009 issue (Published on January 26, 2009). Two bound volumes were released by Kodansha between August 22, 2008, and February 23, 2009, under their Kodansha Comics Z imprint.

=== Light novel ===
A light novel adaptation, called Real Drive: Redeemable Dream (RD 潜脳調査室 Redeemable Dream, Āru Dī Sennō Chōsashitsu: Redīmaburu Dorīmu), written by Yoshinobu Akita, was published by Kodansha on August 4, 2008.
