= Ghost in the Shell 2: Innocence =

2004 film by Mamoru Oshii

- Theatrical release poster
- Directed by: Mamoru Oshii
- Screenplay by: Mamoru Oshii
- Based on: Ghost in the Shell by Masamune Shirow
- Produced by: Mitsuhisa Ishikawa; Toshio Suzuki
- Starring: Akio Ōtsuka; Atsuko Tanaka; Koichi Yamadera; Naoto Takenaka
- Cinematography: Miki Sakuma
- Edited by: Sachiko Miki; Chihiro Nakano; Junichi Uematsu
- Music by: Kenji Kawai
- Production company: Production I.G
- Distributed by: Toho
- Release date: March 6, 2004 (Japan)
- Running time: 98 minutes
- Country: Japan
- Language: Japanese
- Budget: $20 million
- Box office: $10.1 million

Ghost in the Shell 2: Innocence, known in Japan as just Innocence (Japanese: イノセンス, Hepburn: Inosensu), is a 2004 Japanese animated cyberpunk film written and directed by Mamoru Oshii. The film serves as a standalone sequel to Ghost in the Shell (1995), and is based on the 1989-91 manga of the same name by Masamune Shirow, loosely adapting the manga chapter "Robot Rondo".

Ghost in the Shell 2: Innocence was released in Japan on March 6, 2004, by Toho. The film received the 2004 Nihon SF Taisho Award, and was nominated for four Annie Awards. It was also in competition at the 2004 Cannes Film Festival, making it the first and only anime in history to compete for the Palme d'Or. The soundtrack for the film was released under the name Innocence O.S.T. and a related novel called Ghost in the Shell: Innocence - After the Long Goodbye was released on February 29, 2004.

== Plot ==
In 2032, three years after Major Motoko Kusanagi disappeared, (Note: As depicted at the ending of Ghost in the Shell (1995)) Public Security Section 9 cybernetic operative Batou is teamed with Togusa, an agent with very few cybernetic upgrades. Section 9 is asked to investigate a series of deaths due to malfunctioning gynoids (doll-like sex robots). Since the gynoids all malfunctioned without clear cause, the deaths are believed to be premeditated murders; Batou and Togusa are sent to investigate possible terrorist or political motives. Additionally, the most recent gynoid's remains show they all contained an illegal "ghost". Section 9 concludes human sentience is being artificially duplicated onto the dolls illegally, making the robots more lifelike, and possibly acting as a motive in the murders.

Called to a homicide scene, information warfare and technology specialist Ishikawa explains the victim is Jack Walkson, a consignment officer at gynoid company LOCUS SOLUS, who may have been killed by the yakuza. A previous yakuza boss was recently killed by a gynoid, so Ishikawa concludes Walkson was held responsible and killed in an act of revenge. Batou and Togusa enter a yakuza bar to question the current boss, only to be threatened by the bar occupants. Batou opens fire, killing and wounding numerous gang members, including the cyborg that murdered Walkson. The current boss then admits his predecessor was somehow involved in LOCUS SOLUS, but insists he does not know how.

Entering a store on his way home, Batou is then seemingly warned by the Major and shot in the arm by an unseen assailant. Caught in a firefight, Batou nearly kills the store owner in confusion, but is subdued when Ishikawa appears. While having his damaged arm replaced, Batou is informed by Ishikawa that his e-brain was hacked, causing him to shoot himself and attack the store occupants. Ishikawa explains that Batou was hacked in order to cause further scandal following his yakuza assault in an attempt to stop the Section 9 investigation.

Batou and Togusa then head for the former Etorofu Special Economic Zone, where the mansion of Kim, a former soldier-turned-hacker with an obsession with dolls, is located. Seemingly dead, Kim soon reveals he "lives" inside the shell of a human-sized marionette, and discusses philosophy with his visitors. Kim admits ties to LOCUS SOLUS, divulging that the company has secret headquarters in international waters. Warned again by the Major, Batou realizes that Kim has secretly hacked into his and Togusa's e-brains, and is currently trapping them in a false reality. Resetting Togusa's brain, Batou subdues Kim, stating he knows Kim hacked his brain in the store.

Resolved to gather material evidence, Batou infiltrates the LOCUS SOLUS headquarters ship while Togusa remotely hacks its security systems using an unaware Kim as a proxy. The ship's security becomes aware of the hacking and retaliates with a virus that fries Kim's cyberbrain. Simultaneously, a hidden virus loads a combat program into the production-line gynoids, causing them to attack everyone aboard, easily slaughtering the poorly armed and panicked security force. As Batou fights to the ship's center, the Major then appears by controlling a gynoid remotely, helping Batou fight the gynoids and hack the ship's security.

Taking control of the ship, the Major reveals to Batou the truth about the gynoids. Hiring the yakuza to traffic young girls, LOCUS SOLUS duplicated their consciousnesses into the gynoids, giving them human "ghosts" to make them more realistic. Batou rescues a young girl from a "ghost dubbing" machine, and she explains that Jack Walkson, having learned the truth about LOCUS SOLUS, promised to save the girls by tampering with the ghosting process. This caused the gynoids to murder their owners, allowing Walkson to attract police attention and indirectly kill the yakuza boss. Despite Walkson's actions saving the girls, Batou objects that he also victimized the gynoids as well, causing them severe distress by giving them damaged ghosts. Having solved the case, Batou asks the Major if she is happy now. She responds that she will always be beside him on the network, then disconnects from the gynoid.

== Voice cast ==
Character	Japanese	English	
Character	Japanese	Epcar/Manga/Madman (2005)	Animaze/Bandai (2009)
Batou	Akio Ōtsuka	Richard Epcar	Richard Epcar
Motoko Kusanagi	Atsuko Tanaka	Mary Elizabeth McGlynn	Mary Elizabeth McGlynn
Togusa	Kōichi Yamadera	Crispin Freeman	Crispin Freeman
Daisuke Aramaki	Tamio Ōki	William Frederick Knight	William Frederick Knight
Ishikawa	Yutaka Nakano	Michael McCarty	Michael McCarty
Azuma	Masaki Terasoma	Erik Davies	Erik Davies
Kim	Naoto Takenaka	Joey D'Auria	Travis Willingham
Haraway	Yoshiko Sakakibara	Ellyn Stern	Barbara Goodson
Koga	Hiroaki Hirata	Robert Axelrod	Fred Sanders
Forensics Chief	Katsunosuke Hori	Terrence Stone	Loy Edge
Lin	Sukekiyo Kameyama	Robert Axelrod	Doug Stone
Rescued Girl	Hisami Muto	Sherry Lynn	Laura Bailey
Katsunari Wakabayashi	Ryuji Nakagi	Richard Cansino	Steve Kramer

=== Additional English voices ===
==== Epcar/Manga/Madman cast ====
- Richard Cansino as Man, Security 1, Yakuza 1
- Steve Kramer as Detective, Security 4, Security 5
- Sherry Lynn as Gynoid
- Terrence Stone as Pilot, Security 2, Shop Owner, Yakuza 3
- Michael McConnohie as Forensics Staff, Section 9 Member, Security 3
- Bob Papenbrook as Crab Man, Cyborg Doctor, Underwater Cyborg, Yakuza 2
- Stephanie Sheh as Dispatcher, Togusa's Daughter
- Kevin Seymour (as Mr. X) as Yakuza 4

==== Animaze/Bandai cast ====
- Karen Huie as Locus Solus Security System #1 (Cantonese)
- Jim Lau as Locus Solus Security System #2 (Cantonese)
- Joe Romersa as Crab Man, Undersea Cyborg
- John Snyder as Cyborg Arm Doctor
- David Vincent as SWAT Commander, Yakuza 1
- Kyle Hebert as Detective
- Roger Craig Smith as Briefing Voice, Yamadori Transport Pilot
- Sandy Fox as Togusa's Daughter

== Allusions and references ==
Innocence contains many references to fantasy, philosophy and Zen, and addresses aesthetic and moral questions. For example, the film begins with a quotation from Auguste Villiers de l'Isle-Adam's Tomorrow's Eve from 1886: "If our Gods and our hopes are nothing but scientific phenomena, then let us admit it must be said that our love is scientific as well." Other numerous quotations in the film come from Buddha, Confucius, Descartes, the Old Testament, Meiji-era critic Saitō Ryokuu, Richard Dawkins, Max Weber, Jacob Grimm, Plato, John Milton, 14th-century playwright Zeami Motokiyo, the Tridentine Mass, and Julien Offray de La Mettrie, French Enlightenment philosopher and author of Man a Machine.

The characters and their names contain many allusions to other older works. For example, the "Hadaly" model robots refer to a human-like robot named Hadaly featured in Tomorrow's Eve, also the book that popularized the word android. The company LOCUS SOLUS is named for the 1914 novel by Raymond Roussel, which also shares certain thematic elements with the film, such as a mansion containing tableaux vivants. The police forensic specialist, Haraway, is most likely named for Donna Haraway, feminist author of A Cyborg Manifesto. Haraway's character is likely based on Susan Calvin from Asimov's Robot series. The Robot series is also referenced in the film's androids as they comply with a modified version of Asimov's Third Law of Robotics.

Dolls are also an important motif in Innocence; many have "spirits" of some sort, but at the same time are not quite human. They are based on the art of Hans Bellmer, a dollmaker famous for his disturbing, erotic ball-jointed female dolls.

The parade sequence is based on a religious procession and a temple in Taiwan.

In the 2009 English dub, the murdered consignment inspector is called Jacques Vaucanson. His namesake was an 18th-century French inventor who created automata in the image of man and of animals.

== Production ==
Innocence had a production budget of approximately $20 million (approximately 2 billion yen). To raise the sum, Production I.G studio's president, Mitsuhisa Ishikawa, asked Studio Ghibli's president, Toshio Suzuki, to co-produce. Polygon Pictures produced the 3DCG in the film.

=== Director's ideas ===
On the origins of the movie, director Mamoru Oshii says he didn't envision it solely as a sequel to Ghost in the Shell. He said, "I had a dozen ideas, linked to my views on life, my philosophy, that I wanted to include in this film ... I attacked Innocence as a technical challenge; I wanted to go beyond typical animation limits, answer personal questions and at the same time appeal to filmgoers." During production, the first decision Oshii made was to not make Motoko Kusanagi the main character and instead make it a story about someone searching for her. Oshii chose to make the movie have a different tone and feel from the original.

Oshii traveled the world in order to find inspirations for the film. Oshii based the appearance on the dolls created by Hans Bellmer he saw at the International Center of Photography in New York. He credited Jean-Luc Godard for the idea of including quotes by other authors: "[The texts] ... give a certain richness to cinema because the visual is not all there is. Thanks to Godard, the spectator can concoct his own interpretation ... The image associated with the text is a unifying act that aims at renewing cinema, that let's [sic] it take to new dimensions."

Oshii noted his attention to detail might be particularly Japanese: "I get absorbed in the finer points – like what the back of a bottle label looks like when you see it through the glass [demonstrates with a bottle of mineral water]. That's very Japanese, I suppose. I want people to go back to the film again and again to pick up things they missed the first time." Describing the overall look, the director said, "The film is set in the future, but it's looking at present-day society. And as I said, there's an autobiographical element as well. I'm looking back at some of the things I liked as a child — the 1950s cars and so on. Basically, I wanted to create a different world — not a future world."

The dog Gabriel, looking once more like the only "real" being, makes a key appearance, as in many of Oshii's movies. A scene with Batou feeding his dog is echoed in Ash in Avalon (2001). He explained the reason why all his films feature a basset hound—his companion in real life: "This body you see before you is an empty shell. The dog represents my body. Human beings can be free only if they free themselves from their bodies. When I am playing around with my dog, I forget that I am a human being, and it's only then that I feel free."

As for the state of art and animation, Oshii had this to say:

I think that Hollywood is relying more and more on 3D imaging like that of Shrek. The strength behind Japanese animation is based in the designer's pencil. Even if he mixes 2D, 3D, and computer graphics, the foundation is still 2D. Only doing 3D does not interest me.

On the overall message of the film, the director said "This movie ... concludes that all forms of life – humans, animals and robots – are equal. In this day and age when everything is uncertain, we should all think about what to value in life and how to coexist with others." On his narrative intentions Oshii comments: "I had a bigger budget than for Ghost in the Shell. I also had more time to prepare it. Yet despite the economic leeway, abundant details and orientations, it was still important to tell an intimate story."

=== Title change ===
In order to better market the film outside Japan, the Ghost in the Shell 2 moniker was added to the title of the film, with Innocence becoming the subtitle. Some fans saw this as conflicting with Oshii's statements that the film wasn't, in actuality, a standard Hollywood-esque sequel, and was able to, and intended to, stand on its own.

=== English-language dub ===
When Go Fish Pictures released Innocence, they released it subtitled, without English dubbing, a controversial choice since every Ghost in the Shell anime released by Manga Entertainment outside of Japan had been dubbed. Anime News Network announced Manga Entertainment UK's co-production of an English dub with Madman Entertainment, their Australian distributor and longtime partner, and Richard Epcar's (the voice of Batou) Epcar Entertainment studio for the dubbing. This was the first dub Manga UK had produced since X in 1999 and the first dub Madman produced. This dub was released in the UK by Manga and in Australia by Madman Entertainment (using the Go Fish Pictures transfer). Bandai Entertainment under license from Paramount and DreamWorks created a second dub for the North American market using most of the voice actors from the Manga/Madman version making some changes to the cast and production team and using Animaze's studio.

== Related media ==
=== Soundtrack ===
Innocence O.S.T.

Soundtrack album by Kenji Kawai
- Released: 2004-03-03; 2005-09-13 (UPC 669198251900)
- Genres: New-age, ambient
- Length: 47
- Label: Bandai Entertainment
- Producer: Kenji Kawai

The soundtrack was composed by Kenji Kawai, who also composed the 1995 Ghost in the Shell soundtrack. As he expressed in the liner notes, he agreed with Mamoru Oshii that the soundtrack pattern itself somewhat after and "would follow the music from the original film." Additionally, Oshii made specific requests for "a huge music box," a "jazzy theme," and a "reprise of the song 'Follow Me'".

The music box, heard in the "Doll House" tracks, was procured from Sankyo Shoji. Wanting it to sound as if played in a huge space, Kenji Kawai had the music box recorded in studio, and then played back in the underground quarry of Ohya with four speakers and two subwoofers, where it was recorded with eight microphones.

The minyoh singers chorus, heard in the "Chants" in the first movie, and in the "Ballade of Puppets" in Innocence, was expanded to include 75 performers, which proved challenging to record. The session lasted for 14 straight hours.

"Follow Me" is a reprise of a song originally interpreted by Demis Roussos in 1982 and covered by Kimiko Itoh. The music is based on Joaquín Rodrigo's Concierto de Aranjuez, with lyrics by Herbert Kretzmer and Hal Shaper.

Ghost in the Shell 2: Innocence O.S.T. track listing
No.	Title	Length
1.	"Dungeon"	1:22
2.	"The Ballade of Puppets: Flowers Grieve and Fall"	3:38
3.	"Type 2052 "Hadaly""	4:05
4.	"River of Crystals"	5:47
5.	"Attack the Wakabayashi"	3:29
6.	"Etorofu"	3:53
7.	"The Ballade of Puppets: In a New World Gods Will Descend"	5:09
8.	"The Doll House I"	1:31
9.	"The Doll House II"	2:54
10.	"The Ballade of Puppets: The Ghost Awaits in the World Beyond"	9:44
11.	"Toh Kami Emi Tame"	0:31
12.	"Follow Me¹"	5:01
Total length:		47:04

¹ - covered by Kimiko Itoh

=== Novel ===
A novel by Masaki Yamada called Innocence: After the Long Goodbye (イノセンス After the Long Goodbye) serves as a prequel, taking place just before the film and told from Batou's perspective as he searches for his dog Gabriel (Gabu). It was published by Tokuma Shoten on February 29, 2004, and the English-language version was published by Viz Media in the US in October 2005. Viz media later released a four-volume Ani-manga boxset in April 2005.

=== Music anthology ===
A music anthology disc based on the film was released by Bandai Entertainment in July 2005, consisting of music videos animated by Production I.G.

== Reception ==
Critical reception of Ghost in the Shell 2: Innocence has been generally positive. Review aggregator website Rotten Tomatoes reported that 65% of critics have given a positive review based on 99 reviews, with an average rating of 6.3/10. The consensus states: "The animation is lovely, but the plot is complex to the point of inscrutability, leaving Ghost in the Shell 2: Innocence both original and numbing." On Metacritic, it has a weighted average score of 68 out of 100 based on 27 critics, indicating "generally favorable reviews".

The film was praised by Manohla Dargis of the New York Times, who wrote "Innocence doesn't just reveal a wealth of visual enchantments; it restates the case that there can and should be more to feature-length animations than cheap jokes, pathos and pandering." In contrast, criticism rests upon a number of factors, often cited to be overly heavy on philosophical dialogue and thus hard to follow, and its ending has been described as weak and unmeaningful in the arc of character development. Helen McCarthy in 500 Essential Anime Movies praises the quality script and direction, stating that "it's a challenging film, but it's one of the best anime ever".

Dominic Laeno of THEM Anime Reviews gave Ghost in the Shell 2 a perfect 5-star review, deeming it to be a massive improvement over the first film. Laeno handed out praise for the soundtrack by Kenji Kawai, which he deemed as superior to the original, as well as the presentation of the dialogue, the story, the film’s overall message, while only handing out criticism for the 2D animation, which he felt was a slight downgrade compared to the first film’s. Overall, Laeno concluded that the movie was "very thought provoking, and utterly mesmerizing in its incredible beauty in direction and in message", and that "this is simply a brilliant film." Carlo Santos of Anime News Network gave Ghost in the Shell 2 a B rating, handing out praise for the animation, artwork, soundtrack, and story but criticized the pacing and the dialogue, claiming that it makes it difficult to relate to the characters of the film. Santos ultimately concluded that the film "has its merits, primarily as a showcase of animation pushed to the limits of beauty and complexity."

=== Accolades ===
Honored best sci-fi film at the 2004 Nihon SF Taisho Awards, Innocence competed at the 2004 Cannes Film Festival, only the sixth animated film to be featured at Cannes ever. Along with Persepolis, it was the only animated feature to be screened in the official selection, competing for the Palme d'Or that year.

Innocence also received four Annie Award nominations including Best Animated Feature and Best Achievement in Directing, tying with Spirited Away, Millennium Actress, and Weathering with You to have four nominations; as of 2023, this stands as the join second-highest for an anime film at the Annies, behind its predecessor Ghost in the Shell (1995) and Belle (2021) with five.

== Release ==
=== Japan ===
The movie was released on VHS and DVD by Buena Vista Home Entertainment Japan (later Walt Disney Studios Japan) on September 15, 2004. A UMD version was later released in 2005, and an "International Version" DVD was released on September 7, 2005, which contained multi-language subtitles. the movie was released on Blu-ray Disc on December 6, 2006.

An "Absolute Edition" was released by Disney on Blu-Ray on August 6, 2008.

Walt Disney Japan released the 4K remaster of the film on Ultra HD Blu-ray and regular Blu-ray Disc on June 22, 2018. To tie in with this release alongside the first movie's 4K remaster's Ultra HD release. On the same day, Bandai Namco Arts and Disney teamed up to release an Ultra HD Blu-Ray combo pack containing both movies for a limited time.

=== North America ===
Innocence ranked 28th at the US box office earning $317,000 on its opening weekend in September 2004. The film eventually grossed $1 million in US box office, which completely exceeded Go Fish Pictures' profitability target.

On December 28, 2004, DreamWorks Home Entertainment (parent company of theatrical distributor Go Fish Pictures) released Innocence on DVD in the US. Reviews immediately began appearing on Amazon and other websites criticizing the movie's subtitle track: Instead of including the overlay subtitles from the theatrical release, DreamWorks produced the DVD subtitles using closed captioning, resulting in subtitles that intruded on the movie's visual effects. In addition to reading dialogue, audiences saw cues like "[footsteps]" or "[helicopter approaches]". After receiving numerous complaints, DreamWorks released a statement saying that unsatisfied customers could exchange their DVDs for properly subtitled ones, postage paid; and that version 4 already had the proper subtitling.

Bandai Entertainment has released the film on Blu-ray and DVD in the US, with an English dub also featuring the cast used in Ghost in the Shell: Stand Alone Complex. Bandai had licensed the film for a short period from Paramount.

Funimation released the film on DVD and on Blu-ray combo-pack on February 7, 2017. The combo pack features the Japanese version and includes the official English audio track and subtitles, along with the special features.

On April 17, 2024, GKIDS announced the acquisition of the North American distribution rights and announced they would re-release the film theatrically with a new 4K remaster in the summer. This re-release would occur from June 23 to June 27, 2025.

=== United Kingdom ===
Manga Entertainment, which released and co-produced the first film and collaborated with Bandai Entertainment to release the TV series, released Innocence with an English dub featuring the same cast as the one used in Ghost in the Shell: Stand Alone Complex in the UK on February 27, 2006. The Manga UK dub was co-produced with long-time anime partner, Madman Entertainment who has distributed Manga UK titles in Australia since its founding in 1996. The UK English dub on the Region 1 Blu-ray disc features an audio error where the soundtrack has been pitch-shifted down, resulting in unnatural sounding deep voices and mechanical sound effects in slow motion, because the dub was produced to PAL standards rather than NTSC. This is also present on the standard DVD.

=== Australia ===
The controversy with licensing also affected its release in Australia. Although Madman licensed it through Go Fish Pictures, the English dub used is from Manga Entertainment, through which Madman have licensed all Ghost in the Shell properties. The licensing costs are extremely high due to two different licenses being in effect on the DVD release. It is unknown whether Madman will use the Manga Entertainment dub or the Bandai dub for the Blu-ray version.

As part of the film's 20th anniversary, the film received a special 4K re-release through Sugoi Co in cinemas on August 22, 2024.
