= Arie Posin =

American film director

- Born: Early 1970s Israel
- Occupations: Film director, screenwriter
- Years active: 2005–present

Arie Posin is an Israeli-born American film director and screenwriter best known for his 2005 film The Chumscrubber.

== Early life and education ==
Posin was born in Israel in the early 1970s, a month after his anti-communist parents left Russia. His father was a filmmaker and a member of a dissident underground intellectual society. He lived in Israel for the first years of his life before moving to Canada for eight years and ultimately relocating to the United States. Though Posin's father took filmmaking "very, very seriously", Posin was not allowed to watch television when growing because his father believed that "Just like there is good food and there is junk food ... he didn't want us growing up on junk images."

Posin graduated from the University of Southern California (USC) in 1993, which he says was the "epilogue" of film school after growing up with his father as a mentor. While at USC he met filmmaker Billy Wilder, who encouraged Posin to travel, and subsequently lived in Ireland, Israel, France and Spain.

== Career ==
When Posin returned to Los Angeles, California, he began to work at a talent agency where he made connections with agents, writers and producers. He had been writing scripts "trying to break in[to]" the film industry for ten years when he decided that he would rather be a director than a screenwriter. He met writer Zac Stanford, whom he asked to write the screenplay for The Chumscrubber, and the two planned to shoot the film with their own money. Posin's girlfriend suggested that he send the script to five producers; Lawrence Bender was one to respond and passed the script on to his partner Bonnie Curtis. Posin and the producers brought the project to around sixty production companies, each of whom declined, before funds were raised and production began. The Chumscrubber, starring Jamie Bell, Glenn Close and Ralph Fiennes, was filmed in April 2004 with financing from Bob Yari's production company El Camino Pictures. Posin was nominated for the Golden St. George award when the film was screened at the 27th Moscow International Film Festival.

== Filmography ==
- The Chumscrubber (2005) – Director, story
- The Face of Love (2013) – Director, co-writer
- The In Between (2022) – Director
