= The Face of Love (2013 film) =

- Theatrical release poster
- Directed by: Arie Posin
- Written by: Arie Posin; Matthew McDuffie
- Produced by: Bonnie Curtis; Julie Lynn
- Starring: Annette Bening; Ed Harris; Robin Williams; Amy Brenneman; Jess Weixler; Linda Park
- Cinematography: Antonio Riestra
- Edited by: Matt Maddox
- Music by: Marcelo Zarvos
- Production company: Mockingbird Pictures
- Distributed by: IFC Films
- Release dates: September 12, 2013 (TIFF); March 7, 2014 (United States)
- Running time: 92 minutes
- Country: United States
- Language: English
- Budget: $4 million
- Box office: $1.5 million

The Face of Love is a 2013 American romantic drama film directed by Arie Posin and co-written by Matthew McDuffie. The film stars Annette Bening, Ed Harris, Robin Williams, Amy Brenneman, Jess Weixler and Linda Park. It was screened in the Special Presentation section at the 2013 Toronto International Film Festival.

== Plot ==
Nikki is a recent widow whose husband Garret died in a drowning accident; Nikki has not yet gotten over it. Objects, people and situations that remind Nikki of the love of her life still haunt her. Resigned to life alone, Nikki visits an art gallery that she often frequented with Garret and sees a man whose resemblance to her husband stuns her. She returns to the gallery several times, hoping to see him. Eventually, Nikki identifies him as a professor at a small local college. His name is Tom, and she visits him at an art class that he is teaching; but she is emotionally overwhelmed and flees. Eventually, Nikki calms down and invites Tom to tutor her in painting. She does not disclose to him his physical resemblance to her late husband.

Nikki and Tom become lovers, to the emotional distress of her neighbor Roger, who has hoped to romantically attract her interest since the death of Garret, who was his friend. The strain of keeping Tom a secret from her friends and family, who would immediately recognize the uncanny resemblance, begins to wear on Nikki, Tom and the relationship. Nikki is not alone in keeping secrets in the relationship. Tom, who is divorced for ten years from his ex-wife yet still maintains a close friendship with her, does not tell Nikki that he suffers from a severe heart ailment. When Nikki's adult daughter Summer unexpectedly visits, finding Tom at the house, she goes into a rage, repulsed by Tom's appearance. Tom believes that her outrage is triggered simply by his presence. Puzzled by Summer's reaction, he accepts when Nikki asks him to fly to Mexico with her. At a resort often visited by Garret and Nikki when they were married, Tom discovers a photo of Nikki and her husband by the bar, notices the resemblance and also realizes that a psychologically imbalanced Nikki has brought him to the place where her husband died. Tom confronts her with the resemblance, and Nikki runs off into the raging surf, perhaps to die by suicide. She is rescued by Tom, and they hold each other in bed with the knowledge that the relationship is based on nothing more than his physical similarity to Garret and is doomed.

A year later, Summer finds an art gallery card in Nikki's mail; an invitation to a memorial display of Tom's art. Tom has died of his heart condition but produced an outpouring of art in his last year. Nikki attends the reception hosted by Tom's ex-wife and tearfully sees Tom's painting of the two of them titled "The Face of Love". He has painted a haunting self-portrait with Nikki standing in her pool at her home, looking at him.

== Cast ==
- Annette Bening as Nikki
- Ed Harris as Tom/Garrett
- Robin Williams as Roger
- Amy Brenneman as Ann, Tom's ex-wife
- Jess Weixler as Summer
- Linda Park as Jan
- Jeffrey Vincent Parise
- Kim Farris as Hostess
- Leah Shaw as Farmers market shopper
- Chelsea O'Connor as Gallery Waitress
- Deana Molle' as Couple #2
- Yuki Bird as Waitress

== Production ==
=== Filming ===
The film was shot in Los Angeles, California, in 2012, and produced by Mockingbird Pictures.

=== Release ===
In May 2013, IFC Films acquired the rights to distribute the film in the United States. It was released in September 2013.

== Reception ==
On Rotten Tomatoes, The Face of Love has an approval rating of 44%, based on 75 reviews, with a rating of 5.2/10. The site's critical consensus reads: "Perhaps worth checking out if only for the opportunity to see reliably powerful work from Annette Bening and Ed Harris, The Face of Love undermines its leads' performances with a scattershot script and aimless direction." On Metacritic, the film has a score of 51 out of 100, based on 24 critics, indicating "mixed or average" reviews.
