= Shōko Tsuda =

Japanese voice actress

- Born: January 30, 1963 (age 63); Nagasaki, Japan
- Occupations: Actress, voice actress
- Years active: 1987–present

Shōko Tsuda (津田 匠子, Tsuda Shōko; born January 30, 1963) is a Japanese actress and voice actress from Nagasaki Prefecture, Japan affiliated with Ken Production.

== Voice roles ==
=== Anime ===
==== 2002 ====
- The Twelve Kingdoms (Takki)
- Pokémon Advance (Izumi)

==== 2003 ====
- Astro Boy (Chris)
- Gad Guard (Sanada Kyouko)
- Shadow Star Narutaru (President)
- Fullmetal Alchemist (Izumi Curtis)

==== 2004 ====
- Kaiketsu Zorori (Kabankaba, Luca)
- Samurai Champloo (Mother)
- Fafner (Ryouko Kasugai)
- BECK: Mongolian Chop Squad (Koyuki's Mom)

==== 2005 ====
- Kaiketsu Zorori: The Movie
- Ichigo 100% (Manaka's mother)
- Black Cat (Annette Pias)
- Kotenkotenko (God of Lake)
- Paradise Kiss (Yasuko Hayasaka)

==== 2006 ====
- Yomigaeru Sora -RESCUE WINGS- (Yukie Hasegawa)
- Renkin 3-kyuu Magical? Pokahn (Dr. K-Ko)
- Kemonozume (Imekura Girl, Old Granny)
- Silk Road Kids (Barbara)
- Ghost Slayers Ayashi (Sote Matsue)

==== 2007 ====
- Deltora Quest (Zara)
- Nodame Cantabile (Nina Lutz)
- Emma: A Victorian Romance Second Act (Johanna)
- Mokke (Hiyoshi grandmother)
- Pururun! Shizuku-chan Aha (???)

==== 2008 ====
- Shigofumi - Letters from the Departed (Risarra)
- Allison & Lillia (Radia)
- To Love-Ru (Amazon Queen)
- Nabari no Ou (Kourin Shimizu)
- Golgo 13 (Riz)
- Inazuma Eleven (Mother)
- Mōryō no Hako (Kimie Kusumoto)

==== 2009 ====
- Hajime no Ippo: New Challenger (Tomiko)
- Fullmetal Alchemist: Brotherhood (Izumi Curtis)
- Sweet Blue Flowers (Chie Sugimoto)
- Kobato. (Farm Lady)
- Aoi Bungaku Series (Widow)
- Tamagotchi! (???)
- Fairy Tail (Grandine, Porlyusica)

==== 2010 ====
- Nodame Cantabile: Finale (Nina Lutz)
- Black Butler II (Marguerite Turner)

==== 2012 ====
- Kids on the Slope (???)
- Aikatsu! (Miwa Asakura)

==== 2022 ====
- Ganbare! Lulu Lolo - Tiny Twin Bears
- Spy × Family (Martha Marriott)

=== Movies ===
- A Tree of Palme (2002) (???)
- Millennium Actress (2002) (Eiko Shimao)
- Fullmetal Alchemist: The Movie - Conqueror of Shamballa (2005) (Izumi Curtis)
- Mobile Suit Zeta Gundam: A New Translation (2005) (Namikar Cornell)
- Hal (2013) (Mami)

=== Video games ===
==== 2005 ====
- Fullmetal Alchemist: Dream Carnival (Izumi Curtis)
- Romancing SaGa (Eule, Adyllis)

==== 2009 ====
- Kazeiro Surf (Ruidina Ritovaku)
- Fullmetal Alchemist: Daughter of the Dusk (Izumi Curtis)

==== 2010 ====
- Hagane no Renkinjutsushi: Fullmetal Alchemist - Yakusoku no Hi e (Izumi Curtis)

==== 2017 ====
- The Legend of Zelda: Breath of the Wild (Impa)

=== Dubbing ===
- Charmed, The Seer (Debbi Morgan)
