= Division Films =

American film production company

Division Films is a Los Angeles-based film finance and production company established by Wicks Walker in 2012. The company's first film was Spring Breakers starring James Franco, Selena Gomez, Vanessa Hudgens and Ashley Benson. Walker and another producer greenlit the production after Benoît Debie was recruited as cinematographer to work alongside director Harmony Korine and with Selena Gomez added to the cast. Spring Breakers was selected for competition in the 69th Venice Film Festival and released worldwide in 2013.

The company co-produced the two-film project, The Disappearance of Eleanor Rigby, which stars Jessica Chastain, James McAvoy and William Hurt. The film was premiered at the 2013 Toronto International Film Festival, showed in the Cannes Film Festival and was released in 2014 by The Weinstein Company.

Division also produced Last Days in the Desert, which stars Ewan McGregor in the role of Jesus Christ, along with Ayelet Zurer, Ciarán Hinds, and Tye Sheridan. The film was written and directed by Rodrigo García, the son of Nobel Prize winning writer Gabriel García Márquez, and photographed by Emmanuel Lubezki in the California desert. The film premiered at the Sundance Film Festival and was released worldwide in 2016, with USA distribution handled by Broad Green Pictures.

== Films ==
- Last Days in the Desert (2016)
- The Disappearance of Eleanor Rigby (2013)
- Spring Breakers (2012)
