= Cinq à sept =

Activities after work and before returning home

Cinq à sept (French: [sɛ̃k a sɛt], literally 'five to seven') is a French-language term for activities taking place after work and before returning home (sometimes using overtime as an excuse).

It may also be written as 5 à 7 or 5@7.

== In Quebec ==
In Quebec French, the term stands for a social gathering. It may bring together friends or colleagues or may be organized around a specific event, such as a book launch or vernissage. Wine, beer, and cocktails are served along with finger foods and other hors d'oeuvres. Such a party held later may be named for the specific time (for example, six à huit, meaning "six to eight").

A cinq à sept can be a formal gathering held in a wide range of public and private spaces, such as art galleries, university campuses, and places of work, but it is also commonly used more informally as a promotion in bars to attract patrons. The English equivalent might be a semi-formal "wine and cheese" gathering or an informal "happy hour".

== In France ==
Cinq à sept originally referred to a time for a tryst, and consequently is a metonym for a visit to one's mistress, an extramarital affair, and the mistress involved. It derived from the time of day French people would make such a visit. It is still commonly considered as the time of day to meet one's mistress or lover, and the term implies a sexual liaison (as opposed to the Québécois habit).

== Cultural references ==
The phrase was referenced in the 1965 novel La Chamade by French author Françoise Sagan; It was suggested the time has changed to 2 to 4 p.m.

The 2014 US movie 5 to 7, based on the phrase, presents the wife of a diplomat commencing an extramarital affair with a younger writer.

The phrase inspired the title of Agnès Varda's film Cléo from 5 to 7 (1962), which follows a singer awaiting medical results.
