= DreamWorks Pictures =

American film studio

- Logo used since 1995
- Trade name: DreamWorks SKG
- Formerly: DreamWorks LLC (1994–2009); DreamWorks Distribution LLC (1994–2006); DW Studios, LLC (2009–2015); DreamWorks II Distribution Co., LLC (2011–2015)
- Type: Subsidiary
- Industry: Film
- Founded: October 12, 1994; 32 years ago
- Founders: Steven Spielberg; Jeffrey Katzenberg; David Geffen
- Headquarters: 100 Universal City Plaza, Universal City, California, U.S.
- Key people: Steven Spielberg (chairman); Jeff Small (CEO); Holly Bario (president of production)
- Products: Motion pictures
- Number of employees: 80 (2012)
- Parent: Paramount Pictures (2006–2008); Amblin Partners (2015–present) (Note: Via a joint venture between Reliance Entertainment, Lionsgate Studios, Damai Entertainment, and Universal Pictures.)
- Divisions: DreamWorks Television (1994–2013); DreamWorks Animation (1994–2004); DreamWorks Home Entertainment (1998–2009); DreamWorks Interactive (50%) (1995–2000); DreamWorks Records (1996–2005); Go Fish Pictures (2000–2007)
- Subsidiaries: Pacific Data Images (2000–2004); GameWorks (50%; 1996–2001)
- Website: amblin.com/movie/dreamworks/

DreamWorks Pictures (DWP, also known as DreamWorks SKG or simply DreamWorks) is an American film studio and distribution label of Amblin Partners. The company was originally founded on October 12, 1994, as a live-action and animation film studio by Steven Spielberg, Jeffrey Katzenberg, and David Geffen (which together form the SKG of DreamWorks SKG), at which time they owned 72%. From 1997 to 2005, DreamWorks distributed its own films and its third-party films, with Universal Pictures handling worldwide home video distribution during that period. It has released, produced, and/or distributed more than ten films with box-office grosses of more than $100 million each.

DreamWorks Pictures was sold to Viacom, parent of Paramount Pictures in 2006 (this version is now named DW Studios, LLC). In 2008, the principals behind DreamWorks made a deal to create a new film studio with Reliance Anil Dhirubhai Ambani Group, re-creating DreamWorks Pictures as an independent entity. The following year, DreamWorks entered into a distribution agreement with Walt Disney Studios Motion Pictures, wherein Disney would distribute DreamWorks films through the Touchstone Pictures label; the deal continued until August 2016. In 2015, DreamWorks was relaunched as Amblin Partners. Since October 2016, Universal Pictures has distributed most of the films produced by DreamWorks Pictures. Currently, DreamWorks operates out of offices on the Universal Studios Lot.

DreamWorks is separate and distinct from DreamWorks Animation (DWA), its former animation studio. Following the critical success of Shrek (2001), which won the inaugural Academy Award for Best Animated Feature at the 74th Academy Awards ceremony, the animation division was spun off into its own separate company in 2004 and later acquired by Comcast (through NBCUniversal) in 2016. DWP continues to use the original DreamWorks trademarks under license from DWA.

== History ==
=== Founding and Universal distribution (1994–2005) ===
The original company was founded following Jeffrey Katzenberg's resignation from The Walt Disney Company in 1994. Katzenberg approached director Steven Spielberg and music executive David Geffen about forming a live-action and animation film studio, which had not been done in decades due to the risk and expense, but all three were very successful. They agreed on three conditions: They would make fewer than nine movies a year, they would be free to work for other studios if they chose, and they would go home in time for dinner. They officially founded DreamWorks SKG on October 12, 1994, with financial backing of $33 million from each of the three partners plus $500 million from Microsoft co-founder Paul Allen, and $300 million from CJ Group heiress Miky Lee, giving the CJ Group an 11% stake in DreamWorks; the deal was also initially understood to include distribution rights to DreamWorks films across Asia excluding Japan, although CJ ultimately handled rights for only China, South Korea and Hong Kong, with all other international territories handled by United International Pictures (UIP). Their new studio was based at offices on the Universal Studios Lot, in the same bungalow as Amblin Entertainment. Despite access to sound stages and sets, DreamWorks preferred to film motion pictures on location. Usually, however, the company would film in a soundstage or set in a major studio. Shortly after DreamWorks was founded, the media dubbed Spielberg, Katzenberg and Geffen as "the three amigos". Despite Geffen's initial investment, it was reported in October 1994 that DreamWorks would only produce live-action and animated films, television programs and interactive entertainment. There were rumors that Warner Bros. Records CEO Mo Ostin might collaborate at DreamWorks with Geffen, who himself was still contracted to work at Geffen Records. The company eventually expanded into music once Geffen stepped down from Geffen Records in April 1995, and Ostin would be hired as leader of DreamWorks' music operations that October. By 1998, DreamWorks was labelled as "multifaceted entertainment", with the company describing its ambition in 1997 as being to nurture creative breakthroughs in "every field" of entertainment.

In December 1994, DreamWorks Television was formed after DreamWorks agreed to a $200 million seven-year television production joint venture with Capital Cities/ABC. The company was set up to produce series for broadcast networks, cable channels and first run syndication, with no first-look guarantee for ABC, but financial incentives favored the network. Their first show, Champions, was scheduled as a mid-season replacement for ABC. Dan McDermott was named the division's chief executive in June 1995. DreamWorks Television's first success was Spin City on ABC, the parent company of which was bought by The Walt Disney Company in February 1996. In 2002, the DreamWorks joint venture agreement with ABC ended. That agreement was replaced by a development agreement with NBC, with a first look clause. In September 2013, DreamWorks Television merged with Amblin Television.

In 1995, traditional animation artists from Amblimation joined the new studio, which led to DreamWorks buying part of Pacific Data Images (PDI), a company specializing in visual effects, and renaming it PDI/DreamWorks in 2000. Both were software divisions and would merge later on. By then, DreamWorks had the traditional animators working for their animation department, and the computer animators worked on CG films. Amblimation shut down in 1997 and all 250 of Amblimation's crew members went on to join DreamWorks Animation. The same year, DreamWorks Interactive, a computer and video game developer and joint venture between DreamWorks and Microsoft, was founded. DreamWorks Interactive was intended to eventually form synergies with the animation, film and television divisions of DreamWorks, with Geffen speculating in April 1995 that it could also possibly form synergies with DreamWorks' upcoming music division. With DreamWorks losing interest in maintaining a video game division, Electronic Arts (EA) acquired the Los Angeles studio of DreamWorks Interactive from DreamWorks and Microsoft on February 24, 2000, acquiring the intellectual property and rights of the acclaimed series Medal of Honor from Microsoft/DreamWorks.

In June 1995, DreamWorks announced that it had signed a $1 billion deal with MCA Inc. (then parent company of Universal Pictures) to distribute its theatrical releases in other countries and its home video releases worldwide over 10 years. MCA also bought a 2% stake in the company for $54 million.

In 1996, the company's record label, DreamWorks Records, was founded, the first project of which was George Michael's album Older. The first band signed to the label was eels, who released their debut album Beautiful Freak that year. DreamWorks Records went on to sign established artists for their label, including the alternative rock act Morphine, comedian Chris Rock (as a spoken word artist) and Henry Rollins (as both a spoken word artist and a member of Rollins Band). The label helped launch the careers of artists such as Alien Ant Farm, Elliott Smith, Nelly Furtado and Papa Roach. Once the main film division officially commenced in 1997, the label started releasing numerous soundtrack compilation albums for live-action and animated DreamWorks films, including American Beauty, Road Trip, Shrek, Small Soldiers and The Prince of Egypt, among others. These albums mostly consisted of songs from artists signed to DreamWorks Records, with the films themselves also using songs from DreamWorks artists; an example being American Beauty, which had eels' song "Cancer for the Cure" and Elliot Smith's song "Because" in both the soundtrack album and the film. The label's most commercially successful release was Papa Roach's Infest, which sold 7 million units on the back of the rap rock movement, while some of the label's highest-charting songs included Nelly Furtado's "I'm Like a Bird" and Alien Ant Farm's cover of Michael Jackson's "Smooth Criminal". Commercially, the record company as a whole never lived up to expectations, and was sold in November 2003 to Universal Music Group, who closed it at the beginning of 2005. Until September 1, 2005, UMG continued to operate DreamWorks Nashville, a country-focused division of DreamWorks Records which was founded in June 1997. That label was shut down when its flagship artist, Toby Keith, departed to form his own label.

In 1997, DreamWorks released its first three live-action movies; The Peacemaker, the studio's first adult-oriented film; Amistad, Spielberg's first film for the studio; and Mouse Hunt. All three of those films were relatively successful, managing to outgross their budgets by moderate margins, with Mouse Hunt being the most profitable of the three. Amistad's score was composed by John Williams, a frequent Spielberg collaborator

In 1998, the United States 9th Circuit Court of Appeals upheld a lawsuit against DreamWorks for trademark infringement by Dreamwerks Production Group, Inc., a company mostly specializing in Star Trek conventions. That same year, DreamWorks released its first-ever two animated movies, Antz and The Prince of Egypt, both of which are produced by DreamWorks Pictures and DreamWorks Animation distributed by DreamWorks Distribution. DreamWorks Distribution continued distributing all DreamWorks Animation films until Wallace & Gromit: The Curse of the Were-Rabbit. DreamWorks Animation films were generally targeted towards younger audiences, in contrast to the more adult-oriented live-action DreamWorks Pictures films, including films with strong sexual elements such as American Beauty, Road Trip, and EuroTrip, which shared the same branding through to 2004. DreamWorks also had another division called DreamWorks Television Animation, which in 1998 produced Toonsylvania and Invasion America. However, it quickly folded and the later animated show Alienators: Evolution Continues (based on the 2001 live-action DreamWorks film Evolution) was instead handled by the main DreamWorks Television division, in association with DIC Entertainment and other parties. Michael Jackson's brother Jermaine Jackson subsequently claimed in 2003 that DreamWorks' icon of a boy fishing and sitting on a moon crescent was plagiarized from the entrance to Jackson's Neverland Ranch. Spielberg was a friend of Jackson during the 1980s and appeared in his "Liberian Girl" music video. This was among the only animated content that Paramount Pictures acquired from DreamWorks when its parent company Viacom purchased the live-action film division and television division in 2006.

At the 71st Academy Awards in March 1999, DreamWorks Pictures's live-action film Saving Private Ryan was the overwhelming frontrunner for the Best Picture Oscar. Directed by company co-founder Steven Spielberg, the film had received critical praise for its authentic portrayal of World War II, and was a commercial success. However, in one of the most famous upsets in Academy history, the award was instead given to romantic comedy Shakespeare in Love, from Disney-owned Miramax, a studio which won numerous other Oscars in the 1990s and 2000s. The loss is widely attributed to an aggressive and unprecedented awards campaign by Miramax and its head, Harvey Weinstein. It included a reported "whisper campaign" to downplay the merits of Saving Private Ryan. Ironically, Shakespeare in Love and Saving Private Ryan both ended up becoming part of the same corporate umbrella via Paramount Pictures' acquisition of the live-action DreamWorks film library in 2006, and its acquisition of the Miramax library in 2020.

Following its defeat to Miramax, DreamWorks won three consecutive Academy Awards for Best Picture between 2000 and 2002, for American Beauty, Gladiator and Beautiful Mind (the latter two were co-productions with Universal Pictures). By this point, DreamWorks were considered to be the first new major Hollywood motion picture studio since RKO Pictures was founded in 1928. Go Fish Pictures, a division of DreamWorks with the objective to distribute art-house, independent and foreign films, was founded in 2000. The division experienced success with the anime films Millennium Actress (2003) and Ghost in the Shell 2: Innocence (2004), respectively, which led them to venture into releasing live-action films, with the release of The Chumscrubber. However, The Chumscrubber was a commercial and critical failure, which led DreamWorks to shut down the division in 2007 shortly before the release of the Japanese film Casshern (which was distributed by DreamWorks). The library of Go Fish Pictures was included when Paramount Pictures acquired DreamWorks' live-action film library in 2006, even though it mainly consisted of the American distribution rights to the aforementioned anime titles.

In 2000, DreamWorks was planning on building a studio backlot after buying 1,087 acres of land in the Playa Vista area in Los Angeles. It was to be complete with 18 sound stages, with many office buildings and a lake. There would also be new homes, schools, churches, and museums. The project was to be completed in 2001, but was canceled for financial reasons. In April 2001, DreamWorks and Universal Pictures (through its new parent company Vivendi Universal) announced that they had extended their distribution agreement for an additional five years, following the commercial successes of Gladiator and Meet the Parents the year prior, both of which were co-produced by DreamWorks and Universal. In January 2002, DreamWorks signed a deal with In Demand.

For the period beginning October 1, 2004, to January 31, 2006, DreamWorks Pictures distributed its films in the North American domestic theatrical and worldwide television market, with international theatrical and worldwide home entertainment distribution by Universal Pictures. On October 27, 2004, DreamWorks Animation was spun off into a separate public company.

David Geffen admitted that DreamWorks came close to bankruptcy twice. Under Katzenberg's watch, the studio suffered a $125 million loss on the 2003 animated film Sinbad: Legend of the Seven Seas, and also overestimated the DVD demand for Shrek 2, with 5 million unsold DVDs. In 2005, out of their two large budget pictures, War of the Worlds was produced as a joint effort with Paramount Pictures which was the first to reap a significant amount of profits, while The Island bombed at the domestic box office, but turned a profit internationally through Warner Bros. Pictures.

The 2003 Bo Welch film, The Cat In The Hat also released in this period and was a critical and commercial failure.

=== Paramount ownership (2005–2008) ===
In December 2005, it was announced the original Viacom, the then-parent of Paramount Pictures, agreed to purchase the live-action studio, still keeping the original name and producing/distribution name. The deal was valued at approximately $1.6 billion, an amount that included about $400 million in debt assumptions. Throughout most of 2005, DreamWorks Pictures was widely expected to be acquired by newly formed NBC Universal, parent of Universal Pictures and majority owned by General Electric (GE) (with the remainder owned by Vivendi as a result of GE's acquisition of a majority stake in that company's Vivendi Universal division which included Universal Pictures and related assets and merger of it with their NBC division to form NBC Universal). The transaction was viewed by industry analysts as a natural fit due to Spielberg's decades-long history with Universal Pictures and the fact that DreamWorks had utilized the Universal Studios lot for its headquarters and international distribution since its founding. Negotiations between DreamWorks and NBC Universal lasted for approximately nine months, with exclusive talks beginning in July 2005. By September 2005, the two parties had reportedly reached a verbal agreement for a sale valued at roughly $1.5 billion to $1.6 billion. However, towards the end of negotiations that month, GE attempted to lower their offer by approximately $100 million, and this last minute reduction angered Geffen. Another issue was that GE would effectively reduce DreamWorks Pictures to being a production label of Universal Pictures rather than a standalone company within NBC Universal. This was an unacceptable condition for Spielberg, who was far less involved with the negotiations than Geffen was. In late September 2005, it was speculated that talks between DreamWorks and NBC Universal might eventually resume at a later point. As the talks stalled, Viacom unexpectedly entered the bidding. Led by Paramount's new Chairman Brad Grey, they moved aggressively to propose their own offer in early December 2005. DreamWorks accepted Viacom's offer on December 9, 2005, with the deal being announced to the media two days later. In a public statement from December 2005, Spielberg said, "due to my very long history and my loyalty to Universal, I was saddened that after long negotiations and many compromises, we were unable to come to terms with Universal's parent company, GE." Regarding NBC Universal/GE, Geffen said in December 2005, "I think they thought we had no choice, and were going to squeeze us and squeeze us. After a year of dealing with them, they still did not have a concluded, finished contract ready to sign."

The acquisition of the live-action DreamWorks studio was completed by the second iteration of Viacom, which had recently split from the original at the end of 2005, on February 1, 2006. DreamWorks Pictures would briefly become a semi-autonomous label of Paramount Pictures. A key reason for Viacom's acquisition was due to a severe shortage in Paramount's own film production pipeline for 2006–2007, after Grey's new regime canceled many pre-existing projects. Spielberg and Geffen were still involved with the company under Paramount, although Geffen eventually departed in 2008 since he was interested in reinventing himself as a newspaper mogul. Katzenberg was now working at the newly independent DreamWorks Animation, and remained there until its sale to NBCUniversal in 2016, which left Spielberg as the only one of the three founders currently involved with either DreamWorks company. Viacom's 2006 purchase of DreamWorks Pictures included a separate deal for Paramount to distribute new films by DreamWorks Animation over a six-year period. Viacom also held the rights to co-produce television shows based on DreamWorks Animation characters, via their children's division Nickelodeon.

Starting in September 2006, DreamWorks Pictures and Paramount Pictures went on to co-release films such as Blades of Glory, Disturbia, Dreamgirls, The Last Kiss, Tropic Thunder and the 2007 live-action adaptation of Transformers. Despite internal tensions between DreamWorks and Paramount, the partnership led to Paramount becoming the highest grossing US studio of 2007. A point of contention was that Viacom owner Sumner Redstone viewed DreamWorks purely as a label of Paramount Pictures, whereas Spielberg did not view it as such, even resisting having new DreamWorks films being branded as Paramount films. In most of the Paramount-distributed DreamWorks films from this period, Paramount's logo only briefly appears at the very end of the credits, with the films usually opening with DreamWorks' 1997 logo. Notable exceptions are Dreamgirls and Transformers, which feature both the Paramount logo and the DreamWorks logo at the beginning. It was Spielberg who insisted, as part of the 2006 sale, that Paramount's logo appear on DreamWorks' movies after the credits to give DreamWorks' own banner top billing. In a 2007 Los Angeles Times article, an anonymous source said that Spielberg wanted to "carry the torch that DreamWorks should feel like its own studio." In 2007, Redstone said, "I understand how people like them, entrepreneurs who built companies and are creative geniuses, want a hell of a lot of autonomy. They're entitled to a lot of autonomy and [we] are committed to giving them that. We do not treat them as employees, we treat them as co-workers."

One of the biggest clashes between DreamWorks and Viacom/Paramount was over perceived ownership for the acclaimed Dreamgirls, which won several awards, and which was a pet project that Geffen had been trying to get made for the last 25 years. This film was shot between January and March 2006, and produced by DreamWorks with funding from Warner Bros. and Paramount. Warner Bros. dropped out of the project at the last minute following Viacom's purchase of DreamWorks, and Paramount subsequently became sole owner of the film. In the lead up to the awards season, a DreamWorks executive sent an email to top Paramount managers, including Brad Grey, stating that the Dreamgirls filmmakers had requested there be no speeches before the film's premieres in New York and Los Angeles. However, at both events in early December 2006, Grey proceeded to give a speech honoring the filmmakers and acknowledging Geffen's 25-year effort to bring the project to the screen. According to anonymous DreamWorks insiders, who spoke to the media on anonymity out of fear of reprisal, Grey's actions were seen as a deliberate affront. Conversely, Paramount executives maintained that Grey, as the chairman of the studio owning the film, was well within his rights.

On March 17, 2006, Viacom agreed to sell a controlling interest in the 1997–2005 DreamWorks Pictures live-action library to Soros Strategic Partners and Dune Entertainment II. Viacom held a minority 49% stake, while the other parties, led by billionaire George Soros, held a majority 51% stake. The film library (consisting of 59 titles) was valued at $900 million, and selling the majority stake helped Viacom finance the acquisition of the live-action studio itself. Paramount Pictures retained the worldwide distribution rights to those films, as well as various ancillary rights, including music publishing (the music publishing rights were later licensed to Sony/ATV Music Publishing when the company acquired Viacom's Famous Music subdivision), sequels and merchandising. The sale was completed on May 8, 2006. On February 8, 2010, Viacom repurchased Soros' controlling stake in the DreamWorks Pictures library for around $400 million. Several notable DreamWorks films such as Cast Away (which DreamWorks controlled international rights) and American Beauty were not released on Blu-ray by Paramount Home Entertainment until they bought back Soros' controlling stake. However, they reissued certain other live-action DreamWorks films from 1997 to 2005 prior to buying back the stake.

With only a few exceptions, Paramount Pictures continues to control the rights to all films and television shows DreamWorks produced during their partnership, in addition to controlling the live-action film and television titles DreamWorks released prior to 2006. Paramount have also retained the film rights to the Hasbro-owned Transformers franchise, going on to release further films without DreamWorks' involvement. Initially, DreamWorks films released on home video were still branded similar to DreamWorks Home Entertainment releases and did not feature Paramount's logo on the packaging. Later home video releases have since incorporated Paramount's branding, including pre-2006 titles which Paramount had no involvement with. They do not hold the rights to the DreamWorks Animation films released prior to 2006, although they temporarily controlled the home media rights to the pre-2006 DreamWorks Animation library.

=== Reliance-Spielberg joint venture and Disney distribution (2008–2015) ===
In June 2008, it was reported that the principals behind DreamWorks Pictures were looking for financing that would allow it to continue operations, but as an independent production company separate from Paramount. Several public equity funds were approached for financing, including Blackstone Group, Fuse Global, TPG Capital and several others, but all passed on the deal given their understanding of the Hollywood markets. On September 22, 2008, it was announced that the DreamWorks principals closed a deal with Indian investment firm Reliance Anil Dhirubhai Ambani Group to create a new $1.2 billion stand-alone production company and end its ties with Paramount. In January 2009, Spielberg entered a licensing agreement with DreamWorks Animation to use the DreamWorks trademarks, logo, and name for film productions and releases.

As part of the 2008 separation agreement with Paramount/Viacom, they retained an option to co-finance and co-distribute 15–20 upcoming DreamWorks Pictures projects. As a result of this deal, Paramount Pictures currently own the rights to most live-action DreamWorks films that were released between 1997 and 2010.

On February 9, 2009, DreamWorks Pictures entered into a long-term, 30-picture distribution deal with Walt Disney Studios Motion Pictures, by which DreamWorks' films would be released through the Touchstone Pictures banner, with Disney collecting a 10% distribution fee. Despite signing the deal in early 2009, DreamWorks Pictures only started releasing films through Disney/Touchstone in 2011. The deal also included co-funding via a $175 million loan by Walt Disney Studios to DreamWorks for production and access to slots in Disney's pay television agreement, then with Starz. The agreement was reported to have come after negotiations broke off with Universal Pictures just days earlier. DreamWorks raised $325 million from Reliance Entertainment and an additional $325 million in debt in 2009. On August 18, 2009, DreamWorks and Reliance signed a three-year, $825 million pact for up to six films a year.

DreamWorks' slate of films in 2011, I Am Number Four, Cowboys & Aliens, and Fright Night failed, while The Help, Real Steel and Spielberg's War Horse had success at the box office. This left DreamWorks so financially drained that by 2011, DreamWorks was seeking additional funding from Reliance. Reliance gave a $200 million investment on April 10, 2012. Under the deal, DreamWorks Pictures scaled back production to three films per year and sought co-financiers on big budget films, such as 20th Century Fox, which would later that year enter a five-year distribution deal with DreamWorks Animation, would co-finance and handle international distribution for Lincoln and Bridge of Spies. DreamWorks continued to have Disney distribute and market their films. On August 29, 2012, after renegotiating their agreement with Disney, DreamWorks formed a deal with Mister Smith Entertainment to distribute its films internationally excluding India (where Reliance Entertainment will distribute), while Disney would continue to distribute in North America, Latin America, Australia, New Zealand, Russia and some territories in Asia.

=== Amblin Partners venture and return to Universal (2016–present) ===
On September 2, 2015, it was reported that DreamWorks and Disney would not renew their distribution deal, which was set to expire in August 2016, with The Light Between Oceans being released in September as the final DreamWorks film distributed by Disney under their original distribution agreement. During that time, DreamWorks was in early negotiations with Universal Pictures to distribute its upcoming films. The contract allowing Spielberg to license the DreamWorks trademarks, name and logo from Jeffrey Katzenberg's DreamWorks Animation was set to expire on January 1, 2016, leading to media speculation that Spielberg would not renew the pact. Disney retained the film rights to the fourteen DreamWorks films it released, under subsidiary DreamWorks II Distribution Co. LLC from DreamWorks and Reliance on December 11, 2015.

On December 16, 2015, Spielberg, Reliance, Entertainment One and Participant Media partnered to launch the content production company Amblin Partners, which would use DreamWorks as a brand for adult-themed films produced under the new company. In addition to DreamWorks, the new company also would produce films under the Amblin Entertainment and Participant banners. On the same day, Amblin Partners announced a five-year distribution deal with Universal, under which the company's films would be distributed and marketed by either the main Universal label or its specialty label, Focus Features. 2016's The Girl on the Train was the first film released under the new agreement, though a few films, like Office Christmas Party (2016), Ghost in the Shell (2017) and The Post (2017), were released by Paramount Pictures and 20th Century Fox respectively. Office Christmas Party and Ghost in the Shell were DreamWorks Pictures' first projects to have been done with Paramount since the 2008 split and DreamWorks' subsequent distribution relationship with Touchstone. Earlier in 2012, while the DreamWorks/Touchstone deal was in effect, a DreamWorks/Paramount film titled A Thousand Words was released, although this film originally began shooting in August 2008, while DreamWorks was still owned by Viacom. It had been delayed due to complications arising from the DreamWorks/Viacom split.

On February 15, 2017, Universal acquired a minority stake in Amblin Partners, which reunited a minority percentage of the live-action DreamWorks label with its former DreamWorks Animation division, which Universal acquired the year prior in 2016 and eventually handled distribution that began with How to Train Your Dragon: The Hidden World in 2019, after DreamWorks Animation's distribution deal with 20th Century Fox expired with the release of Captain Underpants: The First Epic Movie in 2017. In 2020, Netflix released the film The Trial of the Chicago 7, which was a co-production between DreamWorks Pictures, Paramount Pictures and several other parties. This was one of the 15–20 DreamWorks projects that Paramount originally considered co-financing/co-distributing in late 2008–2010, as part of the post-split deal they made with DreamWorks Pictures. The project would end up being delayed, and shooting did not begin until 2019.

In 2021, Paramount launched their subscription streaming service Paramount+, which includes the 1997–2010 DreamWorks Pictures films owned by Paramount Pictures. Additionally, Paramount included these films on their free streaming service Pluto TV, which also includes certain DreamWorks Television shows owned by Paramount. Disney's subscription streaming service Disney+ launched in 2019, and has included the 2011–2016 DreamWorks Pictures films owned by Touchstone. However, this was mainly in international markets where their more adult-focused streaming service Hulu was unavailable, with Hulu including most of the Touchstone-owned DreamWorks films.

== Logo ==
=== Original ===
The original DreamWorks logo features a boy sitting on a crescent moon with a fishing rod at night. The general idea for the logo was the idea of the company's founder, Steven Spielberg, who wanted a CGI image. Illustrator Robert Hunt was commissioned to execute the idea as a painting, and he used his son as the model. The logo was then turned into a motion graphic at Industrial Light & Magic, in collaboration with Kaleidoscope Films, Dave Carson and Clint Goldman. It was animated by ILM animation supervisor Wes Takahashi. It is composed by John Williams.

=== Animation ===
The reimagined animation logo had music adapted from the track "Fairytale" for Shrek, based on the children's picture book of the same name by author William Steig. The logo was composed by Harry Gregson-Williams and made its debut in 2004, with the release of Shrek 2, a film which Gregson-Williams also composed. Two years after its acquisition by NBCUniversal in 2016, the logo received a new fanfare composed by John Powell and incorporate some cues from Shrek 2 and tones from Williams' original DreamWorks fanfare to create the music for the logo. The new fanfare debuted in 2019, with the release of How to Train Your Dragon: The Hidden World, a film for which Powell also composed. In 2022, Harry Gregson-Williams returned to compose a new version of the fanfare, with the debut of Puss in Boots: The Last Wish.

== DreamWorks Home Entertainment ==
DreamWorks Home Entertainment
- Logo used from 1998 to 2009
- Type: Division
- Industry: Home video
- Predecessor: CIC Video (1998–1999)
- Founded: March 10, 1998; 28 years ago
- Defunct: 2009; 17 years ago
- Fate: Folded into Paramount Home Entertainment
- Successor: Paramount Home Entertainment (2009–present, DWS catalog); DreamWorks Animation Home Entertainment (2006–2018, DWA catalog)
- Headquarters: Universal City, California, United States
- Area served: Worldwide
- Products: Home video
- Number of employees: 80 (2012)
- Parent: DreamWorks Pictures

DreamWorks Home Entertainment (DWHE) was an American home video unit of DreamWorks Pictures and label for other home video units founded on March 10, 1998. Its releases were first distributed by Universal Pictures Home Entertainment (and initially internationally through CIC Video), in 2006, after DreamWorks Pictures was acquired by Viacom and Paramount Pictures, DreamWorks Home Entertainment became a sub-label of Paramount Home Entertainment used for live-action films released under the live-action DreamWorks label until it was folded into Paramount Home Entertainment in 2009 when DreamWorks Pictures spun-off itself from Paramount Pictures and became an independent company.

The majority of the 1997-present DreamWorks Pictures film library is currently owned and distributed by multiple companies, the majority of the 1997-2011 DreamWorks Pictures film library is owned by Paramount Home Entertainment, (Note: Majority-owned by National Amusements from 2009–2025 and by Paramount Skydance Corporation from 2025–present.) the majority of the 2011-2016 DreamWorks Pictures film library is owned by Walt Disney Studios Home Entertainment, (Note: Released under the Touchstone Home Entertainment label.) and the majority of the 2016-present DreamWorks Pictures film library is owned by Universal Pictures Home Entertainment.

== Filmography ==
=== Film series ===
Title	Release date	No. Films	Notes
Meet the Parents	2000–present	4	co-production with Universal Pictures (2000, 2004, 2010, 2026) and Paramount Pictures (2010, 2026)
Road Trip	2000–2009	3	co-production with The Montecito Picture Company (2000, 2004) and Paramount Famous Productions (2009)
Shrek	2001–2004	2	co-production with DreamWorks Animation and Pacific Data Images
The Ring	2002–2005	2	co-production with Vertigo Entertainment
Transformers	2007–2009	2	co-production with Paramount Pictures and Hasbro

=== Highest-grossing films ===
Highest-grossing films in North America
Rank	Title	Year	Gross
1	Shrek 2	2004	$444,978,202
2	Transformers: Revenge of the Fallen	2009	$402,111,870
3	Transformers: Dark of the Moon	2011	$352,390,543
4	Transformers	2007	$319,246,193
5	Meet the Fockers	2004	$279,261,160
6	Shrek	2001	$270,491,111
7	War of the Worlds	2005	$234,280,354
8	Cast Away	2000	$233,632,142
9	Saving Private Ryan	1998	$216,540,909
10	Madagascar	2005	$193,595,521
11	Gladiator	2000	$187,705,427
12	Lincoln	2012	$182,207,973
13	A Beautiful Mind	2001	$170,742,341
14	The Help	2011	$169,708,112
15	Meet the Parents	2000	$166,244,045
16	Catch Me If You Can	2002	$164,606,800
17	Shark Tale	2004	$161,412,000
18	1917	2019	$159,227,644
19	What Lies Beneath	2000	$155,464,351
20	Deep Impact	1998	$140,464,664
21	Minority Report	2002	$132,072,926
22	American Beauty	1999	$130,058,047
23	The Ring	2002	$129,094,024
24	Seabiscuit	2003	$120,277,854
25	Lemony Snicket's A Series of Unfortunate Events	2004	$118,634,549

Highest-grossing films worldwide
Rank	Title	Year	Gross
1	Transformers: Dark of the Moon	2011	$1,123,794,079
2	Shrek 2	2004	$932,542,741
3	Transformers: Revenge of the Fallen	2009	$836,519,699
4	Transformers	2007	$709,709,780
5	War of the Worlds	2005	$603,873,119
6	Madagascar	2005	$542,063,846
7	Meet the Fockers	2004	$522,657,936
8	Shrek	2001	$489,732,595
9	Saving Private Ryan	1998	$482,352,390
10	Gladiator	2000	$465,390,350
11	1917	2019	$446,064,352
12	Cast Away	2000	$427,632,142
13	Shark Tale	2004	$374,583,879
14	Minority Report	2002	$358,372,926
15	American Beauty	1999	$356,258,047
16	Catch Me If You Can	2002	$355,612,291
17	Deep Impact	1998	$349,464,664
18	Meet the Parents	2000	$330,443,045
19	Green Book	2018	$321,752,485
20	A Beautiful Mind	2001	$317,668,058
21	Real Steel	2011	$299,268,508
22	What Lies Beneath	2000	$291,420,351
23	Lincoln	2012	$275,293,450
24	The Ring	2002	$249,348,933
25	A.I. Artificial Intelligence	2001	$235,926,552

=== Primary owners and distributors ===
==== Theatrical distributors ====
- Universal Pictures
  (1997–2005 for DW Studios, LLC and DreamWorks Animation catalogs; 2016–present for Storyteller Distribution Co., LLC catalog; 2019–present for DreamWorks Animation catalog)
- Paramount Pictures
  (2006–2012 for DW Studios, LLC and DreamWorks Animation catalogs)
- Walt Disney Studios Motion Pictures (Note: Released under the Touchstone Pictures label.)
  (2011–2016 for DreamWorks II Distribution Co., LLC catalog)
- 20th Century Fox
  (2013–2017 for DreamWorks Animation catalog)

==== Home entertainment distributors ====
- Universal Pictures Home Entertainment
  (1998–2006 for DW Studios, LLC and DreamWorks Animation catalogs; 2016–present for Storyteller Distribution Co., LLC catalog; 2018–present for DreamWorks Animation catalog)
- Paramount Home Entertainment
  (2009–present for DW Studios, LLC catalog; 2006–2013 for DreamWorks Animation catalog)
- Walt Disney Studios Home Entertainment
  (2011–present for DreamWorks II Distribution Co., LLC catalog)
- 20th Century Fox Home Entertainment
  (2013–2017 for DreamWorks Animation catalog)
- Sony Pictures Home Entertainment
  (briefly in 2024 for DreamWorks II Distribution Co., LLC catalog through Walt Disney Studios Home Entertainment)
- Studio Distribution Services
  (2021–2026 for Storyteller Distribution Co., LLC and DreamWorks Animation catalogs via UPHE pre-SDS merger; 2024–2026 for DreamWorks II Distribution Co., LLC catalog via SPHE/WDSHE)

== See also ==
- The Geffen Company
- Amblin Entertainment
- Amblin Documentaries
- DreamWorks Animation
