= Last Days in the Desert =

- Theatrical release poster
- Directed by: Rodrigo García
- Written by: Rodrigo García
- Based on: Gospels of Mark, Luke and Matthew
- Produced by: Bonnie Curtis; Julie Lynn; Wicks Walker
- Starring: Ewan McGregor; Tye Sheridan; Ciarán Hinds; Ayelet Zurer
- Cinematography: Emmanuel Lubezki
- Edited by: Matt Maddox
- Music by: Danny Bensi; Saunder Jurriaans
- Production companies: Division Films; Mockingbird Pictures; Ironwood Entertainment; Aspiration Media; American Zoetrope
- Distributed by: Broad Green Pictures
- Release dates: January 25, 2015 (Sundance); May 13, 2016 (United States)
- Running time: 98 minutes
- Country: United States
- Language: English

Last Days in the Desert is a 2015 American drama film written and directed by Rodrigo García. A variation on the biblical story of the Temptation of Christ, the film stars Ewan McGregor in a dual role of Jesus (referred to in the film as "Yeshua") and a demon who may or may not be Satan, while Tye Sheridan, Ciarán Hinds, and Ayelet Zurer play a family they meet while in the desert.

Last Days in the Desert premiered at the 2015 Sundance Film Festival on January 25, 2015 and was released in the United States on May 13, 2016.

== Plot ==
Seeking information of his purpose on Earth, holy man Yeshua retreats to the desert to pray to his heavenly father, but finds himself unable to communicate with him, while he is frequently taunted by a demon who assumes Yeshua's appearance. He encounters an old woman to whom he gives water, before noticing she has a lizard-like tail, and she laughs at him.

Yeshua meets a boy who lives in the desert with his father and his dying mother, who he is helping build a house for them to live in. The mother is unable to eat and the father offers her food to Yeshua but he declines, saying he is fasting. Yeshua continues on his way but returns to help them build the house and stays with them in their tent. Yeshua starts experiencing disturbing dreams and the demon poses as the mother, wanting Yeshua to believe that the boy is product of an infidelity. The demon reveals to Yeshua that he can see the future, but whenever he intervenes he cannot predict the outcome, and his frustration to understand his father's plan, as he keeps restarting the universe only with little differences. Yeshua asks the demon what it is like to be in his father's presence, the demon explains an abstract feeling, and that there is no face.

The boy tells Yeshua of his conflict between appeasing his father and his desire to leave the desert and see Jerusalem and other large cities. When the father discovers a potentially lucrative vein of jasper in a cliff, he plans to extract it by lowering the boy down into the chasm it is situated, but the boy refuses to do so. Enraged, the father descends into the chasm himself. Yeshua and the boy hold the rope the father lowers himself with but it breaks they try to save the father, who instead lets go and he falls into the chasm. Yeshua and the boy go to look for him, but when they find him he dies from his injuries.

Yeshua returns with the body so the mother can see her husband one last time, they then find the body burned and the boy takes some of his father's ashes. His mother tells him to leave her rather than see her die. Yeshua demands that the demon show him the boy's destiny, which he sees in a bowl of water, and smiles. Yeshua offers to heal the mother, whom he gives a kiss, but she refuses and Yeshua leaves for Jerusalem, where he prepares to confront his destiny. On the way the demon tells him that he is tired of walking, as Yeshua carries on the demon tells him he will be there in his final moments, and to say hello to his father when he sees him. Yeshua, on the cross, sees a bird hovering in front of him.

The last scene shows two modern-day travelers, a man and woman, surveying the hilly landscape.

== Cast ==
- Ewan McGregor as Yeshua and The Demon
- Tye Sheridan as Son
- Ciarán Hinds as Father
- Ayelet Zurer as Mother
- Susan Gray as the Demonic Woman

== Production ==
On February 1, 2014, the cinematographer Emmanuel Lubezki told Deadline Hollywood that he was going to work on a film in the desert with his friend Rodrigo García and Ewan McGregor. He said "It's a tiny little beautiful, extraordinary script that Rodrigo wrote that we’re going to shoot for five weeks." On February 5, 2014 two actors, Ewan McGregor and Tye Sheridan, joined the film cast. McGregor plays the dual roles of a holy man and a demon. The film is written and directed by Rodrigo García, while Division Films and Mockingbird Pictures produced the film. Ayelet Zurer and Ciarán Hinds play the roles of Sheridan's character's parents. The film premiered at the 2015 Sundance Film Festival. The movie was shot at Anza-Borrego Desert State Park in the Colorado Desert of Southern California.

The film was awarded the Dolby Family fellowship, a grant that allows filmmakers to finish their sound design and mix in Dolby Atmos. Sound Designers and Re-recording mixers J.M. Davey and Zach Seivers completed the original sound design and mix as well as the Dolby Atmos remix. Skip Lievsay, who won the Academy Award for Best Sound for his work on Gravity, served as a mentor to Davey and Seivers for the Atmos remix.

== Reception ==
The review aggregator website Rotten Tomatoes reported that 77% of critics have given the film a positive review based on 70 reviews, with an average rating of 6.69/10. The site's critics consensus reads, "Last Days in the Desert offers enough stately grandeur and spiritual exploration to offset an occasionally ambiguous narrative." On Metacritic, the film achieved an average score of 67 out of 100 based on 20 reviews, signifying "generally favorable" reviews.

In his 2015 Sundance review for Vulture, Bilge Ebiri calls the film "haunting," reading its beautiful landscapes as a narrative device. Justin Chang echoes the sentiment for Variety, writing of "the crystalline beauty of the cinematography." Beyond Emmanuel Lubezki's photography, however, others call the drama [also] arid in places.

Several reviewers note the combination of a spiritual story with broader appeal via its tale of familial relationships, especially between fathers and sons. McGregor had a similar observation about his role in the film, saying: "It’s not telling a Biblical story. I think it’s a film about fathers and sons. Jesus and God are the ultimate father and son relationship."
