= The Disappearance of Eleanor Rigby =

- Theatrical release poster
- Directed by: Ned Benson
- Written by: Ned Benson
- Produced by: Cassandra Kulukundis; Ned Benson; Jessica Chastain; Todd J. Labarowski; Emanuel Michael
- Starring: Jessica Chastain; James McAvoy; Nina Arianda; Viola Davis; Bill Hader; Ciarán Hinds; Isabelle Huppert; William Hurt; Jess Weixler
- Cinematography: Christopher Blauvelt
- Edited by: Kristina Boden
- Music by: Ryan Lott (under the alias Son Lux)
- Production companies: Division Films; Dreambridge Films; Myriad Pictures; Unison Films
- Distributed by: The Weinstein Company
- Release dates: September 9, 2013 (Him/Her TIFF); October 10, 2014 (Him/Her U.S.); May 17, 2014 (Them Cannes); September 12, 2014 (Them U.S.)
- Running time: 96 minutes (Him); 105 minutes (Her); 123 minutes (Them)
- Country: United States
- Language: English
- Box office: $1.6 million (all versions)

The Disappearance of Eleanor Rigby is the collective title of three films written and directed by Ned Benson in his directorial debut, and starring Jessica Chastain and James McAvoy, alongside a supporting cast of Viola Davis, Bill Hader, Katherine Waterston, Ciarán Hinds, Isabelle Huppert, and William Hurt. After the film split into three parts, Him and Her were screened at the 2013 Toronto International Film Festival as a "work in progress". Them premiered in the Un Certain Regard section of the 2014 Cannes Film Festival. Them premiered in the United States on September 12, 2014, while Him and Her were released together as double feature on October 10, 2014.

== Plot ==
The films follow the same time but are told from the differing perspectives of Conor Ludlow and Eleanor Rigby, a young married couple living in New York. Him looks at their relationship from Conor's angle, while Her follows Eleanor's. Them has the two films edited into a linear story. These versions were used on DVD, Blu-ray and broadcasts. Conor works at a restaurant, while his wife Eleanor attends college. The couple encounters a life changing event that threatens the stability of their marriage. Eleanor's parents named her after the Beatles song "Eleanor Rigby", as they met waiting for a rumored concert.

=== Him ===
During a meal in a restaurant, Conor reveals to his date, Eleanor, that he lacked the money to pay for the bill. The two dine and dash. Years later, Conor runs a pub and is married to Eleanor. On a break, he visits Eleanor in their apartment, where she is depressed and confined to her bed after the death of their son. She tells him that she dreamed that he had an affair and she thinks it would be better for them if he did cheat on her. Conor is upset by what she is saying but dismisses it. The following day, returning home, he finds the apartment empty and receives a phone call that Eleanor has been hospitalized following a suicide attempt. At the hospital Eleanor tells him she wants to separate and asks him to let her disappear for a while. Shortly after, Eleanor disconnects her phone and cuts off all communication.

Now living in their apartment alone, Conor moves back in with his father. While discussing the failure of his marriage with his best friend Stu, Stu reveals to Conor that he saw Eleanor and believes she is taking classes at NYU. Conor begins to follow Eleanor. Eventually, he goes to one of her classes and passes her a note saying "Hi". Eleanor leaves the class and the two have an angry confrontation, with Eleanor insisting that he leave her alone. Conor is hit by a taxi cab as he leaves and Eleanor stays with him until the ambulance arrives. After going over the bills for his restaurant, Conor realizes they are losing money and cannot keep afloat. Depressed, he has a one-night stand with Alexis, the bartender. Conor goes to Eleanor's parents' home to try to see her but instead is confronted by his mother-in-law, Mary, who gives him little information and suggests that he and Eleanor want different things now. Shortly afterwards, Eleanor comes by the pub and the two rent a car and go for a drive. He tells her that he will be packing up their apartment the following week as he can no longer hold onto it.

When it begins to rain and the windshield wipers do not work, the two begin to kiss but Conor confesses he has slept with someone else. The two return to the city. Conor throws a closing party for his restaurant. While there, he sees a young couple on a date and notices that they try to dine and dash. He follows them, chasing down the man and tackling him but he decides to let him go. Conor goes to his former apartment to clean it out. He falls asleep and when he wakes Eleanor is there. The two talk about their son and Eleanor reveals she can no longer remember what he looked like. Conor tells her that he mostly looked like Eleanor but with his eyes. The two sleep together but by the time Conor wakes up, Eleanor is gone. Sometime later, Conor works at his father's restaurant. He decides to take a walk before the late night rush. As he walks, he does not notice he is being followed by a woman who appears to be Eleanor.

=== Her ===
While biking over the Manhattan Bridge, Eleanor Rigby decides to kill herself and climbs the barrier and throws herself into the East River. She is rescued. At the hospital she is collected by her sister, Katy, who brings her back to their parents' home where Katy, along with her young son, are also living. Unsure of what to do with her life, Eleanor decides to listen to her father's suggestion that she re-enroll in school. She talks her way into late registration in professor Lilian Friedman's class and the two become friendly. Eleanor's father attempts to get her to see a psychiatrist. It is revealed that Eleanor has recently lost a son and has been incapable of coping with the grief. In class one day, Eleanor is handed a note and realizes it has been sent to her by Conor. She leaves class and the two have a heated argument, where she tells him to leave her alone. Finally assenting, Conor leaves, only to be hit by a passing car. Eleanor reveals to the taxi cab driver who hit him that Conor is her husband. Conor is only mildly injured by the incident, and before he goes to the hospital, he asks if he can see Eleanor again. After Katy tells Eleanor that Conor has been by the house, Eleanor goes to see him at his restaurant, where she learns it is failing. She suggests that they rent a car and go driving aimlessly, something that she had once suggested they do when they were dating.

Conor rents the car but it begins to rain heavily and their windshield wiper is broken, making driving impossible. While they wait for the rain to pass, Eleanor tries to initiate sex but Conor stops her and Eleanor realizes he has slept with someone else during their separation. She tells him it doesn't matter but on the return trip home, she gets out of the car early and takes a moment to gather herself before continuing home. That evening, Eleanor and Katy go clubbing. Eleanor tries to pick up a stranger to have a one-night stand but finds herself unable to go through with it. Instead, she later goes to her former apartment to see Conor. She tells him she can no longer remember what their child looked like and he tells her that their son looked like her. The two have sex but Eleanor leaves and returns home. At her mother's suggestion, she decides to leave for Paris and finish the anthropology dissertation she abandoned when she met Conor. As she says goodbye to her family, her nephew asks when she will return and is told she will come back next summer. Sometime later, Eleanor returns to New York City. She pursues and calls out to Conor.

== Cast ==
- Jessica Chastain as Eleanor Rigby
- James McAvoy as Conor Ludlow
- Viola Davis as Professor Lillian Friedman
- William Hurt as Julian Rigby
- Isabelle Huppert as Mary Rigby
- Jess Weixler as Katy Rigby
- Bill Hader as Stuart
- Ciarán Hinds as Spencer Ludlow
- Katherine Waterston as Charlie
- Nina Arianda as Alexis

== Production ==
In February 2012, Variety announced that Chastain and Joel Edgerton had been signed to star in The Disappearance of Eleanor Rigby, with screenwriter Benson set to direct the two films. However, Edgerton was replaced by James McAvoy in May 2012. William Hurt was named to be starring in both films, but in an unspecified role. Filming began in summer of 2012 in New York City, with filming lasting for forty days and wrapping around late August of the same year. Of the film, Myriad executive Kirk D'Amico stated that the films' characters were "complex, and it is unique to have two different scripts to tell the story". Chastain and McAvoy later starred in the films, Dark Phoenix and It Chapter Two.

== Release ==
Myriad Pictures initially began pre-selling the rights to the two films at the 2012 Cannes Film Festival, with the films being sold in nine territories. After the film's Toronto premiere, The Weinstein Company acquired domestic distribution rights to the film for $3 million. On June 27, 2014, The Weinstein Company released the first trailer for the film.

== Reception ==
The Disappearance of Eleanor Rigby was met with generally positive reviews. On Rotten Tomatoes, the film has a rating of 66%, based on 90 reviews, with an average rating of 6.44/10. The website's critical consensus reads: "Led by strong performances from Jessica Chastain and James McAvoy, The Disappearance of Eleanor Rigby is a hauntingly original rumination on love and loss." Metacritic gives Them a weighted average score of 57 out of 100, based on 33 critics, indicating "mixed or average reviews"; Him and Her received "generally favorable reviews", with scores of 63 out of 100 based on 11 critics and 67 out of 100 based on 12 critics.
