= 5 to 7 =

2014 film by Victor Levin

- Theatrical release poster
- Directed by: Victor Levin
- Written by: Victor Levin
- Produced by: Julie Lynn; Bonnie Curtis; Sam Englebardt; William D. Johnson
- Starring: Anton Yelchin; Bérénice Marlohe; Olivia Thirlby; Lambert Wilson; Frank Langella; Glenn Close
- Cinematography: Arnaud Potier
- Edited by: Matt Maddox
- Music by: Danny Bensi; Saunder Jurriaans
- Production companies: Mockingbird Pictures; Demarest Films
- Distributed by: IFC Films
- Release dates: April 19, 2014 (Tribeca); April 3, 2015 (United States)
- Running time: 95 minutes
- Country: United States
- Languages: English; French
- Box office: $674,579

5 to 7 is a 2014 American romantic comedy-drama film written and directed by Victor Levin and starring Anton Yelchin, Bérénice Marlohe, Olivia Thirlby, Lambert Wilson, Frank Langella, and Glenn Close. Yelchin plays Brian, a 24-year-old writer who has an affair with a 33-year-old married French woman, Arielle (Marlohe). Arielle and her middle-aged husband, Valéry (Wilson), have an agreement allowing them to have extramarital affairs as long as they are confined to the hours between 5 and 7 p.m, borrowed from the French cinq à sept.

The film's premise was inspired by a French couple in an open marriage whom Levin met in the 1980s. Though he completed the film's first draft in 2007, the project remained in development for seven further years due to casting issues. Diane Kruger was initially cast as Arielle but was replaced by Marlohe. Filming began in May 2013 in New York City and mainly took place on the Upper East Side of Manhattan.

5 to 7 premiered at the Tribeca Film Festival on April 19, 2014. It was also screened at the 2014 Traverse City Film Festival, where it won the Audience Award for Best American Film. The film was released theatrically in the United States on April 3, 2015, by IFC Films. It grossed $674,579 at the worldwide box office and received mixed reviews from critics.

== Plot ==
Brian Bloom, a struggling 24-year-old Jewish writer in New York City, meets Arielle Pierpont, a 33-year-old French former model, while she is smoking outside the St. Regis Hotel one Friday afternoon. As they strike up a conversation, Brian tells Arielle that he associates her name with Ariel from The Little Mermaid. They develop an instant connection and agree to meet again the following Friday.

After their first date, at the Guggenheim, Arielle reveals that she is married to a much older French diplomat, Valéry, and they have two young children. Arielle and Valéry have an agreement that each is permitted to have extramarital affairs as long as they are limited to the time between 5 and 7 p.m. on weeknights. Brian is perplexed at this information and tells Arielle that he cannot continue to see her, believing it to be unethical. She says that, should he change his mind, she will continue to smoke on Fridays outside the St. Regis.

Three weeks later, Brian decides to meet again with Arielle. She gives him a hotel key and in the evening at the hotel room, they consummate their relationship. They begin to meet regularly at the same hotel room in the evenings.

Valéry, who is aware of Brian's affair with Arielle, approaches him on the street and invites him to his house for dinner. There, Brian meets Arielle and Valéry's children and is introduced to Valéry's mistress, 25-year-old editor Jane Hastings. Arielle later meets Brian's traditional Jewish parents, Sam and Arlene. Upon learning that Arielle is an older, married mother of two, Sam tells Brian that he disapproves of the relationship, while Arlene accepts that they love each other despite the circumstances.

When Brian is invited to a New Yorker ceremony to receive an award for one of his short stories, he is joined by Arielle, Valéry, Jane, and his parents. Jane tells Brian that her boss Jonathan Galassi, a publisher, has read his story and wants him to write a novel.

Brian meets Arielle at the hotel room and asks her to marry him, giving her a non-traditional engagement ring. Arielle feels that Brian has betrayed her trust, but he insists that he is truly in love with her, and she eventually accepts his proposal, telling him to meet her the next day at the hotel. Valéry shows up at Brian's apartment that night, slapping him and expressing anger at his betrayal of the rules and boundaries of an open marriage. He then gives Brian a check for $250,000 for Brian to give Arielle the life she deserves, and he leaves.

The next day, the hotel doorman gives Brian a letter from Arielle. In it, she explains that, although she loves him deeply, she cannot leave her husband and children, and asks him not to contact her again, leaving Brian heartbroken. Jane later ends her relationship with Valéry because it feels like a betrayal of her friendship with Brian. When Brian's first novel, The Mermaid, is published by Galassi, Jane excitedly shows Brian copies of the book on display at a local bookstore, and he stares nonchalantly at the book. Shortly after Brian and Jane leave in a taxi, Arielle walks past the bookstore and smiles when she sees Brian's book.

A few years later, Brian is walking down the street with his wife, Kiva, and their two-year-old son Charlie. They run into Arielle, Valéry, and their now-teenage children outside the Guggenheim. Valéry asks Brian about Jane, and Brian tells him that she is married with a son. Arielle discreetly removes one of her gloves and shows Brian that she still wears the ring he gave to her before they part again.

== Cast ==
- Anton Yelchin as Brian Bloom
- Bérénice Marlohe as Arielle Pierpont
- Olivia Thirlby as Jane Hastings
- Lambert Wilson as Valéry Pierpont
- Frank Langella as Sam Bloom
- Glenn Close as Arlene Bloom
- Eric Stoltz as Jonathan Galassi
- Jocelyn DeBoer as Kiva Bloom

== Production ==
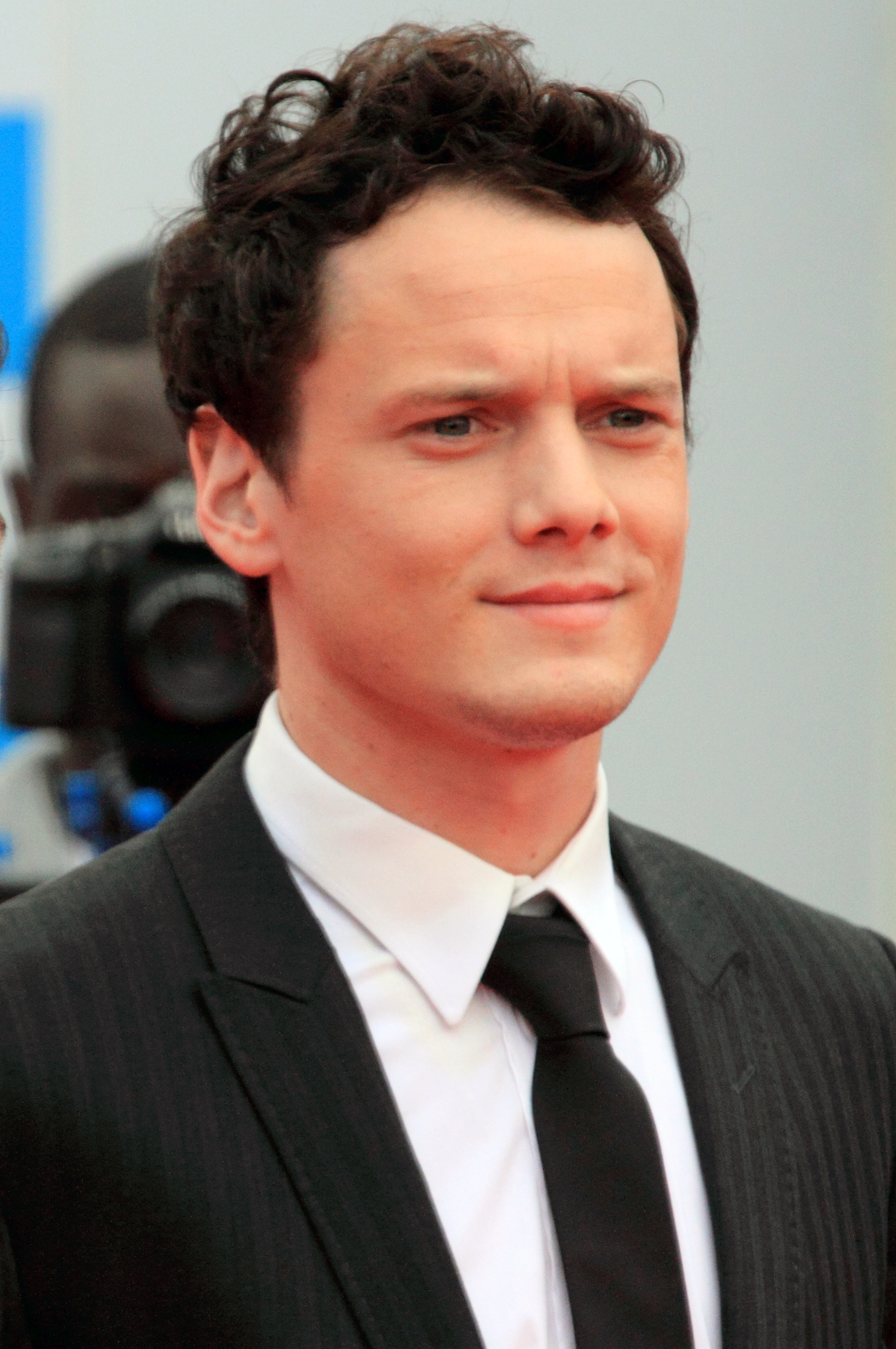
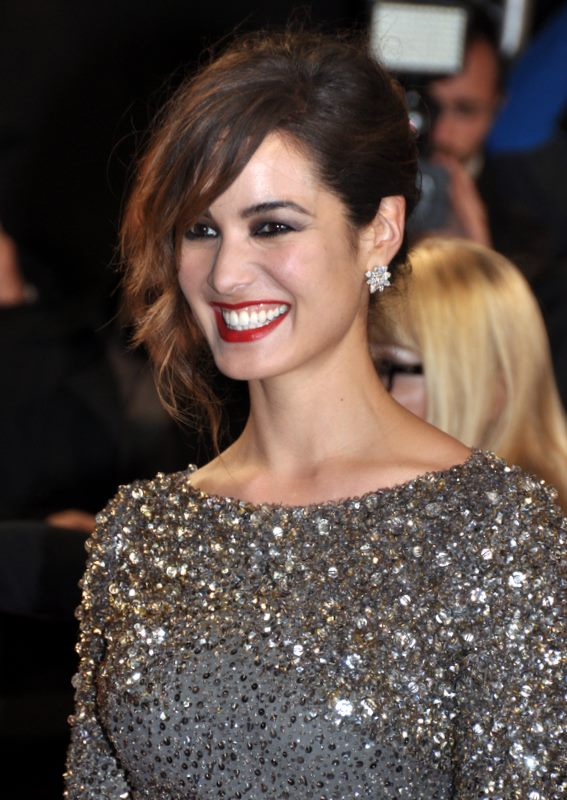
Anton Yelchin and Bérénice Marlohe play the lead roles.

The story of 5 to 7 was inspired by a couple whom writer-director Victor Levin met in France in 1987. The couple had an open marriage; each spouse had an extramarital lover and, according to Levin, "they were all terribly civilized with the arrangement". After meeting the couple, Levin "filed away" the idea until he could work out how to incorporate it into a larger story. He conceived the complete plot after his children's birth in the early 2000s. Levin wrote the first draft of the film in March 2007. His agent at William Morris Endeavor introduced him to Julie Lynn, who read the script and agreed to produce it. In 2011, Lynn partnered with Bonnie Curtis, who also became a producer on the film. The project remained in development for seven years due to difficulties in finding appropriately "box office-eligible" actors whose schedules lined up. The budget was primarily financed by Demarest Films, with additional funding from private investors including Sam Englebardt, David Greathouse and Bill Johnson.

Levin approached Anton Yelchin to star in 5 to 7 after seeing the actor's performance in the 2011 film Like Crazy. He wrote Yelchin a "beseeching" letter asking him to accept the role; Yelchin never received the letter but nevertheless agreed to star in the film. In 2012, it was announced that Diane Kruger had been cast as Yelchin's lover, but she was later replaced by Bérénice Marlohe. Glenn Close was cast through Curtis and Lynn, who had produced Close's 2011 film Albert Nobbs and remained close friends with her.

Filming was originally scheduled to begin in February 2013, but was delayed until May 2013. The film was shot by cinematographer Arnaud Potier on an Arri Alexa camera in CinemaScope widescreen format. Levin and Potier decided to use minimalistic wide shots and long takes to avoid "reminding the audience that it's a movie" with unnecessary cuts. Filming mainly took place on the Upper East Side of New York City. Specific filming locations included the Carlyle Hotel, the St. Regis Hotel, the Guggenheim, Fifth Avenue, Grand Army Plaza, Le Charlot restaurant and Crawford Doyle Booksellers. The only major location used outside of the Upper East Side was Brian's apartment, which was filmed on 30th Street in Midtown Manhattan. Shots of plaques on Central Park benches are interspersed throughout the film; Levin sent a group of interns to find interesting inscriptions on the benches in Central Park and selected about thirty that were filmed on the last day of shooting. The crew adopted a bench of their own whose plaque is shown at the end of the film's credits.

Levin initially planned to use a jazz soundtrack but found classical music more apt after completing the filming. He hired Danny Bensi and Saunder Jurriaans to compose the film's score, which consisted of two main melodies, one a waltz and the other a more classical theme.

== Release ==
5 to 7 premiered at the Tribeca Film Festival on April 19, 2014, and went on to be screened at the Traverse City Film Festival, Savannah Film Festival, Denver Film Festival, Palm Springs International Film Festival, Cinequest Film Festival, Hamptons International Film Festival, Carmel International Film Festival, Virginia Film Festival Boulder International Film Festival, and Bermuda International Film Festival. It won the Audience Award for Best American Film at the Traverse City Film Festival, and was nominated for Best Narrative Feature at the Bermuda International Film Festival.

IFC Films acquired the US distribution rights to the film in June 2014. It opened in theaters in New York City and Los Angeles on April 3, 2015, grossing $18,006 from two locations on its opening weekend. It later expanded to 26 theaters and earned a total of $162,685 from six weeks in American theaters. Outside the United States, the film was most successful in Mexico (where it grossed $259,757) and Russia (where it grossed $120,909); it earned a total of $511,894 internationally, making a total worldwide gross of $674,579.

== Reception ==
On the review aggregator website Rotten Tomatoes, the film holds an approval rating of 70% based on 56 reviews, with an average rating of 5.8/10. The website's critics consensus reads, "5 to 7 too often settles for rom-com clichés, but they're offset by its charming stars, sensitive direction, and a deceptively smart screenplay." Metacritic, which uses a weighted average, assigned the film a score of 52 out of 100, based on 22 critics, indicating "mixed or average" reviews.

The San Francisco Chronicle's Mick LaSalle enjoyed the film and praised Marlohe's performance in particular. He felt that 5 to 7 was "in that rare category of romantic drama that seems aimed for a male audience", comparing Yelchin's role to that of Kristen Stewart in The Twilight Saga. Variety critic Peter Debruge commended Levin for his "earnest, heart-on-his-sleeve approach", referring to the film as "courageously sentimental in an age of irony". He also highlighted the "elegant, traditional" classical score and minimalist cinematography. John DeFore of The Hollywood Reporter opined that 5 to 7 was "sumptuous and romantic in an attractively old-fashioned way" despite its clichéd plot devices. He praised Potier's "dreamily hazy" cinematography and Yelchin's performance. Betsy Sharkey of the Los Angeles Times found the film "charm[ing]" in spite of what it lacked in plot and character development. She credited the cinematography, music, production design and costumes with giving the film "a kind of gauzy loveliness". Peter Keough, who awarded the film 2.5 out of 4 stars for The Boston Globe, felt that the film relied on stereotypes and cliché but nevertheless offered "refreshing innovations" to the romance genre. He praised Marlohe's performance and the comic relief provided by "the oddly but perfectly cast Glenn Close and Frank Langella".

The New York Times' chief film critic Manohla Dargis found the plot of 5 to 7 to be inauthentic and the characters "unpersuasive". She criticized Marlohe's "opaque, physically stiff" performance and the similarities of the film to Woody Allen's Manhattan-based works. The Washington Post's Ann Hornaday also felt that the film lacked authenticity, writing that it "feels more constructed than lived". She praised Yelchin's "modest, endearing lead performance" but found Arielle's character underdeveloped. Rodrigo Perez of The Playlist referred to 5 to 7 as "groan-worthy", "sappy and painfully jejune." He found the premise implausible and melodramatic and Brian's character uninteresting and two-dimensional, a stand-in for "an adolescent male fantasy". The Village Voice's Amy Nicholson also felt that Brian was an unsympathetic character and that his relationship with Arielle was not believable. She criticized the film's reliance on national stereotypes and the "artistic-martyr trope".
