= Go Fish Pictures =

Former American film company

- Type: Division
- Genre: Various
- Founded: 2000; 26 years ago
- Founder: Jeffrey Katzenberg
- Defunct: 2007; 19 years ago
- Fate: Closed down
- Headquarters: Universal City, California, United States
- Key people: Austin O. Furst Jr.
- Products: Motion pictures
- Parent: DreamWorks Pictures
- Website: gofishpictures.com (Archived on Wayback Machine)

Go Fish Pictures was an American film production and distribution company and a division of DreamWorks SKG. The company was founded in 2000 in order to release arthouse, independent, and foreign films. The division was initially successful with the anime films Millennium Actress and Ghost in the Shell 2: Innocence in 2003 and 2004, respectively. This led to venturing into live-action films with the releases of The Chumscrubber and The Prize Winner of Defiance, Ohio.

However, following the critical and commercial failure of The Chumscrubber, DreamWorks shut down the division in 2007 shortly after the release of the Japanese film Casshern.

== Filmography ==
| Title | Release date | Notes |
|---|---|---|
| Millennium Actress | September 14, 2002 (Japan); September 12, 2003 (USA) | Distribution outside Asia only |
| Ghost in the Shell 2: Innocence | March 6, 2004 (Japan); September 17, 2004 (USA) | Distribution outside Asia only |
| The Chumscrubber | August 26, 2005 (USA) | North American distribution only; co-production with El Camino Pictures and Newmarket Films |
| The Prize Winner of Defiance, Ohio | October 14, 2005 | North American distribution excluding free and pay television only; produced by Revolution Studios and ImageMovers; released under the main DreamWorks Pictures label for home media releases |
| Casshern | April 24, 2004 (Japan); October 16, 2007 (USA) | North American distribution only; released through Paramount Pictures in the United States |
