= Kimiko Itoh =

Japanese jazz singer (born 1946)

- Born: Kimiko Itoh; July 11, 1946 (age 80); Kagawa Prefecture, Japan
- Origin: Japan
- Genres: Jazz
- Occupation: Singer
- Years active: 1982–present
- Labels: Record Teichiku, Epikkusonirekodo, Columbia, Video Arts Music, One Voice Records, PM Music
- Website: http://www.kimikoitoh.com/

Kimiko Itō or Kimiko Itoh (伊藤 君子, Itō Kimiko; born July 11, 1946) is a Japanese jazz singer. She was born on the island of Shikoku in Kagawa Prefecture, Japan.

After graduating from Musashino Art University with a degree in oil painting, she studied under Yasushi Sawada.

In 1982, she made her debut with her first jazz album, "Birdland". In 1989, she released the album "フォロー・ミー(FOLLOW ME)" simultaneously in Japan and the United States. It ranked 16th in the Radio & Records Contemporary Jazz charts. Swing Journal (スイングジャーナル) voted Kimiko Number 1 female vocalist in 1988–1996.

In 2004, her cover of the song "River of Crystals" from her album "Follow Me" was featured in the Mamoru Oshii-directed film Ghost in the Shell: Innocence.

== History ==
- 1982 Released first album "Birdland".
- 1986 Joined EPIC/Sony Records. Won Japanese jazz vocal prize.
- 1987 Released album "For Lovers Only".
- 1988 "For Lovers Only", from CBS Columbia.
- 1989 Released "Follow Me" ranks 16th in Radio & Records' contemporary jazz list.
- 1990 Released album "A Natural Woman".
- 1992 Wins Swing Journal grand prix jazz disk for Japanese vocalist.
- 1993 Released album "Standards My Way". Won 1993 Swing Journal jazz disk grand prix for Japanese vocalist.
- 1994 Performed live at the Japan Society Hall in New York City. Performance went on sale as "Evening with Kimiko Itoh" in CD, videotape and laser disc formats
- 1996 Released album “Sophisticated Lady”
- 1997 Performed at the Montreux Jazz Festival as a duo with Makoto Ozone. Released "At the Montreux Jazz Festival" recorded live.
- 2000 Released album "Kimiko", produced by Makoto Ozone. Won 2000 Swing Journal jazz disk grand prix for Japanese vocalist.

Several of Kimiko Itoh's recordings are available from Videoarts Music.

== Discography ==
=== Albums ===
- Birdland (1982)
- Songs for You (1983)
- The Way We Were (1983)
- A Touch of Love (1986)
- For Lovers Only (1986)
- Follow Me (1988)
- Jazzy Wonderland (1990)
- A Natural Woman (1990)
- The Best of Kimiko Itoh (1991)
- Here I Am (1992)
- Standards My Way (1993)
- An Evening with Kimiko Itoh (1994)
- Sophisticated Lady (1995)
- At The Montreux Jazz Festival (1997)
- Kimiko (2000)
- Once You've Been in Love (2004)
- Best of Best (2007)
- Jazzdaga? Jazzdaja! (2007)
