= The Sweet Life (film) =

- Directed by: Rob Spera
- Written by: Jared Rappaport
- Produced by: Bonnie Curtis; Julie Lynn
- Starring: Chris Messina; Abigail Spencer
- Cinematography: Gavin Kelly
- Edited by: Matt Maddox
- Music by: Jeff Beal
- Production company: Mockingbird Pictures
- Distributed by: The Orchard
- Release date: June 7, 2016 (LA Film Festival)
- Running time: 90 minutes
- Country: United States
- Language: English

The Sweet Life is a 2016 American comedy-drama film directed by Rob Spera. It stars Chris Messina and Abigail Spencer as two depressed people who take a road trip to commit suicide at the Golden Gate Bridge.

== Plot ==
After a long day with no sales, Kenny Pantalio, an ice cream salesman for The Sweet Life, goes to a bridge. There, he meets Lolita Nowicki, an actuary. The two discuss their suicidal feelings and discover that they have the same therapist, Frank. They walk through Chicago, discussing the various forms of therapy suggested by Frank. As they pass a hotel, a man in a Mercedes mistakes Kenny for a valet and hands him the car keys. Lolita takes them and encourages Kenny to join her on a road trip to the Golden Gate Bridge, where they can both commit suicide. Kenny hesitates but goes along with her.

Their first stop is at a convenience store, where Lolita impulsively tells the clerk that Kenny has a gun. The clerk says that he must see the gun before he can give them any money, and they admit that they do not have one. After they leave, Kenny says that he is embarrassed, but Lolita says that he is boring and takes few chances in life. They notice two hillbilly hitchhikers by the side of the road, and Lolita demands that they stop and give them a ride. The hitchhikers, Marlon and Brandon, decline their offer. Lolita tries to convince them to get in the car. They continue to refuse until Kenny says that he has a gun. After they get in the car, the men, who are married, say they are traveling to a UFO museum to scatter the ashes of Marlon's late grandmother. Affected by their hard-luck tale, Lolita gives them the Mercedes without consulting Kenny, prompting the duo to argue.

The next morning, Kenny steals a car. To their shock, they find a human kidney in storage on the back seat. A call to the cell phone in the car reveals that the kidney is overdue for a transplant. On the way to the hospital, they are pulled over. Lolita convinces the cops to give them a police escort. At the hospital, the patient's family thanks them. Kenny and Lolita stop at a motel. Lolita tries to initiate sex, but Kenny explains that he is impotent, and he cannot perform. The county sheriff arrives to tell them the kidney transplant was a success but that he knows the car is stolen. He drops them off at a bus station to leave town.

On the bus, Kenny checks Lolita's cell phone and discovers that Frank has been sending her text messages. Kenny asks if she is having sex with Frank, and they argue. Lolita leaves Kenny and gets a ride with several men while Kenny continues on the bus. Kenny then sees Lolita fighting with the men on the side of the road. He gets off the bus and confronts them. Lolita produces a pistol. When one of the men insults Lolita, Kenny forces the man at gunpoint to apologize to her. Thankful, Lolita suggests to Kenny that they continue traveling together. They stop to visit Kenny's ex-fiancee. He asks why she left him at the altar, and she says that he was directionless. Marlon and Brandon pick up Kenny and Lolita in the Mercedes, and they drive the rest of the way to the museum. Marlon and Brandon leave the Mercedes when they learn that it is stolen, and Kenny and Lolita proceed to California.

Lolita pays for a luxury suite at a high-class hotel, explaining that their road trip would have been pointless had she previously used her credit card. They go to visit Lolita's mother, and Lolita reveals that her real name is Alma. Kenny helps her reconcile with her mother, who is suffering from Alzheimer's disease. Lolita says that the disease runs in her family. They go back to the hotel room. Lolita reads Kenny her poetry, and they have sex. When Kenny wakes up afterwards, he sees that Lolita is gone. He rushes to the Golden Gate Bridge, where Lolita is about to jump into the water. He says that he is also going to jump, and she stops him from doing so. The two then decide to live and to be together.

== Cast ==
- Chris Messina as Kenny Pantalio
- Abigail Spencer as Lolita Nowicki
- Maggie Siff as Ava
- Tyson Ritter as Marlon
- J. D. Evermore as Brandon
- Jayne Brook as Katherine
- Karan Soni as Convenience store clerk
- Nick Searcy as County sheriff

== Reception ==
Sheri Linden of The Hollywood Reporter called it "equal parts rom-com contrivance and soulful chemistry". Linden said Spencer's character is not believable but praised Messina's acting and chemistry with Spencer.
