= Millennium Actress =

2001 Japanese anime film by Satoshi Kon

- Theatrical release poster
- Directed by: Satoshi Kon
- Screenplay by: Sadayuki Murai; Satoshi Kon
- Story by: Satoshi Kon
- Produced by: Taro Maki
- Starring: Miyoko Shōji; Mami Koyama; Fumiko Orikasa; Shōzō Iizuka; Shōko Tsuda; Hirotaka Suzuoki; Hisako Kyōda; Kōichi Yamadera; Masane Tsukayama
- Cinematography: Hisao Shirai
- Edited by: Satoshi Terauchi
- Music by: Susumu Hirasawa
- Production company: Madhouse
- Distributed by: The KlockWorx
- Release dates: July 28, 2001 (Fantasia Film Festival); September 14, 2002 (Japan)
- Running time: 87 minutes
- Country: Japan
- Language: Japanese
- Budget: $1.2 million
- Box office: $262,891 (US)

Millennium Actress (Japanese: 千年女優, Hepburn: Sennen Joyū) is a 2001 Japanese animated drama film co-written and directed by Satoshi Kon and produced by Madhouse. Loosely based on the lives of actresses Setsuko Hara and Hideko Takamine, it tells the story of two documentary filmmakers investigating the life of a retired acting legend. As she tells them the story of her life, the borderline between cinema and reality gradually becomes blurred.

== Plot ==
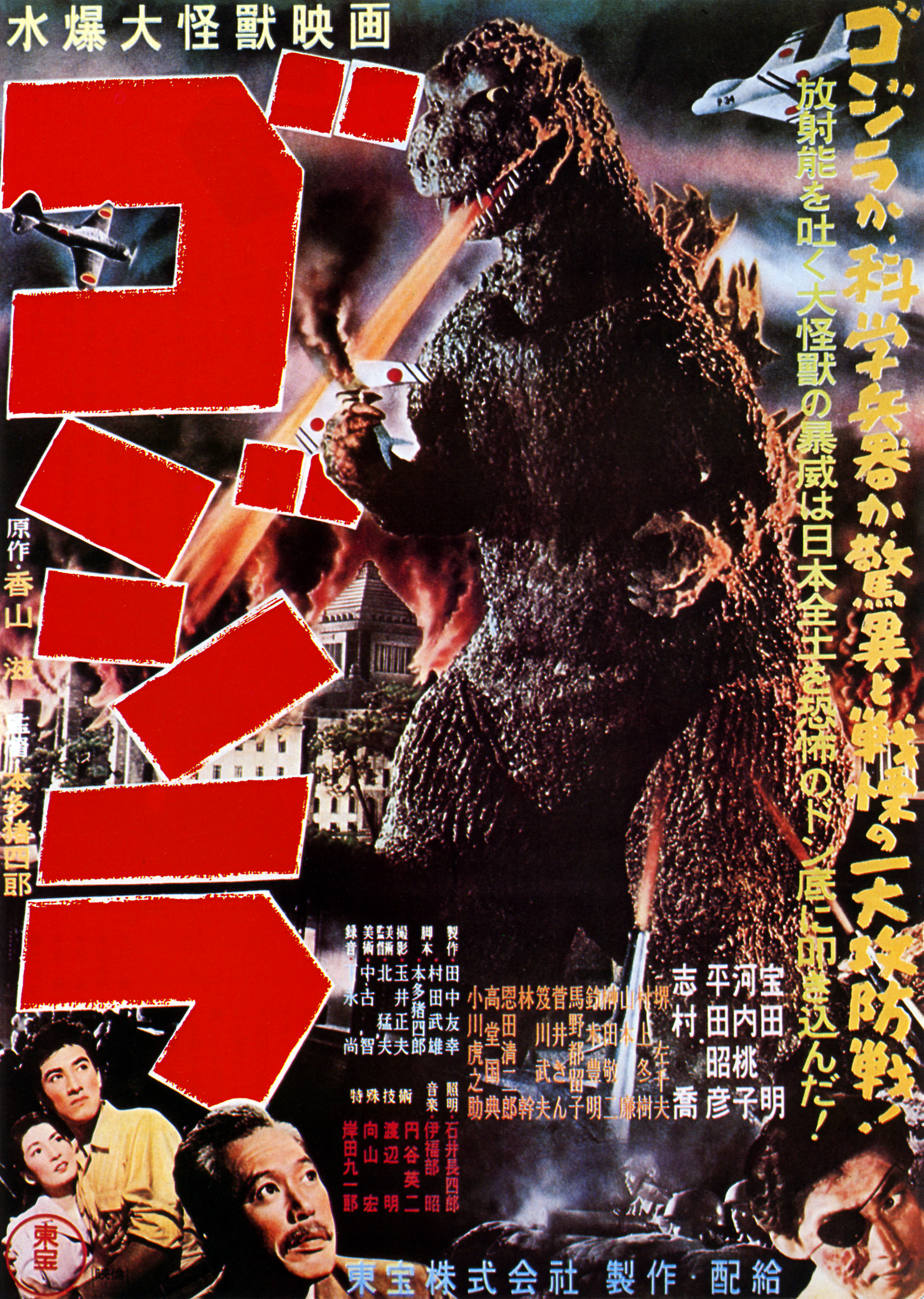
The story references Japanese films including Throne of Blood and the original Godzilla (pictured).

Chiyoko Fujiwara, a renowned former actress and prominent star for film company Ginei, accepts a request for a retrospective interview amidst the demolition of the company's obsolete studio, her first interview in thirty years after her sudden retirement from the entertainment industry. Documentarian Genya Tachibana, a fan of Chiyoko, visits her house with his cameraman Kyoji Ida. Genya gives Chiyoko a small box containing an old-fashioned key. She remarks that the key "opens the most important thing" and begins reflecting on her life.

Chiyoko was born during the 1923 Great Kantō earthquake, which took the life of her father. As a schoolgirl, she is scouted by Ginei's general manager to appear in a government-sponsored film to inspire troops serving in the Second Sino-Japanese War. While her mother opposes, intending for Chiyoko to inherit the family's confectionery store, Chiyoko remains uncertain. She meets a political dissident painter being pursued by police and hides him in her home's storehouse. The next day, he leaves for Manchuria to join his allies, leaving Chiyoko the key to his box of art supplies. Chiyoko fails to catch him before his train departs, but vows to reunite with him. Genya tearfully recognizes this as a scene from one of Chiyoko's films; from this point forward, Chiyoko's memories and films become intertwined.

Recalling that Ginei's film is set in Manchuria, Chiyoko becomes an actress and travels there in the hopes of reuniting with the artist. She meets the general manager's nephew, aspiring director Junichi Ōtaki, and Ginei's lead actress, Eiko Shimao. During filming, Chiyoko is led to northern Manchuria by a fortuneteller bribed by Eiko. Her train is attacked by bandits before the setting shifts to a burning Sengoku period castle; Chiyoko, in the role of a princess, is tricked by an old wraith into drinking a cursed tea that will cause her to "burn forever in the flames of eternal love". In Chiyoko's continuing search for the artist, the setting and Chiyoko's role changes in quick succession, ranging from a courtesan in a brothel at the end of the Edo period to a schoolgirl in the Taishō era. Her family's store is destroyed in an air raid, but on a surviving wall, she finds a portrait of her painted by the artist and a promise of their reunion.

After World War II, Chiyoko's career flourishes, but she never forgets the artist. One day during filming, Eiko secretly steals the key. When asked by the film crew about the significance of the key, Chiyoko despondently realizes that she can no longer remember the artist's face, and resigns herself to a married life with Junichi. She eventually finds the key hidden in their home and confronts Junichi about it; Junichi, having been aware of Eiko's role in the fortuneteller incident, coerced her into stealing the key on his behalf in order to secure Chiyoko's hand in marriage. Eiko admits to being motivated by jealousy toward Chiyoko's youth and innocence. An old, scarred man who had pursued the artist as a military policeman approaches Chiyoko on a journey of atonement and hands her a letter from the artist. Chiyoko boards an express train to the artist's hometown in Hokkaido, but the conclusion of her trek proves fruitless.

During production of Chiyoko's final film, an earthquake causes the set to collapse. A young Genya, working as an assistant at the time, rescues her. Seeing the wraith in her prop helmet, Chiyoko flees the set and retires from acting. In the present day, Chiyoko, once more seeing the wraith in her reflection, acknowledges that she is no longer the girl the artist had met. Upon the end of the interview, another earthquake strikes, upsetting Chiyoko's fragile health. En route to the hospital, Genya confides to Kyoji that after Chiyoko left for Hokkaido, the policeman confessed to him that he tortured the artist to death. On her deathbed, Chiyoko thanks Genya for rekindling her memories of the artist and reviving the young girl she was before. She concludes that it does not matter if she sees the artist again or not, because what she really loved was the search for him.

== Cast ==
Character	Japanese	English	
Character	Japanese	Village Productions/Manga UK (2005)	VSI/Eleven Arts (2019)
Chiyoko Fujiwara (藤原 千代子, Fujiwara Chiyoko)	Miyoko Shōji (Old); Mami Koyama (Adult); Fumiko Orikasa (Young)	Regina Reagan	Cindy Robinson (Old); Erin Yvette (Adult); Abby Trott (Young)
Genya Tachibana (立花 源也, Tachibana Genya)	Shōzō Iizuka; Masamichi Satō (Young)	John Vernon	Christopher Swindle
Kyōji Ida (井田 恭二, Ida Kyōji)	Masaya Onosaka	Stuart Milligan	Benjamin Diskin
Eiko Shimao (島尾 詠子, Shimao Eiko)	Shōko Tsuda	Jo Lee	Laura Post
Junichi Ōtaki (大滝 諄一, Ōtaki Junichi)	Hirotaka Suzuoki	Stephen Bent	Keith Silverstein
Mino (美濃)	Tomie Kataoka	Samantha Shaw	Mona Marshall
Chief Clerk (番頭, Bantō)	Takkō Ishimori	Unknown	Unknown
Ginei Managing Director (銀映専務, Ginei Senmu)	Kan Tokumaru	John Vernon	Rick Zieff
Chiyoko Fujiwara's Mother (藤原千代子の母, Fujiwara Chiyoko no Haha)	Hisako Kyōda	Felicity Duncan	Barbara Goodson
Man with Key (鍵の君, Kagi no Kimi)	Kōichi Yamadera	David Kitchen	Greg Chun
Man with Scar (傷の男, Kizu no Otoko)	Masane Tsukayama	Matt Devereaux	JP Karliak

== Production ==
Millennium Actress is the second film directed by Satoshi Kon and his first original work, after the highly acclaimed Perfect Blue. It was planned by Masao Maruyama and produced by Taro Maki. The film is partly based on the life of Japanese actress Setsuko Hara.

Following the release of Perfect Blue, Kon considered adapting the Yasutaka Tsutsui novel Paprika (1993) into his next film. However, these plans were stalled when the distribution company for Perfect Blue, Rex Entertainment, went bankrupt.

The project for Millennium Actress came from the words "Let's make a movie that looks like a trompe l'oeil" by Taro Maki, who decided to produce Kon's film because he thought his previous work was amazing. The script writing began with a sentence that Kon came up with: "An old woman who was once touted as a great actress is supposed to be recounting her life story, but her memories get confused and the various roles she played in the past begin to blend into it, creating a tumultuous story." The structure of the story was decided at the rough plot stage when Kon fleshed out this sentence, and the last scene remained intact in the finished film. He then worked with the scenario writer, Sadayuki Murai, and the producer to develop the episodes and detailed character settings to be included in the plot.

Unlike the previous film, which he was hired to direct, this one was his original project, so he was able to express his own opinions, and decided to put more emphasis on the sound, especially the music, and asked Susumu Hirasawa, who had been adored for a long time, to compose the music. There were about 250 staff members in total, and the production period was about two years. The 20 or so main staff members were almost the same as in the previous work, with only the animation director changing. In the previous work, the character design was done by Hisashi Eguchi and the animation director by Hideki Hamasu, but in this work, both were done by Takeshi Honda. The reason for this is that the animation director is a very important and burdensome position, and the animators who have the skills and abilities that Kon would like to work with are usually those prefer to draw key frames rather than the animation director, making it difficult to ask them to continue their work. For the character designs, Honda was chosen because he is someone who draws elegant pictures that can appeal to those outside of the animation community and is genuinely talented in the animation industry, in order to make sure that the movie would have reach audiences both within and outside the spectrum of animation fandom. Some of the character designs were done by Kon himself, and all the posters of Chiyoko in the movie were also drawn by Kon.

This is Kon's last movie to utilize cel animation, as his later works were produced using digital ink-and-paint among other digital methods. And most of the scenes are drawn based on Kon's layout.

The budget was initially 130 million yen, and the final budget was around 100 million and a few tens of millions of yen, one of the lowest production costs for an animated film in Japan.

== Release ==
The film was released in North America on September 12, 2003, distributed by DreamWorks' arthouse and foreign movie publishing company Go Fish Pictures, with a total of six screens.

Theatrical anime distribution company Eleven Arts acquired the North American rights and re-released the film theatrically in its original Japanese language version on August 13, 2019, and in an all-new English dubbed version on August 19, 2019.

=== Box office ===
Commercially, the film performed modestly on its US release earning $18,732 on its opening weekend and $37,285 during its full three-week release. The film was shown almost exclusively in New York and Los Angeles and received a minimal advertising campaign from Go Fish Pictures, a division of DreamWorks SKG. Although the scale of the release was not large, the merit of the theatrical release was not only in the box-office revenue, but also in the fact that critics would view the film and publish reviews and criticisms in general newspapers, magazines and websites, which would raise awareness of the work and reach an audience outside of the hardcore anime fandom.

== Themes ==
Millennium Actress began with a request to make a trompe l'oeil movie such as the previous Perfect Blue. This was a film technique, not a film theme. Both works share the same methodology of "blurring the boundary between fiction and reality," and both works are like two sides of the same coin for Kon. The previous film focused on the negative side of human nature, while this film focuses on the positive side. The previous film depicted the gradual blurring of the boundary between fiction and reality, while this film seamlessly connects fiction and reality from the beginning, and shows the characters freely moving back and forth between fiction and reality. The technique of mixing fiction and reality was used to express the protagonist's uneasy inner world in the previous film, and used in this film for a fun adventure, turning the film from psycho-horror and suspense to a tricky and humorous entertainment.

In the previous film, he tried to confuse the audience by depicting the inner turmoil and chaos of the main character through the mixture of fiction and reality, but in this film, his intention is not to confuse the audience, but to let the audience enjoy the mixture of fiction and reality itself. He aimed to create a film a kind of The Adventures of Old Lady Blowing Smoke by mixing fiction and reality to the point where it becomes meaningless to distinguish between them.

There are various kinds of trompe l'oeil paintings, but one example that Kon gave to the staff was Utagawa Kuniyoshi's ukiyoe "At first glance he looks very fierce, but he is actually a kind person" (みかけハこハゐがとんだいゝ人だ). At first glance, it appears to be the face of a single person, but upon closer inspection, one can see that many people are intertwined, and he likened this characteristic of the painting, "non-faces coming together to form a face," to the concept of this work, "lies piling up to reveal the truth.

The film has a complex structure in which the staff members who visit the legendary actress for an interview experience her life story in a fictional world where the actress' past and the movies she appeared in intersect, making the story a mixture of reality and fiction as well as a tribute to various classic movies. The main character is modeled on Setsuko Hara and Hideko Takamine, and the movies that appear in the film include a period piece in the style of Akira Kurosawa's Throne of Blood, a film by Yasujiro Ozu, a chanbara (sword fighting) story featuring Kurama Tengu, a monster story that borrows images from Godzilla, and a science fiction story.

The story follows the personal story of Chiyoko Fujiwara, an elderly actress, and gradually becomes a muddle of reality, dreams, and movies. Each episode repeats a series of scenes of "chasing, running, and falling" in different situations and times. Her life, the sum of all of these, also repeats various setbacks and revivals while continuing to chase after Man with Key, who is almost an illusion. This work is a repetition of the same episode, a cyclical story like Boléro in music. Kon said that this idea of a fractal structure owes a lot to the music of Susumu Hirasawa. The story also reflects the hospitalization Kon experienced after his debut as a manga artist, and the frustration and struggle he felt at that time: "Everything is ruined, but can I still make a comeback?" This film is famous for making many audiences feel betrayed by Chiyoko's last line. Kon said that the process of human growth is a repetition of death and rebirth, in which the values we have accumulated up to that point become unacceptable in a new phase, and even if we rebuild them once they are broken, they become unacceptable again in a new phase, and he involved the audience in the fractal of the film by asking them whether they would be able to get up and continue to "chase, run, and fall" even after they "fell" at the end of the film.

Kon said, "'There is no single solution - that's what I want most for my work to be. I want people to see it in many different ways.""

== Critical reception ==
Millennium Actress was favorably received by critics, gaining a 93% "fresh" rating at Rotten Tomatoes. Los Angeles Times critic Kenneth Turan said of the film "as a rumination on the place movies have in our personal and collective subconscious, Millennium Actress fascinatingly goes where films have not often gone before". Kevin M. Williams of the Chicago Tribune gave the movie 4 stars and put his feelings for the film this way: "A piece of cinematic art. It's modern day Japanese animation at its best [...] It's animated, but it's human and will touch the soul of anyone who has loved deeply". In February 2004, Cinefantastique listed the anime as one of the "10 Essential Animations", stating that it "represents a new maturity for anime, one where the technical achievements of 40 years are finally put at the full service of an emotionally rich story."

In 2025, it was one of the films voted for the "Readers' Choice" edition of The New York Times' list of "The 100 Best Movies of the 21st Century," finishing at number 306.

=== Awards ===
Millennium Actress received the Grand Prize in the Japan Agency of Cultural Affairs Media Arts Festival, tying with Spirited Away. Additionally, it won the awards of Best Animation Film and Fantasia Ground-Breaker at the 2001 Fantasia Film Festival. It was awarded the Feature Film Award at the 8th Animation Kobe. The movie took home the prestigious Ofuji Noburo Award at the 2002 Mainichi Film Awards, and was honored with the Orient Express Award at the 2001 Festival de Cine de Sitges in Spain. The film was nominated for four Annie Awards in 2004, including Outstanding Direction and Writing. It was also promoted by its studio as a contender for the 2003 Academy Award for Best Animated Feature, but it was not nominated.
