= Follow Me (Demis Roussos song) =

Single by Demis Roussos

from the album Attitudes
- Released: 1982
- Label: Mercury
- Songwriters: Herbert Kretzmer, Hal Shaper, Joaquín Rodrigo
- Producer: Rainer Pietsch

Demis Roussos singles chronology
"Lost in Love" (1980)	"Follow Me" (1982)	"Island of Love" (1986)

Music video
- "Follow Me" (French TV, 1983) on YouTube

"Follow Me" is a song cover by Greek singer Demis Roussos from his 1982 studio album Attitudes. It was also released as a single (in 1982 on Mercury Records).

== Background and writing ==
The song was written by Herbert Kretzmer, Hal Shaper, and Joaquín Rodrigo. The recording was produced by Rainer Pietsch.

== Commercial performance ==
The song reached no. 27 in the Netherlands and no. 32 in Belgium (Flanders).

== Track listing ==
7" single Mercury 6200 039 (1982, France, Netherlands, Portugal)
7" single Mercury 6000 903 (1982, France, Spain)

A. "Follow Me" (Adagio Movement Of The Concierto De Aranjuez) (5:55)
B. "Song Without End" (4:09)

7" single Polydor DR 2 (1982, UK

A. "Follow Me (Edited Version) (written by Rodrigo/Kretzmer/Shaper)
B. "Lament" (written by Jon Anderson)

== Charts ==
Chart (1982)	Peak position
Belgium (Ultratop 50 Flanders)	32
Netherlands (Single Top 100)	27
