= Bonnie Curtis =

American film producer

- Born: Bonnie Kathleen Curtis; March 26, 1966; Dallas, Texas
- Occupation: Film producer
- Awards: PGA Award, Motion Picture Producer of the Year (1999)

Bonnie Kathleen Curtis (born March 26, 1966) is an American film producer whose credits include Saving Private Ryan, A.I., Minority Report, and The Lost World: Jurassic Park, directed by Steven Spielberg. Her first solo project was the 2005 release The Chumscrubber. She then joined Mockingbird Pictures with partner Julie Lynn in 2011. Curtis and Lynn produced Albert Nobbs, which was nominated for three Academy Awards. Curtis is a co-recipient of the 1999 Producers Guild Award for Motion Picture Producer of the Year, for Saving Private Ryan. On March 12, 2015, Curtis was inducted into the Texas Film Hall of Fame. Spielberg congratulated her via video message during the ceremony.

== Life and career ==
Curtis was born in Dallas, Texas. She is a 1988 graduate of Abilene Christian University, where she majored in journalism after graduating from Dallas Christian High School; she is a member of the university's Sigma Theta Chi women's social club. She received the school's Gutenberg Award "for distinguished professional achievement" in journalism.

Her earliest production work was on the films Arachnophobia and Dead Poets Society. In 1989 Curtis started working with Spielberg, starting as a production assistant in what has turned out to be a 17-year professional relationship.

In her career, she has worked with a variety of actors, including Morgan Freeman, Anthony Hopkins, Matthew McConaughey, Jude Law, Tom Hanks, Matt Damon, Vin Diesel, Tom Cruise, and Colin Farrell.

Her project The Chumscrubber was the subject of an interview granted to The Advocate, in which she discussed the connections she saw between her parents' response to her "coming out" as a lesbian and the disbelieving response of the parents in the film to their children's stories of events and actions in their own lives that seem at odds with their parents' perceptions of them. The interview also discussed her fundraising work with the Gay, Lesbian & Straight Education Network and her appreciation of Spielberg's support, both personally and politically, in the form of such actions as resigning from the national advisory board of the Boy Scouts of America to decry the group's positions on homosexuality.

In 2011, Curtis joined Julie Lynn's Mockingbird Pictures and the two became partners. They have since produced Albert Nobbs, The Face of Love, 5 to 7, and Last Days in the Desert.

In addition to film producing, Curtis is also a well known event speaker. She has spoken at various company retreats, as well as Chicago Ideas Week 2014.

== Filmography ==
She was a producer in all films unless otherwise noted.

=== Film ===
Year	Film	Credit
1997	The Lost World: Jurassic Park	Associate producer
1997	Amistad	Associate producer
1998	Saving Private Ryan	Co-producer
2001	A.I. Artificial Intelligence	
2002	Minority Report	
2005	The Chumscrubber	
2005	Red Eye	Executive producer
2011	Albert Nobbs	
2013	The Face of Love	
2014	5 to 7	
2015	Last Days in the Desert	
2016	The Sweet Life	
2016	Wakefield	
2017	Walking Out	Executive producer
2017	To the Bone	
2017	Life	
2019	Terminator: Dark Fate	Executive producer
2022	Raymond & Ray	
2022	My Father's Dragon	
2023	Heart of Stone	

Miscellaneous crew

Year	Film	Role
1991	Hook	Assistant: Steven Spielberg
1993	Jurassic Park	Assistant: Steven Spielberg
1993	We're Back! A Dinosaur's Story	Assistant: Steven Spielberg
1993	Schindler's List	Production associate
1995	Casper	Assistant: Steven Spielberg

As an actress

Year	Film	Role
2019	Text Messages from the Universe	Dancer

Thanks

Year	Film	Role
2000	Mothman	The producers wish to thank
2021	The Voyeurs	Special thanks

=== Television ===
Year	Title	Credit	Notes
2018	Dietland	Executive producer	
2020	Covid Is No Joke	Executive producer	Television special

Thanks

Year	Title	Role
2011	FutureStates	Thanks
