= Fust (disambiguation) =

Johann Fust was a German printer.

Fust may also refer to:

- Fust (band), American alternative country band
- Fust baronets
- Herbert Fust (1899–1974), German politician
- Herbert Jenner-Fust (1778–1852), English judge and Dean of the Arches
- Herbert Jenner-Fust (cricketer) (1841–1940), English cricketer
- Horst Fust (1930–2003), German newspaper journalist with Bild
- John Fust (ice hockey) (born 1972), Canadian-Swiss ice hockey coach and player
- Meta Fust Willoughby (1887–1937), American composer who used the pseudonym Meta Schumann
- Milan Fust or Milán Füst (1888–1967), Hungarian writer, poet and playwright
- Richard Fust (fl. 1421) of Warnham and Chichester, Sussex, English politician
- Thomas Fust, burnt at the stake for his Protestant beliefs on 30 August 1555
- Walterus le Fust, English Member of Parliament

== See also ==
- Faust
- Faustus (disambiguation)
- Foust
- Fuster
