= Fausto =

Fausto is a given name and surname. It is used as a title for:

== Music ==
- Fausto (opera), an opera by Louise Bertin

== Films ==
- Fausto (1993 film), a French film directed by Rémy Duchemin
- Fausto (2018 film), a Canadian film directed by Andrea Bussmann

== People with the given name ==
- Fausto (footballer, born 1985), or Fausto José Tomás Lúcio, Portuguese footballer
- Fausto Amodei (1934–2025), Italian singer-songwriter
- Fausto Bertinotti (born 1940), Italian politician
- Fausto Budicin (born 1981), Croatian footballer
- Fausto Carmona (born 1980), Dominican baseball player
- Fausto Castilho (1929–2015), Brazilian philosopher
- Fausto Cercignani (born 1941), Italian scholar, essayist and poet
- Fausto Cigliano (1937–2022), Italian singer, guitarist and occasional actor
- Fausto Cleva (1902–1971), Italian-born American operatic conductor
- Fausto Coppi (1919–1960), Italian racing cyclist
- Fausto Correia (1951–2007), Portuguese politician
- Fausto De Amicis (born 1968), Australian football player
- Fausto Bordalo Dias (born 1948), Portuguese musician
- Fausto Elhuyar (1755–1833), Spanish chemist
- Fausto Fanti (1978–2014), Brazilian humorist and guitarist
- Fausto Fawcett (born 1957), Brazilian writer and musician
- Fausto Fernós (born 1972), Puerto Rican podcaster, performance artist and drag performer
- Fausto Ferrari (born 1980), Italian footballer
- Fausto Frigerio (born 1966), Italian hurdler and long jumper
- Fausto Gresini (born 1961), Italian motorcycle racer
- Fausto Íñiguez de Betolaza (1849–1924), Spanish architect
- Fausto Leali (born 1944), Italian singer
- Fausto Mata (born 1971), Dominican comedian and actor
- Fausto Papetti (1923–1999), Italian saxophone player
- Fausto Paravidino (born 1976), Italian dramatist, director, actor and screenwriter
- Fausto Pari (born 1962), Italian footballer
- Fausto Pinto (born 1983), Mexican footballer
- Fausto Pocar (born 1939), Italian jurist
- Fausto Poli (1581–1653), Italian Catholic priest
- Fausto Sozzini (1539–1604), Italian theologian
- Fausto Quinde (born 1976), Ecuadorian race walker
- Fausto Ricci (born 1961), Italian motorcycle racer
- Fausto Romitelli (1963–2004), Italian composer
- Fausto Rossi (singer-songwriter) (born 1954), Italian singer-songwriter
- Fausto Rossi (footballer) (born 1990), Italian footballer
- Fausto Saraceni (1920–2000), Italian film producer
- Fausto dos Santos (1905–1939), Brazilian footballer
- Fausto Silva (born 1950), Brazilian television presenter
- Fausto Sucena Rasga Filho (1929–2007), Brazilian basketball player
- Fausto Tienza (born 1990), Spanish footballer
- Fausto Veranzio (1551–1617), Croatian polymath and bishop
- Fausto Zonaro (1854–1929), Italian painter

== People with the surname ==
- Boris Fausto (1930–2023), Brazilian historian
- Vettor Fausto (1490–1546), Venetian humanist and naval architect

== See also ==
- Di Fausto
- Hurricane Fausto
- Faust (disambiguation)
- Faustus (disambiguation)
