= Faust (disambiguation) =

Faust is the protagonist of a German legend about a magician who makes a pact with the Devil. The character is based on a real person, Johann Georg Faust (c. 1500), but the story is fictional, and modeled largely on ancient sources.

The first version of the Faust legend is the anonymously-authored polemical book, Historia von D. Johann Fausten (1587). This in turn gave rise to the following important dramatic works:

- Doctor Faustus (c. 1592), a play by Christopher Marlowe
- Goethe's Faust (1770-1832), a multipart dramatic poem by Johann Wolfgang von Goethe
- Faust (1859), an opera by Charles Gounod based on Goethe's Faust
- Faust ballets (18th–20th centuries), a number of ballets based on the story of Faust

Faust may also refer to the following:

== Arts and entertainment ==
=== Literature ===
- Faust (1856), a novella by Ivan Turgenev
- Faust (1866), a satirical poem by Estanislao del Campo
- Faust (1980), a novel by Robert Nye
- Faust (magazine) (2003–present), a Japanese literary anthology

=== Classical music and opera ===
- Faust (Spohr) (1816), an opera by Louis Spohr
- Faust Overture (c. 1840), a concert overture by Richard Wagner
- La damnation de Faust (1846), a work for orchestra and chorus by Hector Berlioz
- Faust Symphony (1857), a symphony by Franz Liszt
- Faust (1859, revised 1869), an opera by Charles Gounod
- Doktor Faust (1925), an opera by Ferruccio Busoni

=== Popular music ===
- Faust (band) (1971–present), a German krautrock band
- Faust (album) (1971), an album by the band Faust
- "Faust" (2001), a song by Gorillaz from G-Sides
- "Faust Arp" (2007), a song by Radiohead from In Rainbows
- Bård Guldvik "Faust" Eithun, the former drummer of Norwegian metal band Emperor

=== Theatre ===
- Randy Newman's Faust (1995), a musical by Randy Newman
- Der Faust (2006–present), an annual German theatre prize
- Faust (2012), a play by Edgar Brau
- Faust (EWTC show) (2016), a play by the East West Theatre Company

=== Comics ===
- Faust (manga) (1950), a manga by Osamu Tezuka
- Felix Faust, a character in DC Comics continuity (introduced 1962)
- Faust (comics) (1987–2012), a series of comic books by David Quinn and Tim Vigil
- Faust (comic book), a 2021 comic book by Alexander Pavlenko and Jan Krauß
- Sebastian Faust, a character in DC Comics continuity (introduced 1993)
- Faust VIII, a character in Shaman King (1994–2004, 2021–present manga and anime series)
- Frau Faust (2014–2017), a manga by Kore Yamazaki

=== Film and television ===
- Faust (1926 film), directed by Friedrich Wilhelm Murnau
- Faust (1960 film), directed by Peter Gorski
- Faust (1994 film), directed by Jan Švankmajer
- Faust: Love of the Damned (film) (2000), directed by Brian Yuzna
- Dark Faust, a character in Ultraman Nexus (2004–2005 Japanese TV series)
- Faust, a character in Beyblade: Metal Masters (2010–2011 anime series)
- Faust (2011 film), directed by Alexander Sokurov
- Ilsa Faust, a character in Mission: Impossible – Rogue Nation (2015 film)
- Johnny Faust, a character in American Satan (2017 film) and Paradise City (2021–present TV series)
- The Last Faust (2019 film), directed by Philipp Humm

=== Gaming ===
- Faust, a character in Vendetta (1991 video game)
- Faust (Guilty Gear), a character in Guilty Gear (1998–present video game series)
- Faust (video game) (1999 graphic adventure game)
- Faust, a character in Jazz and Faust (2002 graphic adventure game)
- Faust, a character in Limbus Company (2023-present gacha game)

=== Other media ===
- Faust (paintings) (1976–1979), a series by Nabil Kanso

== Other ==
- Faust (surname), list of people with the surname Faust
- Faust (musician) (born 1974), Norwegian metal drummer
- Faust Lang (1887–1973), German sculptor
- Faust Shkaravsky (1897–1975), Russian army physician and forensic expert
- FAUST (programming language), a purely functional language for signal processing
- MV Faust, a cargo carrier in service 2007–present
- SS Faust, a coaster in service 1920–1926

== Places named after Faust ==
- Faust, Alberta, a hamlet in Canada
- Faust, Missouri, a ghost town
- Faust, North Carolina, an unincorporated community
- Faust, Utah, an unincorporated community

== See also ==
- Works based on Faust
- Fausto (disambiguation)
- Faustus (disambiguation)
- Foust, a surname (including a list of people with the name)
- Deal with the Devil
- Deals with the Devil in popular culture
