= Foutz =

Foutz is a surname. Notable people with the surname include:

- Dave Foutz (1856–1897), American baseball player
- Frank Foutz (1877–1961), American baseball player, brother of Dave

== See also ==
- Foltz
- Fouts
