= Line producer =

Film/TV producer that handles logistics

A line producer is a type of film or television producer who is the head of the production office management personnel during daily operations of a feature film, advertisement film, television film, or TV program. They are responsible for human resources and handling any problems that come up during production. Line producers also manage scheduling and the budget of a motion picture, as well as day-to-day physical aspects of the film production.

== Responsibilities ==
According to Producers Guild of America (PGA) guidelines, the line producer is the individual who reports directly to the individual(s) receiving "Produced by" credit on the theatrical motion picture and is the single individual who has the primary responsibility for the logistics of the production, from pre-production through completion of production; all department heads report to the line producer. A line producer generally works on one episode of a TV series or part of a film.

The line producer functions like a chief operations officer in running the production company. During pre-production, responsibilities include supervising the assembly of the shooting company, recruitment of key personnel and services, and production organization for how to shoot the script and transform it into a movie. The line producer plans start dates for everyone and everything, and monitors the budget in the lead up to picture. Film production generally follows a rigorous schedule. The line producer facilitates location scouting, set building and decorating, offices and stages, wardrobe, props, stunts, physical and visual effects, camera, lighting, rigging, transportation, crew and union relations, travel, cast and crew accommodation, contracting of legal permissions and agreements, safety and risk management, prep and shooting schedule. In short, the line producer oversees the joint planning, negotiations, implementation and accounting for production.

In the studio system, the line producer reports to the studio and typically liaises with key executives of production divisions inside the studio such as physical production, legal, labor relations, insurance, and finance. The line producer supports the director's vision and direct influence on the creative expression or narrative of the film. Although it could be argued that, through a line producer's ability to influence aspects of the film via power of the purse, like allocation of resources to certain departments, they can change important aspects of the film that have creative consequences, e.g., production value. For example, they can affect the project's look by influencing the choice of filming locations. While the director is in charge of all purely artistic decisions, the line producer helps to substantiate the director's creative ideas by taking care of logistics and related issues. From pre-production through principal photography, the line producer oversees the production budget and physical needs of the shoot. By the first day of production, several versions of the budget have usually been drafted. A finalized or "locked" budget is the basis for the production to move forward. A key objective of a line producer is to respect this "locked" budget and deliver in time.

While in production, the line producer oversees the execution of many decisions that must be made to deliver each day's shoot. The administrative aspects, especially those that have any financial impact, are all crucial areas of the line producer's work. These areas include but are not limited to negotiating compensation (usually during pre-production) of crew members (both for union and non-union productions) and resolving daily production issues (in conjunction with the first assistant director and possibly the unit production manager). Moreover, they provide demanded equipment. If required, they handle unanticipated scheduling changes and serve "as a liaison between the crew and the producer."

=== Japanese media ===
In Japanese anime and some films, the terms "animation producer" (アニメーションプロデューサー) and "production producer" (制作プロデューサー) are more commonly used (or variations of them) to represent producers tasked with line producer-like jobs. The work of an animation producer is similar to that of line producers in that both are responsible for managing budget and scheduling logistics with producers in and out of pre-production, as well as management of staff on-site. The animation producer is also responsible for gathering core creative staff with the director and (unlike line producers) in the case of television series works across the series and are often employed by the main animation studio or studios attached to a project. In that context, the staff gathered for a particular series tend to be more representative of the skills and connections of an animation producer than that of the studio as an entity.

The animation producers employed by or associated with a studio can reflect different departments or branch sub-studios. The Girl from the Other Side: Siúil, a Rún is a work generally attributed to Wit Studio; however, the work is a production of Wit's branch studio in Ibaraki Prefecture led by animation producer Kenta Yamada, as opposed to works which can be attributed to Wit's headquarters located in Musashino, Tokyo. Wit Studio itself was founded after a split from Production I.G's sub-studio named Section 6, led by section head George Wada and animation producer Tetsuya Nakatake.

== Notes ==
=== Works cited ===
- Kizawa, Yukito; Takayama, Atsushi; Saitou, Fusano, eds. (2014). 劇場版魔法やまどかマギカ[新編]叛逆の物語公式ガイドブック only you. [Movie Version Puella Magi Madoka Magica [New Edition] Story of Rebellion Official Guidebook only you.]. Houbunsha. ISBN 978-4832244290.
