= The Ancient Magus' Bride =

Japanese dark fantasy shōnen manga

- Cover of the first volume

魔法使いの嫁 (Mahoutsukai no Yome)
- Genre: Dark fantasy; Mystery; Supernatural
- Manga
- Written by: Kore Yamazaki
- Published by: Mag Garden (2013–2023); Bushiroad Works (2023–present)
- English publisher: NA: Seven Seas Entertainment
- Magazine: Monthly Comic Blade; (November 30, 2013 – July 1, 2014); Monthly Comic Garden (September 1, 2014 – March 10, 2023); Comic Growl (December 21, 2023 – present)
- Original run: November 30, 2013 – present
- Volumes: 25
- Original animation DVD

The Ancient Magus' Bride: Those Awaiting a Star
- Directed by: Norihiro Naganuma
- Written by: Kore Yamazaki; Norihiro Naganuma; Aya Takaha
- Music by: Junichi Matsumoto
- Studio: Wit Studio
- Licensed by: Crunchyroll; SEA: Plus Media Networks Asia
- Released: August 13, 2016 (theatrical); September 10, 2016 – September 9, 2017 (DVD)
- Episodes: 3
- Anime television series
- Directed by: Norihiro Naganuma (S1); Kazuaki Terasawa (S2)
- Produced by: Hirotsugu Ose (#1–12); Toshio Iizuka (S1); Masao Itou (S1); George Wada (S1); Naokado Fujiyama (S2); Takeharu Sengoku (S2); Kyouhei Shinfuku (S2)
- Written by: Norihiro Naganuma (S1) (Note: Credited under series composition; Aya Takaha is credited separately under screenplay.); Kazuaki Terasawa (S2) (Note: Credited under series composition; Aya Takaha, Yoko Yonaiyama, and Chiaki Nishinaka are credited separately under screenplay.)
- Music by: Junichi Matsumoto
- Studio: Wit Studio (S1); Studio Kafka (S2)
- Licensed by: Crunchyroll; SEA: Plus Media Networks Asia
- Original network: AT-X, Tokyo MX, MBS, TVA, TVS, CTC, BS11, HBC
- English network: SEA: Aniplus Asia
- Original run: October 7, 2017 – December 21, 2023
- Episodes: 48
- Manga

The Ancient Magus' Bride: Jack Flash and the Faerie Case Files
- Written by: Yū Godai
- Illustrated by: Mako Oikawa
- Published by: Mag Garden
- English publisher: NA: Seven Seas Entertainment
- Imprint: Blade Comics
- Magazine: Manga Doa
- Original run: April 12, 2019 – present
- Volumes: 4
- Manga

The Ancient Magus' Bride: Wizard's Blue
- Written by: Makoto Sanda
- Illustrated by: Isuo Tsukumo
- Published by: Mag Garden
- English publisher: NA: Seven Seas Entertainment
- Imprint: Blade Comics
- Magazine: Manga Doa
- Original run: April 12, 2019 – present
- Volumes: 9
- Original animation DVD

The Ancient Magus' Bride: The Boy from the West and the Knight of the Blue Storm
- Directed by: Kazuaki Terasawa
- Produced by: Naokado Fujiyama; Kyouhei Shinfuku
- Written by: Aya Takaha; Yoko Yonaiyama
- Music by: Junichi Matsumoto
- Studio: Studio Kafka
- Released: September 10, 2021 – September 9, 2022
- Episodes: 3
- icon

The Ancient Magus' Bride (Japanese: 魔法使いの嫁, Hepburn: Mahō Tsukai no Yome) is a Japanese manga series written and illustrated by Kore Yamazaki. It is serialized in Bushiroad Works' Comic Growl manga website and is licensed in North America by Seven Seas Entertainment. Wit Studio produced a three-part prequel original animation DVD (OAD) series which was bundled with volumes of the manga from September 2016 to September 2017 and an anime television series that aired from October 2017 to March 2018. Studio Kafka produced a second three-part OAD series which was bundled with the manga from September 2021 to September 2022, along with the second season of the anime, which aired in two parts from April to July 2023 and October to December of the same year.

== Plot ==
Having been ostracized by both her relatives and partially by society, orphaned Japanese high school student Chise Hatori decides to sell herself at an auction in order for somebody else to take her in and have a new place to call home. At the auction in London, she is sold for five million pounds to Elias Ainsworth, a seven-foot-tall humanoid with an animal skull for a head. The magus, who seems closer to a demon than human, either brings her the light she desperately seeks or drowns her in ever deeper shadows in her new country, Great Britain. The series deals with a romantic slice-of-life storyline in a surreal and supernatural light.

== Characters ==
Chise Hatori (羽鳥智世, Hatori Chise)
Voiced by: Atsumi Tanezaki (Japanese); Dani Chambers (English)
A teenage apprentice and future bride of Elias Ainsworth. Her father took her brother and abandoned the family when she was young, and her mother committed suicide in front of her causing her to feel unwanted by her relatives and bullied by her schoolmates. She sold herself to slavery, in order for someone to take her in. She is sold for five million Pounds to Elias. He tells her she is a Sleigh Beggy, a special magus who can draw magic from her surroundings and from within herself. However, this severely strains their bodies, making Sleigh Beggys very weak, and fated to die prematurely. Hence, Elias bought her with hopes of preventing her early death in about three years. Her small and fragile state has led others to give her the nicknames of Robin, and Little Bird Mage. She frequently receives gifts that suppress her magic to maintain her health. After being taken in by Elias she starts practicing magic, and finds she has a talent for sleep magic, but can also perform any type of magic at the cost of tremendous strain. She is also capable of seeing magical creatures which are normally invisible to people.
Elias Ainsworth (エリアス・エインズワース, Eriasu Einzuwāsu)
Voiced by: Ryōta Takeuchi (Japanese); Brian Mathis (English)
Also known as "Pilum Muralis" (lit. "Wall Spear"), the Child of Thorns, and the Thorn Mage. He is Chise's master and fiancé, once apprenticed to Master Lindenbaum. A being with both fae and human elements, his origins are a mystery. It is hinted that he was born from the shadows of the forest, but his humanlike traits imply he was a mage who dabbled in black magic, consequently losing his humanity and memories. The other faeries see him as an abomination, something he does not mind. Occasionally, he uses glamour spells to hide his animalistic appearance taking on a similar look to people he knows or sees, his true form being that of a tall man with the skull of a sharp-toothed horned beast with glowing red lights in the sockets. He also wears a red veil on the back of his head which he sometimes covers his face with when speaking to others. In the series he first resembles Simon, then Chise, and then an unknown woman. He can summon and control thorns, and transform into shadows. When angry enough, he adopts a more monstrous form consisting of various animal parts, such as a fish tail, wings or a snake body. Lindenbaum calls him a child in regards to Elias' limited understanding and sensations of human emotions. To this end, Elias purchases Chise partially because she is a rare Sleigh Beggy, but also with hope she can teach him about human feelings and behavior. He dislikes children, because they often see through his shadow magic and fear him. The ones that do not fear him ask many questions about him he cannot answer.
Ruth (ルツ, Rutsu)
Voiced by: Koki Uchiyama (Japanese); Austin Tindle (English)
Chise's familiar and a Church grim. He was originally a graveyard guard dog, who chased away grave robbers and evil spirits. He was formerly called Ulysse (ユリシィ, Yurishī) and used to be owned by Isabel. He initially thinks of himself as a human, keeping a human form until he later recalls his true identity. He shares a mental link with Chise and considers her a sister. Ruth's dog form resembles an Irish Wolfdog, although this form can change much like Elias, and he sometimes travels in Chise's shadow.
Silver (シルキー, Shirukī; "Silky")
Voiced by: Aya Endō (Japanese); Rachel Glass (English)
A fairy landlady of the house where Elias and Chise reside. Originally a banshee, she is now a silent silkie and takes care of the housekeeping duties in the household. While protecting Chise, she dislikes Simon Kalm the village priest, glaring at him when he enters Elias' house and wrapping her arms around Chise.
Angelica Varley (アンジェリカ・バーレイ, Anjerika Bārei)
Voiced by: Yūko Kaida (Japanese); Janelle Lutz (English)
An old acquaintance of Elias. She is a mage and a technician of the Magus Craft.
Her father was a technician of the Magus Craft. Even though her father was a magician, Angelica, who only had the quality of a sorcerer, could not directly learn the ways of her father. She worked hard to find her own method of performing magic. She later married, and had a daughter Althea.
Lindenbaum (リンデル, Rinderu; "Lindel")
Voiced by: Daisuke Namikawa (Japanese); Todd Haberkorn (English)
Commonly called Lindel, he is Elias's magician master. He lives in the Land of Dragons. Guarding the last sanctuary of dragons, he is the caretaker of the dragon's nest. His title is Echoes: Song of Flowers, and is many centuries old.
Leanan Sídhe (リャナン・シー, Ryanan Shī)
Voiced by: Saori Hayami (Japanese); Morgan Garrett (English)
A beautiful vampiric faerie who loves men and gives them talent at the cost of dying young. She had strong feelings for an old man named Joel Garland, but denied that they were in love as love would mean his inevitable death. Unfortunately, her presence was already killing him unintentionally at a slow rate. After learning this, Chise created a remedy that allowed them to see each other one last time. After Joel's passing, she tells Chise she will be living in Joel's garden and will not look for more lovers anymore. She later received the name, Redcurrant (レッドカラント Reddokaranto), as Joel and Chise noted her eyes were the same color as the flower in Joel's Garden.
Simon Kalm (サイモン・カラム, Saimon Karamu)
Voiced by: Toshiyuki Morikawa (Japanese); Tyler Carson (English)
A priest of the local church in the English town occupied by Elias and Chise, and was assigned the task of observing Elias. He has a breathing condition that is treated by Elias's medicine.
Mikhail Renfred (ミハイル・レンフレッド, Mihairu Renfureddo)
Voiced by: Satoshi Hino (Japanese); Jarrod Greene (English)
He is an alchemist who apparently hates Magi and magicians, but still cares for his apprentice Alice. He was scarred in the face while protecting Alice, and later allowed Cartaphilus to take his left arm as material for an experiment in place of Alice. He later rebels against Cartaphilus, and becomes interested in finding a way to prevent Chise's premature death.
Alice Swayne (アリス・スウェーン, Arisu Sūēn)
Voiced by: Mutsumi Tamura (Japanese); Jennifer Green (English)
She is Renfred's highly devoted apprentice. A former street urchin, drug abuser and drug seller, Renfred discovered her innate magic potential, and took her in as an apprentice. Despite a few rough meetings with Chise, because of their similar circumstances and having been saved by her, she ends up befriending Chise.
Cartaphilus (カルタフィルス, Karutafirusu; "Cartaphilus")
Voiced by: Ayumu Murase (Japanese); Jessie James Grelle (English)
His true identity is "Cartaphilus", but prefers the name Joseph (ヨセフ, Yosefu) after the young gravedigger he fused with. He is known also as the Wandering Jew, or the "Magician of the Flow". He is a mysterious being that looks like a young boy, but has been around longer than even Elias. He is so old that he even refers to Ainsworth as a "little boy". Long ago, people said that "God's Son" cast an immortal curse on him for mocking him during the crucifixion, (much like Gestas); it's said his immortality will last until Judgement Day. Through this curse he is unable to die, yet his body continuously rots causing perpetual pain and suffering. While he appears mostly human, he uses the body parts of other creatures and often collects fresh pieces for his body. He travels around the world performing gruesome experiments on both living and dead creatures as well as both humans and fae in hopes of creating a body that will not decay or will give him the ability to finally die. He has persisted for so long at this that he has forgotten why he does experiments causing him to bring nothing but suffering and carnage. His one true desire is to be forgiven and live without suffering.
Joseph (ヨセフ, Yosefu)
A kind boy rumored to be the son of a witch. He is in charge of digging graves at the village. The villagers disliked him, calling him strange and creepy because of his ability to see fae and speak with the dead. One day, he hears a voice calling for help. He follows the voice and finds Cartaphilus (voiced by Jerry Jewell), who looks like a shriveled up corpse. He brings Cartaphilus to his house and attempts to nurse him back to health. Cartaphilus makes Joseph feel needed causing Joseph to grow attached and he asks Cartaphilus to take him away once he is healed. Upon learning Cartaphilus cannot be cured in order to take him away to a better place, a strange fusion is made between the two giving Cartaphilus Joseph's body in order to take him away from his misery. After the fusion however, both enter a state of temporary amnesia. This fusion does not stop the curse from slowly consuming both of them, rotting them from the inside out. Joseph then regains some memory after hearing about Cartaphilus' past. He gets angry for suffering for something he did not do and Cartaphilus forgets what he did.
Oberon (オベロン, Oberon)
Voiced by: Kappei Yamaguchi (Japanese); Joel McDonald (English)
A mischievous Faerie King and Titania's husband. He resembles a satyr, with hooves and deer antlers.
Titania (ティターニア, Titānia)
Voiced by: Sayaka Ohara (Japanese); Colleen Clinkenbeard (English)
The Faerie Queen and Oberon's wife. She looks like a beautiful woman riding a donkey, but can temporarily possess other faeries. She is a proud and very kind motherly figure to Ainsworth and frequently requests he come to live with her in the faerie kingdom. She still considers Ainsworth her child as he is the shadow of nature even though he is mostly a beast. Despite repeated requests from Ainsworth not to, she feels sorry for him and wishes for his happiness because she knows he is not accepted by humans or fae and may very well never find a place in the world.
Spriggan (スプリガン, Supurigan)
Voiced by: Hiroki Yasumoto (Japanese); Chris Ryan (English)
Titania and Oberon's bodyguard, who dislikes Elias. He gave Silver a new purpose and name after finding her weeping in the ruins of the house of the family she cried for as a banshee.
Rahab (ラハブ, Rahabu)
Voiced by: Kotono Mitsuishi (Japanese); Lydia Mackay (English)
Introduced by Lindel as his master and teacher. She is older than Lindel and is the person that gave both Lindel and Elias their names. She lives on an island that drifts through time and space.
Stella Barklem (ステラ・バークレム, Sutera Bākuremu)
Voiced by: Sumire Morohoshi (Japanese); Skyler Mclntosh (English)
A friend of Chise and the older sister of Ethan. While visiting her grandparents over Christmas she got into an argument with Ethan, in which afterwards, he goes to the woods. Stella frantically went around town looking for him, but she couldn't find him and strangely everybody but her forgot he existed. Then she ran into Chise and Elias, telling them what happened and begging for their help. They agreed to help, then found out that it was Ashen Eye that took Stella's brother. Once they saved Ethan, Stella repays Chise and Elias by baking sweets for them when she makes her monthly visit to her grandparents.
Riichi Miura (三浦 理一, Miura Riichi)
Voiced by: Takahiro Sakurai
A librarian friend of Chise appeared in The Ancient Magus' Bride: Those Awaiting a Star OVA.
Ashen Eye (灰の目, Hai no Me)
Voiced by: Jouji Nakata (Japanese); Greg Dulcie (English)
An ancient fae who gives Chise a magical fox skin that she can use to mutate into a were-animal of her choosing. Ashen Eye is spiteful towards humans to the point he will use them to amuse himself.
Mariel (マリエル, Marieru)
Voiced by: Maaya Sakamoto (Japanese); Jamie Marchi (English)
At first, Chise is the only one who sees or hears Mariel at Seth's auction house. Mariel later appears before Elias and Chise, revealing she's a witch, and that she may have a solution to Chise's curse.
Yuuki Hatori (羽鳥 夕輝, Hatori Yuuki)
Voiced by: Shinji Kawada (Japanese); Kyle Phillips (English)
Chise's father. Back in Japan, he kept their neighbors from spying on them until he and his youngest son Fumiki ran away together, leaving Chise and her mother to fend for themselves.
Chika Hatori (羽鳥 智花, Hatori Chika)
Voiced by: Kikuko Inoue (Japanese); Rachel Michelle Thompson (English)
Chise and Fumiki's late mother. Originally before her death, she was kind, loving and soft-spoken; she tried protecting her daughter from the creatures that were drawn to her--but after a while, she grew to hate her own daughter. The stress of having to care for Chise tore her apart and she decided to end her own life by killing herself in front of Chise. It is implied that in the past, Chise's mother had gone through similar things when she was younger but was able to persevere. The stress of dealing with it again alongside raising Chise was what made her susceptible to her manipulation and near strangulation of her daughter. It is through her that Chise inherited the red hair and green eyes.
Fumiki Hatori (羽鳥 史輝, Hatori Fumiki)
Voiced by: Hana Satō (Japanese); Katelyn Barr (English)
Chise's younger brother who mysteriously disappeared with his father. Like the rest of his family, he has incredible magical energy that in the same vein as his father created a protective barrier at the family apartment to keep the neighbors away.
Akiko Hatori (羽鳥 亜紀子, Hatori Akiko)
Voiced by: Aya Hisakawa (Japanese); Linda Leonard (English)
Chise's distant aunt through marriage, her husband Shouji forced her to take her in to avoid having a negative reputation and raised her along her two sons Daiki and Koki. However, Akiko was heavily negligent of Chise and was constantly complaining to her husband due to his business trips, leaving him to not deal with the young mage-to-be. Like most humans, Akiko could not see the "neighbors", and thus did not know the torment that Chise went through on a daily basis, instead seeing her as a problem child and a burden.
Shouji Hatori (羽鳥 昭次, Hatori Shōji)
Voiced by: Makoto Yasumura (Japanese); Kris Bryan (English)
Akiko's husband, Daiki & Koki's father and Chise's uncle. He's often away on business trips.
Daiki Hatori (羽鳥 大輝, Hatori Daiki)
Voiced by: Ami Naitō
Shouji and Akiko's first son, Koki's brother and one of Chise's cousins.
Koki Hatori (羽鳥 幸輝, Hatori Kōki)
Voiced by: Natsumi Fujiwara
Shouji and Akiko's second son, Daiki's brother and one of Chise's cousins.
Lucy Webster (ルーシー・ウェブスター, Rūshī Uebusutā)
Voiced by: Minami Tsuda (Japanese); Sarah Roach (English)
Chise's roommate at the College. The heir to the Webster family, she seeks to discover why her family was murdered and their spiders stolen.
Philomela Sergeant (フィロメラ・サージェント, Firomera Sājento)
Voiced by: Maki Kawase
One of Chise's classmates at the College. She is the companion of Veronica Rickenbacker, and has the ability to erase her physical presence.
Rían Scrimgeour (リアン・スクリム=ジョー, Rian Sukurimujō)
Voiced by: Seiichiro Yamashita (Japanese); Ricco Fajardo (English)
One of Chise's classmates at the College. A member of House Scrimgeour of the Seven Shields, he rejects his bloodline as a member of the House and seeks his own path in life.
Zoe Ivy (ゾーイ・アイビー, Zōi Aibī)
Voiced by: Daiki Kobayashi
One of Chise's classmates at the College. A half-gorgon, half-human who has difficulty controlling his snake hair and evil eye.
Veronica Rickenbacker (ヴェロニカ・リッケンバッカー, Vueronika Rikkenbakkā)
Voiced by: Reina Ueda (Japanese); Alexis Tipton (English)
One of the college students.
Isaac Fowler (アイザック・ファウラー, Aizakku Faurā)
Voiced by: Koutaro Nishiyama (Japanese); Derick Snow (English), Bryson Baugus (Cour Two)
One of Chise's classmates at the College.
Violet St. George (ヴァイオレット・セント=ジョージ, Vuaioretto Sento Jōji)
Voiced by: Daiki Yamashita
Jasmine's brother.
Jasmine St. George (ジャスミン・セント=ジョージ, Jasumin Sento Jōji)
Voiced by: Minami Tanaka (Japanese); Marisa Duran (English)
Violet's sister.
April Atwood (エイプリル・アウトウッド, Eipuriru Autouddo)
Voiced by: Mari Uchiyama (Japanese); Lindsay Seidel, Kelsey Maher (Cour Two) (English)
May Atwood (メイ・アウトウッド, Mei Autouddo)
Voiced by: Miki Natsutani (Japanese); Brittney Karbowski (English)
Sofia Healey (ソフィア・ヒーリー)
Voiced by: Mayumi Tsukishima (Japanese); Mallorie Rodak (English)
Beatrice Byrne (ベアトリス・バーン)
Voiced by: Hana Sato (Japanese); Megan Shipman (English)
Lazarus McGovern (ラザラス・マクガヴァン)
Voiced by: Takumi Takiguchi (Japanese); Ben Balmaceda, Grant Paulsen (Cour Two) (English)}}
Kevin Forbes (ケヴィン・フォーブス)
Voiced by: Shuichi Uchida (Japanese); Clifford Chapin (English)
Roy Truman (ロイ・トルーマン)
Voiced by: Seiyu Fujiwara (Japanese); Philip Annarella (English)
Martin Chandler (マーティン・チャンドラー)
Voiced by: Kōsuke Ōnishi (Japanese); Davon Oliver (English)
Narcisse Maugham (ナルシス・モーム, Narushisu Mōmu)
Voiced by: Kohsuke Toriumi (Japanese); David Matranga (English)
Liza Quillyn (ライザ・クウィライン, Raiza Kūirain)
Voiced by: Mami Koyama (Japanese); Linda Leonard (English)
Lizbeth Sargant (リズベス・サージェント, Rizubesu Sājento)
Voiced by: Sayuri Sadaoka
Philomela's abusive grandmother.
Fabio Zaccheroni (ファービーオー・ザカーロニー, Fabioh Jakaronii)
Voiced by: Makoto Furukawa (Japanese); Alejandro Saab (English)
Sigrid Wachmann (ヴァハマン)
Voiced by: Shoko Yuzuki (Japanese); Erin Kelly Noble, Jessica Peterson (English)
Alcyone (アルキュオネ)
Voiced by: Sayaka Kinoshita (Japanese); Corey Pettit (English)
Philomela's guardian and an artificial spirit. Created by her father to protect her.

== Media ==
=== Manga ===
The Ancient Magus' Bride is written and illustrated by Kore Yamazaki. The series was first serialized in Mag Garden's Monthly Comic Blade from November 30, 2013, to September 1, 2014, when the magazine ceased publication. The series was moved to the new Monthly Comic Garden magazine, while also continuing to be released on the Monthly Comic Blade website. In March 2023, the series went on hiatus. The series resumed serialization on Bushiroad Works' Comic Growl manga website on December 21, 2023.

Seven Seas Entertainment licensed the series for publication in North America in October 2014.

A drama CD was bundled with the limited edition of the fifth volume, released in March 2016.

Some copies of the English volume 8 were printed with black and white covers instead of color.

The series has been collected into twenty-five tankōbon volumes, with twenty-two being published in English as of July 28, 2026.

Two spin-off manga with supervision by Yamazaki were launched on the Manga Doa app on April 12, 2019. The first manga, titled The Ancient Magus' Bride: Jack Flash and the Faerie Case Files, is written by Yū Godai and illustrated by Mako Oikawa, while the second manga, titled The Ancient Magus' Bride: Wizard's Blue, is written by Makoto Sanda and illustrated by Isuo Tsukumo. Both spin-off manga are also licensed by Seven Seas Entertainment.

No.	Original release date	Original ISBN	English release date	English ISBN
1	April 10, 2014	978-4-8000-0284-6	May 12, 2015	978-1-626921-87-0
1. "April showers bring May flowers." (4月の雨は5月の花を咲かす。, 4 gatsu no ame wa 5 gatsu no hana o sakasu.); 2. "One today is worth two tomorrows." (今日は明日2つ分の価値がある。, Kyō wa ashita 2tsu-bun no kachigāru.); 3. "The scale distinguishes not between gold and lead." (天秤は金も鉛も区別しない。, Tenbin wa kin mo namari mo kubetsu shinai.); 4. "Everything must have a beginning." (すべてには始まりがある。, Subete ni wa hajimari ga aru.); 5. "Misfortunes seldom come singly." (不幸は繰り返し訪れる。, Fukō wa kurikaeshi otozureru.)
2	September 10, 2014	978-4-8000-0361-4	September 1, 2015	978-1-626921-92-4
6. "Curiosity killed the cat." (好奇心は猫を殺す。, Kōkishin wa neko o korosu.); 7. "Love conquers all." (愛は全てに勝る。, Ai wa subete ni masaru.); 8. "The Faerie Queene." (妖精の女王, Yōsei no joō); 9. "When one door closes, another opens." (1つの扉が閉まると別の扉が開く。, 1Tsu no tobira ga shimaru to betsu no tobira ga hiraku.); 10. "Speak of the devil, and he is sure to appear." (噂をすれば影が差す。, Uwasawosurebakagegasasu.)
3	March 10, 2015	978-4-8000-0422-2; ISBN 978-4-8000-0420-8 (LE)	December 1, 2015	978-1-626922-24-2
11. "Seeing is believing." (百聞は一見に如かず。, Hyakubun wa ikken ni shikazu.); 12. "Let sleeping dogs lie." (寝た犬は起こしてはいけない。, Neta inu wa okoshite wa ikenai.); 13. "None so deaf as those who will not hear." (聞こうとしない者ほど説得が困難である。, Kikou to shinai mono hodo settoku ga kon'nandearuu); 14. "Little pitchers have long ears." (小さな水差しには大きな取っ手がある。, Chīsana mizusashi ni wa ōkina totte ga aru.); 15. "We live and learn." (長生きはするものだ。, Nagaiki wa suru monoda)
4	September 10, 2015	978-4-8000-0498-7; ISBN 978-4-8000-0484-0 (LE)	April 12, 2016	978-1-626922-55-6
16. "Once bitten, twice shy" (一度噛まれると、二度目は臆病になる。, Ichido kama reru to, futatabime wa okubyō ni naru); 17. "Lovers ever run before the clock." (恋人たちはいつも時計の前を走る。, Koibito-tachi wa itsumo tokei o mae ni hashiru); 18. "Better to ask the way than go astray." (聞くは一時の恥。聞かぬは一生の恥。, Kiku wa ichiji no haji. Kikanu wa isshō no haji.); 19. "It is a long lane that has no turning." (曲がり角のない道はない。, Magarikado no nai michi wanai); 20. "East, west, home's best." (やはり我が家が一番良い。, Yahari wagaya ga ichiban'ii)
5	March 10, 2016	978-4-8000-0547-2; ISBN 978-4-8000-0510-6 (LE)	July 5, 2016	978-1-626922-84-6
21. "Looks breed love." (一目惚れ。, Hitomebore); 22. "A Contented mind is a perpetual feast." (満足した心は永遠の祝宴。, Manzoku shita kokoro wa eien no shukuen.); 23. "Fools rush in where angels fear to tread." (愚者は天使が恐れる場所に飛び込む。, Gusha wa tenshi ga osoreru basho ni tobikomu); 24. "There is no place like home." (我が家に勝るものはない。, Wagaya ni masaru mono wa nai.); 25. "The longest day has an end." (どんな長い日も、終わりがある。, Don'na nagai hi mo, owari ga aru)
6	September 10, 2016	978-4-8000-0611-0	January 3, 2017	978-1-626923-50-8
26. "God's mill grinds slow but sure." (神の臼はゆっくりと確実に粉を挽く。, Kami no usu wa yukkuri to kakujitsu ni kona o hiku); 27. "God's mill grinds slow but sure.II" (神の臼はゆっくりと確実に粉を挽く。, 2 Kami no usu wa yukkuri to kakujitsu ni kona o hiku II); 28. "Look before you leap." (飛ぶ前によく見よ。, Tobu mae ni yoku miyo); 29. "Look before you leap.II" (飛ぶ前によく見よ。, 2 Tobu mae ni yoku miyo II); 30. "Zeal without knowledge is a runaway horse." (知識のない熱意は暴れ馬同然。, Chishiki no nai netsui wa abare-ba-dōzen)
7	March 10, 2017	978-4-8000-0658-5	July 4, 2017	978-1-626924-99-4
31. "Forgive and forget." 32. "Examples are better than precept." 33. "Any port in a storm.I"; 34. "Any port in a storm.II"; 35. "Any port in a storm.III"
8	September 9, 2017	978-4-8000-0567-0	February 27, 2018	978-1-626925-97-7
36. "You can't make an omelet without breaking a few eggs." 37. "You can't make an omelet without breaking a few eggs.II"; 38. "The darkest hour is that before the dawn."; 39. "Necessity has no law." 40. "What is bred in the bone will not out of the flesh."
9	March 24, 2018	978-4-8000-0747-6; ISBN 978-4-8000-0727-8 (LE)	September 11, 2018	978-1-626928-01-5
41. "As you sow, so shall you reap." 42. "It is the first step that is troublesome." 43. "The road to Hell is paved with good intentions."; 44. "Nothing seek, nothing find." 45. "Live and let live."
10	September 10, 2018	978-4-8000-0794-0; ISBN 978-4-8000-0785-8 (LE)	February 26, 2019	978-1-626929-90-6
46. "Birds of a feather flock together.I"; 47. "Birds of a feather flock together.II"; 48. "Birds of a feather flock together.III"; 49. "Birds of a feather flock together.IV"; 50. "The cowl does not make the monk.I"
11	March 9, 2019	978-4-8000-0837-4	September 24, 2019	978-1-642751-01-7
51. "The cowl does not make the monk. II"; 52. "The cowl does not make the monk. III"; 53. "First impressions are the most lasting. I"; 54. "First impressions are the most lasting. II"; 55. "First impressions are the most lasting. III"
12	September 10, 2019	978-4-8000-0890-9	February 25, 2020	978-1-64505-201-2
56. "Better bend than break. I"; 57. "Better bend than break. II"; 58. "Better bend than break. III"; 59. "Slow and sure. I"; 60. "Slow and sure. II"
13	March 10, 2020	978-4-8000-0945-6	October 13, 2020	978-1-64505-470-2
61. "Slow and sure. III"; 62. "Conscience does make cowards of us all. I"; 63. "Conscience does make cowards of us all. II"; 64. "Conscience does make cowards of us all. III"; 65. "Conscience does make cowards of us all. IV"
14	September 10, 2020	978-4-8000-0967-8	April 27, 2021	978-1-64505-805-2
66. "A Small Leak Will Sink A Great Ship. I"; 67. "A Small Leak Will Sink A Great Ship. II"; 68. "A Small Leak Will Sink A Great Ship. III"; 69. "A Small Leak Will Sink A Great Ship. IV"; 70. "A Small Leak Will Sink A Great Ship. V"
15	March 10, 2021	978-4-8000-1055-1	October 5, 2021	978-1-64827-272-1
71. "Nothing venture, nothing have. I"; 72. "Nothing venture, nothing have. II"; 73. "Nothing venture, nothing have. III"; 74. "Nothing venture, nothing have. IV"; 75. "Needs must when the devil drives. I"
16	September 10, 2021	978-4-8000-1128-2	October 25, 2022	978-1-63858-294-6
76. "Needs must when the devil drives. II"; 77. "Gather ye rosebuds while ye may. I"; 78. "Gather ye rosebuds while ye may. II"; 79. "Coming events cast their shadows before. I"; 80. "Coming events cast their shadows before. II"
17	March 10, 2022	978-4-8000-1183-1	March 7, 2023	978-1-63858-841-2
81. "Coming events cast their shadows before. III"; 82. "Man's extremity is God's opportunity. I"; 83. "Man's extremity is God's opportunity. II"; 84. "Even a worm will turn. I"; 85. "Even a worm will turn. II"
18	September 9, 2022	978-4-8000-1240-1	July 4, 2023	978-1-68579-577-1
86. "A burnt child dreads the fire. I"; 87. "A burnt child dreads the fire. II"; 88. "Give a thief enough rope and he'll hang himself. I"; 89. "Give a thief enough rope and he'll hang himself. II"; 90. "Of two evils choose the less.I"
19	March 10, 2023	978-4-8000-1302-6	December 12, 2023	979-8-88843-052-1
91. "Of two evils choose the less. II"; 92. "Keep the pot boiling. I"; 93. "Keep the pot boiling. II"; 94. "Keep the pot boiling. III"; 95. "The show must go on. I"
20	April 12, 2024	978-4-0489-9608-2	July 1, 2025	979-8-88843-800-8
96. "The show must go on. II"; 97. "The show must go on. III"; 98. "Fish and guests stink after three."; 99. "Many a little makes a mickle." 100. "Kindness will creep where it cannot go."
21	October 8, 2024	978-4-0489-9639-6	October 28, 2025	979-8-89561-110-4
101. "Rain before seven, fine before eleven. I"; 102. "Rain before seven, fine before eleven. II"; 103. "Big fleas have little fleas. I"; 104. "Big fleas have little fleas. II"; 105. "Big fleas have little fleas. III"
22	April 8, 2025	978-4-04-899671-6	July 28, 2026	979-8-89561-718-2
106. "misery makes strange bedfellows." 107. "misery makes strange bedfellows. II"; 108. "First catch your hare."
23	October 8, 2025	978-4-04-899772-0	December 22, 2026	979-8-89765-364-5
111. "Time will tell. III"; 112. "Today you, tomorrow me. I"; 113. "Today you, tomorrow me. II"; 114. "Tomorrow never comes. I"; 115. "Tomorrow never comes. II"
24	April 8, 2026	978-4-04-899799-7	April 27, 2027	979-8-89863-093-5
116. "Tomorrow never comes. III"; 117. "One hand washes the other." 118. "You can take a horse to the water, but you can't make him drink." 119. "You can take a horse to the water, but you can't make him drink. II"; 120. "You can take a horse to the water, but you can't make him drink. III"
25	October 8, 2026	978-4-04-921146-7	—	—
121. "Every cloud has a silver lining." 122. "Every cloud has a silver lining." 123. "Two heads are better than one. I"; 124. "Two heads are better than one. II"

=== Light novels ===
No.	Title	Original release date	English release date
1	The Ancient Magus' Bride: The Golden Yarn; Mahōtsukai no Yome Kinshi-hen (魔法使いの嫁 金糸篇)	September 8, 2017; 978-4-8000-0690-5	December 11, 2018; 978-1-626929-75-3
2	The Ancient Magus' Bride: The Silver Yarn; Mahōtsukai no Yome Ginshi-hen (魔法使いの嫁 銀糸篇)	October 10, 2017; 978-4-8000-0692-9	March 19, 2019; 978-1-642750-01-0

=== Anime ===
A three-part prequel original animation DVD (OAD) series was announced in the fifth volume of the manga. The prequel series is titled The Ancient Magus' Bride: Those Awaiting a Star (魔法使いの嫁 星待つひと, Mahō Tsukai no Yome: Hoshi Matsu Hito). It is directed by Norihiro Naganuma and written by Kore Yamazaki, with scripts by Aya Takaha. Wit Studio produced the animation and Production I.G is credited with planning and production. Hirotaka Katō designed the characters and Bamboo is in charge of the background art. The series' music is composed by Junichi Matsumoto and produced by Flying Dog.

The episodes were bundled with the sixth, seventh and eighth volumes of the manga, between September 10, 2016, March 10, 2017, and September 9, 2017. The first episode was shown in theaters for two weeks, starting on August 13, 2016; the second episode premiered in theaters on February 4, 2017; and the third episode premiered on August 19, 2017. Crunchyroll began streaming the first episode on September 10, 2016.

An anime television series adaptation was announced in March 2017, and aired from October 7, 2017, to March 24, 2018, on MBS, Tokyo MX, BS11 and other Japanese channels. Junna performed the opening theme "Here", and Hana Itoki performed the ending theme "Wa –cycle-" (環-cycle-). The second opening theme is "You" by May'n, and the ending theme is "Tsuki no Mō Hanbun" (月のもう半分, The Moon is Already a Half Moon) by Aiki & Akino from bless4. The anime adapted the manga till the ninth volume. It later won the best drama award at the 2017 Crunchyroll Anime Awards. Crunchyroll streamed the series worldwide except for Japan, China, Taiwan, Hong Kong and Macau. Funimation streamed an English dub on their website and distributed the series on home video in North America. Manga Entertainment distributed the series on home video in the United Kingdom and Ireland.

A second three-part OAD series titled The Ancient Magus' Bride: The Boy from the West and the Knight of the Blue Storm (魔法使いの嫁 西の少年と青嵐の騎士, Mahō Tsukai no Yome: Nishi no Shōnen to Seiran no Kishi) was announced in March 2021, with the episodes being bundled with the sixteenth, seventeenth and eighteenth volumes of the manga, released on September 10, 2021, March 10, 2022, and September 9, 2022. The OAD series is animated by Studio Kafka and directed by Kazuaki Terasawa, with scripts by Aya Takaha and Yoko Yonaiyama. Hirotaka Katō returns to design the characters, and Junichi Matsumoto returns to compose the series' music.

A second season was announced on September 5, 2022. Studio Kafka returned from the second OAD series to produce the season, with Kazuaki Terasawa returning to direct. Chiaki Nishinaka is joining Aya Takaha and Yoko Yonaiyama in writing the screenplay. Hirotaka Katō and Junichi Matsumoto are also returning as character designer and composer. The first cour aired from April 6 to June 22, 2023, while the second cour aired from October 5 to December 21 of the same year on Tokyo MX, BS11, Sun TV, and AT-X. For the first cour, the opening theme is "Dear" performed by Junna, while the ending theme is "Mubansou" (無伴奏) performed by edda. The second cour premiered on October 5, 2023. For the second cour, the opening theme is "Nemurasareta Lineage" (眠らされたリネージュ) performed by Junna, while the ending theme is "fam" performed by Yuyu.

=== Stage play ===
A stage play at the Owlspot Theater in Tokyo ran from October 5–14, 2019. It featured scripts by Aya Takaha and performances by Haruka Kudō and Naotaka Kamino as Chise Hatori and Elias Ainsworth respectively.

== Reception ==
=== Sales ===
Volume 2 reached the ninth place on the Oricon's weekly manga chart and, by September 21, 2014, had sold 104,518 copies.

The series had sold half a million copies by June 2015, 2.5 million copies by March 2016, and over three million as of September 2016. By December 2017, the series had five million copies in print.

Volume two appeared on The New York Times manga bestsellers list for four weeks, rising to third place for two. Volume three debuted on the list at second place, volume four debuted at first place, and volume five debuted at fourth place.

=== Critical reception ===
Reviewing the first volume for Anime News Network, Nick Creamer gave it a grade of A−. He praised the series' art, noting that it "does great work in impressing upon the audience the same sense of wonder Chise experiences throughout. The character designs are expressive and backgrounds ornate". Commenting on the relationship between Chise and Elias, he wrote that "having this story go in a legitimately romantic direction would likely raise thorny issues of power dynamics and consent", but remarked that, as it was, the story "does a commendable job of making both Chise and Elias understandable and likable characters". He concluded his review by writing: "What conflict all these lovely details might be leading towards is a mystery so far, but the execution is so strong that I'm ready to follow wherever it leads." In his review of the second volume, he admitted to coming to an appreciation of the main characters' relationship, writing that "the ambiguities of their relationship actually seem like one more fitting piece of a world where every relationship is ambiguous". He called the series' magic "classic but still refreshing". He also commented that the series' art "remains gorgeous and well-suited to the story all throughout this volume ... the backgrounds are lush and faces expressive, and the whole style has an ornate looseness to it that works perfectly for this kind of fantasy storytelling". He concluded by saying "If you have any appreciation for this style of classic fantasy storytelling, Ancient Magus' Bride is a can't-miss production".

=== Accolades ===
The Ancient Magus' Bride ranked second on Takarajimasha's Kono Manga ga Sugoi! list of best manga of 2014 for male readers. The series ranked 36th on the 2014 "Book of the Year" list by the Da Vinci magazine. Da Vinci readers also ranked it second in a poll to determine the series most likely to "make their big break" in 2015. The series ranked first on a poll of 2,360 bookstore employees to determine the 2015's top 15 manga series published in five volumes or less. It was one of fourteen titles nominated for the eighth Manga Taishō awards in 2015. The series ranked second in the first Next Manga Award in the print manga category.
