= Fout =

Fout is a surname. Notable people with the surname include:

- Alison R. Fout, American inorganic chemist
- Frederick William Fout (1839 or 1840–1905), German-born Union Army officer in the American Civil War awarded the Medal of Honor
- Henry Harness Fout (1861–1947), American author and missionary
- Nina Fout (born 1959), American equestrian in the 2000 Olympics

== See also ==
- Fouts, another surname
