= The One Piece =

Upcoming Japanese original net animation series

- Genre: Adventure; Fantasy comedy
- Based on: One Piece by Eiichiro Oda
- Screenplay by: Taku Kishimoto
- Directed by: Masashi Koizuka
- Country of origin: Japan
- Original language: Japanese
- No. of episodes: 7

Production
- Animator: Wit Studio
- Production companies: Shueisha; Toei Animation; Fuji Television; Wit Studio; Netflix

Original release
- Network: Netflix

The One Piece (stylized in all caps) is an upcoming Japanese original net animation (ONA) series directed by Masashi Koizuka and produced by Wit Studio. It is the second anime series that adapts the manga One Piece by Eiichiro Oda, after the 1999 television series produced by Toei Animation. It is set to be released on Netflix in February 2027.

== Premise ==
The One Piece follows Monkey D. Luffy, an aspiring pirate who sets sail with his Straw Hats crew in search of the mysterious legendary One Piece treasure.

== Characters ==
Monkey D. Luffy (モンキー・D・ルフィ, Monkī Dī Rufi)
Voiced by: Mayumi Tanaka
A 17-year-old boy with the ability to stretch like rubber, who sets sail to form a pirate crew and find the One Piece, the legendary treasure that can make him the next King of the Pirates.

Roronoa Zoro (ロロノア・ゾロ)
A 19-year-old skilled swordsman who fights using three swords, aiming to become the world's greatest swordsman. He used to hunt pirates until Luffy recruited him for his crew.

Nami (ナミ)
A 18-year-old girl who is dedicated to theft treasures and who, despite hating pirates, ends up joining Luffy on his journey.

Usopp (ウソップ, Usoppu)
A 17-year-old boy with great aim, known for his lies in his hometown, and who joins Luffy to become a sea's brave warrior like his father Yasopp.

== Production and release ==
At Jump Festa 2024, it was announced that Wit Studio was working on new anime of One Piece for Netflix. It was subsequently announced to be directed by Masashi Koizuka, with character designs by Kyoji Asano and Takatoshi Honda and screenplays by Taku Kishimoto. The first seven-episode season, which adapts the first 50 chapters of the manga, will be released on Netflix in February 2027.

On June 24, 2026, Netflix released an official teaser showcasing the series. In August 2026, Wit Studio president George Wada clarified that the anime was not a remake of the 1999 anime adaptation, but a reboot which takes the One Piece manga as its basis.
