= Nordmark (disambiguation) =

Nordmark can mean:

- Nordmark Hundred - a district of Värmland in Sweden
- the German name for the Northern March - a territorial organisation in the Holy Roman Empire
- Arbeitserziehungslager Nordmark a work camp from the Nazis
- Kriegsmarine Nordmark - a vessel in the German Kriegsmarine of the Dithmarschen class
- SS Nordmark, a coaster in service 1926-36
- Nordmarka, the Norwegian name for the North Mark which makes up the northern part of Oslo, Norway
