= Fausto Rossi =

Fausto Rossi may refer to:

- Fausto Rossi (singer-songwriter) (born 1954), Italian singer-songwriter
- Fausto Rossi (footballer) (born 1990), Italian footballer
