= Doctor Faustus =

Doctor Faustus may refer to:

- Faust, a legendary and fictional character
- Johann Georg Faust (c. 1480 or 1466–c. 1541), German alchemist, astrologer, and magician
- Doctor Faustus (play), also known as The Tragical History of the Life and Death of Doctor Faustus, a 1592 play by Christopher Marlowe
- Doktor Faust, a 1925 opera by Ferruccio Busoni
- Doctor Faustus (novel), a 1947 novel by Thomas Mann
- Doctor Faustus (1967 film), a 1967 British film directed by Richard Burton and Nevill Coghill
- Doctor Faustus (character), a Marvel Comics character
- Doctor Faustus (1982 film), a 1982 West German film directed by Franz Seitz
- Dr Faustus, an English folk music band that preceded Faustus
- Dr Faust, a playable and reoccurring fighter in Guilty Gear
- Doctor Faustus (2021 film), a 2021 British film directed by Mariana Lewis

== See also ==
- Faustus (disambiguation)
