= Faust and Marguerite =

Faust and Marguerite may refer to:

- Faust and Marguerite (opera), an opera
- Faust and Marguerite (1900 film), directed by Edwin S. Porter
- Faust and Marguerite (1904 film), or Faust et Marguerite, directed by Georges Méliès
- Faust and Marguerite (1911 film), or Faust et Marguerite, starring Gaston Modot

== See also ==
- Faust (disambiguation)
- Marguerite (disambiguation)
