= The Grimm Variations =

Japanese streaming television series

- Key visual / promotional poster

グリム組曲 (Gurimu Kumikyoku)
- Genre: Anthology
- Original net animation
- Directed by: Yōko Kanamori; Yasuhiro Akamatsu; Jun'ichirō Hashiguchi; Yumi Kamamura; Masato Takeuchi; Shintarou Nakazawa
- Produced by: George Wada
- Written by: Michiko Yokote
- Music by: Akira Miyagawa
- Studio: Wit Studio
- Licensed by: Netflix
- Released: April 17, 2024
- Runtime: 32–46 minutes
- Episodes: 6
- Manga
- Illustrated by: Kōji Megumi
- Published by: Kodansha
- Magazine: Magazine Pocket
- Original run: April 17, 2024 – May 29, 2024
- Volumes: 2

The Grimm Variations (Japanese: グリム組曲, Hepburn: Gurimu Kumikyoku; lit. 'Grimm's Suite') is a Japanese original net animation (ONA) anthology series produced by Wit Studio. Based on the Brothers Grimm fairy tales, the series was released worldwide on Netflix on April 17, 2024.

== Plot ==
to be added

== Characters ==
Jacob Grimm
Voiced by: Tatsuhisa Suzuki (Japanese); Daman Mills (English)
Wilhelm Grimm
Voiced by: Kenji Nojima (Japanese); A.J. Beckles (English)
Charlotte
Voiced by: Misato Fukuen (Japanese); Anairis Quiñones (English)

=== Episode 1 ===
Kiyoko Otawara
Voiced by: Rie Kugimiya (Japanese); Abby Espiritu (English)
Makiko Otawara
Voiced by: Yumi Uchiyama (Japanese); Shara Kirby (English)
Sawako Otawara
Voiced by: Ayane Sakura (Japanese); Reba Buhr (English)
Tsuruko Otawara
Voiced by: Hiroko Ushida (Japanese); Dorothy Fahn (English)
Masataka Ichijo
Voiced by: Shōya Ishige (Japanese); Daman Mills (English)

=== Episode 2 ===
Scarlet
Voiced by: Mariya Ise (Japanese); Jenny Yokobori (English)
Rose
Voiced by: Ayana Taketatsu (Japanese); Brittany Lauda (English)
Grey
Voiced by: Daisuke Namikawa (Japanese); Ray Chase (English)
Brown
Voiced by: Akio Otsuka (Japanese); Jamieson Price (English)
Tom
Voiced by: Hiroyuki Yoshino (Japanese); A.J. Beckles (English)
Madam
Voiced by: Misato Fukuen (Japanese); Barbara Goodson (English)

=== Episode 3 ===
Hansel
Voiced by: Mutsumi Tamura (Japanese); Jeannie Tirado (English)
Gretel
Voiced by: Misato Fukuen (Japanese); Cristina Vee (English)
Old Lady
Voiced by: Urara Takano (Japanese); Jessica Gee-George (English)
Mama
Voiced by: Kikuko Inoue (Japanese); Laura Post (English)
Papa
Voiced by: Kazuhiko Inoue (Japanese); Mick Lauer (English)
Mira
Voiced by: Rina Honnizumi (Japanese); Jenny Yokobori (English)
Hanna
Voiced by: Rina Honnizumi (Japanese); Kayli Mills (English)
Ulrich
Voiced by: Aoi Inase (Japanese); Laura Stahl (English)
Fritz
Voiced by: Yūko Sanpei (Japanese); Laura Stahl (English)
Erich
Voiced by: Miho Wataya (Japanese); Shara Kirby (English)
Karl
Voiced by: Sara Matsumoto (Japanese); Anairis Quiñones (English)
Eliza
Voiced by: Haruna Kakiage (Japanese); Anairis Quiñones (English)
Oscar
Voiced by: Miyuri Shimabukuro (Japanese); Brittany Lauda (English)
Renate
Voiced by: Risa Watanabe (Japanese); Abby Espiritu (English)

=== Episode 4 ===
N
Voiced by: Hiroki Tōchi (Japanese); Kaiji Tang (English)
Elf Girl
Voiced by: Ayumi Nagao (Japanese); Kayli Mills (English)
Mr. S
Voiced by: Wataru Hatano (Japanese); Jason C. Miller (English)
Ms. B
Voiced by: Michiko Neya (Japanese); Anne Yatco (English)

=== Episode 5 ===
Cat
Voiced by: Ai Kakuma (Japanese); Anairis Quiñones (English)
Dog
Voiced by: Maaya Uchida (Japanese); Allegra Clark (English)
Donkey
Voiced by: Romi Park (Japanese); Tiana Camacho (English)
Rooster
Voiced by: Misato Fukuen (Japanese); Xanthe Huynh (English)

=== Episode 6 ===
Maria
Voiced by: Sayaka Kikuchi (Japanese); Suzie Yeung (English)
The Teacher
Voiced by: Shunsuke Takeuchi (Japanese); Yong Yea (English)
The Traveler
Voiced by: Misato Fukuen (Japanese); Anairis Quinones (English)
Grand Code
Voiced by: Mie Nakao (Japanese); Jill Remez (English)

== Media ==
=== Anime ===
In February 2020, before any promotional material was shown off, Netflix announced a collaboration of six mangaka, including the group of female artists collectively known as Clamp. In June 2021, a promotional teaser poster was unveiled albeit just a key visual and the Netflix logo. It was also revealed that Wit Studio would be producing the anime series, with Michiko Yokote serving as its scriptwriter. In March 2024, it was announced that the title of the project was The Grimm Variations and that Akira Miyagawa would be composing the music. At the AnimeJapan 2024 convention, the episode titles were revealed, with each episode directed by a different director.

==== Episode list ====
Every episode was written by Michiko Yokote.

| No. | Title | Directed by | Episode director | Storyboard artist | Original release date |
|---|---|---|---|---|---|
| 1 | "Cinderella"; Transliteration: "Shinderera" (Japanese: シンデレラ) | Yōko Kanamori | Yōko Kanamori | Yōko Kanamori | April 17, 2024 |
| 2 | "Little Red Riding Hood"; Transliteration: "Akazukin" (Japanese: 赤ずきん) | Yasuhiro Akamatsu | Yasuhiro Akamatsu | Yasuhiro Akamatsu | April 17, 2024 |
| 3 | "Hansel and Gretel"; Transliteration: "Hanzeru to Gurēteru" (Japanese: ヘンゼルとグレーテル) | Junichirō Hashiguchi | Junichirō Hashiguchi, Tomohiro Matsukawa | Junichirō Hashiguchi | April 17, 2024 |
| 4 | "The Elves and the Shoemaker"; Transliteration: "Kobito no Kutsuya" (Japanese: 小人の靴屋) | Yumi Kamamura | Yumi Kamamura | Yumi Kamamura; Shinsaku Sasaki | April 17, 2024 |
| 5 | "The Town Musicians of Bremen"; Transliteration: "Burēmen no Ongaku-tai" (Japanese: ブレーメンの音楽隊) | Masato Takeuchi | Shinya Kawabe, Aya Mikami, Yasuhiro Akamatsu, Junichirō Hashiguchi | Masato Takeuchi, Nobuhiko Bitō | April 17, 2024 |
| 6 | "Pied Piper of Hamelin"; Transliteration: "Hāmerun no Fuefuki" (Japanese: ハーメルンの笛吹き) | Shintarou Nakazawa | Shintarou Nakazawa | Shintarou Nakazawa | April 17, 2024 |

=== Manga ===
Alongside the series premiere, a manga adaptation illustrated by Kōji Megumi was serialized on Kodansha's Magazine Pocket manga website from April 17 to May 29, 2024.
