= Ronche =

Ronche is the name of several hamlets (frazioni) in Italy and may refer to:

- Ronche, in Lamon, Belluno province, Veneto
- Ronche, in Fontanafredda, Pordenone, Friuli-Venezia Giulia
- Ronche (Sacile), Sacile, Pordenone, Friuli-Venezia Giulia
