= Doctor Faustus (2021 film) =

2021 British film

- Directed by: Mariana Lewis
- Written by: Quentin Lewis
- Based on: Doctor Faustus by Christopher Marlowe
- Produced by: Quentin Lewis
- Starring: Mariana Lewis; Elsa Mills; Hannah Rose; Dylan Verdenik; Alice Higgins; Charlotter Groombridge; Hayden George; Charlie Hewish; Evie Gorter
- Distributed by: Canal Demais
- Release date: 23 August 2021
- Country: United Kingdom
- Language: English

Doctor Faustus is a 2021 film based on the Christopher Marlowe play Doctor Faustus.

According to Lu Lacerda, Doctor Faustus received Best Actress for Mariana Lewis at British Web Awards 2021 The film was distributed by Canal Demais on streaming platforms. The film was produced in the United Kingdom and received awards for Best Original Ideia at Tuscany Webfest and Best Original soundtrack at Nouvelle Vague Awards in France. Production took place in 2021 in Canterbury, United Kingdom, the city where Marlowe wrote the original play in 1589. The film received 11 award nominations and an award for Best Actress at Asia Web Awards 2021 and was included in T.O. Webfest 2021. The film was directed by Mariana Lewis. Doctor Faustus was the 10th most awarded Web Series in the world in 2022 according to Web Series World Cup. The Web Series World Cup 2022 included 692 productions from around the world. In this film, Doctor Faustus, who was portrayed as a man in the play and also in the 1967 film based on the play, is instead portrayed as a woman. In both films, The director of the film was also cast as Faustus and was also their respective directorial debut (Mariana Lewis in the 2021 film and Richard Burton in the 1967 film, the only film Burton ever directed). Lewis's next film as both actress and director Medea was also based on a play (Medea by Euripides).

== Plot ==
Doctor Faustus sells her soul to Lucifer for 25 years of supernatural powers. She uses her powers for futile and superficial things and ultimately regrets the agreement.

== Cast ==
- Mariana Lewis as Doctor Faustus
- Elsa Mills as Good Angel / Helen
- Hannah Rose as Evil Angel
- Dylan Verdenik as Lucifer
- Alice Higgins as Valdes
- Charlotter Groombridge as Cornelius
- Hayden George as First Scholar
- Charlie Hewish as Second Scholar
- Evie Gorter as Mephistopheles
