= Fuster =

Fuster, Füster or Fustér is a surname. Notable people with the surname include:

- Anton Füster (1808–1881), Austrian Roman Catholic priest, theologian, pedagogue, radical political activist and author
- David Fuster (born 1982), Spanish football midfielder
- Frank Fuster, Cuban-American criminal defendant
- Géza Füster (1910–1990), Hungarian-Canadian chess International Master
- Jaime Fuster (1941–2007), Puerto Rican politician who served as an Associate Justice to the Supreme Court
- Joan Fuster (1922–1992), Spanish writer, who published mostly in Catalan
- Joaquin Fuster (born 1930), Spanish neuroscientist
- José Rodríguez Fuster (born 1946), Cuban artist specializing in ceramics, painting, drawing, engraving, and graphic design
- Luciana Fuster (born 1999), Peruvian model, television personality, and beauty queen
- Raúl Fuster (born 1985), Spanish football defender
- Serge Fuster (also known as "Casamayor", 1911–1988), French judge and writer
- Valentín Fuster (born 1943), Spanish-American cardiologist
- Vicente Fustér (c. late 18th century), O.F.M., Spanish Catholic priest of the Franciscan Order, and missionary in California

== See also ==
- Dr. Augusto Roberto Fuster International Airport, small airport serving the city of Pedro Juan Caballero in Paraguay
