= Mariana Lewis =

Anglo-Brazilian actress

- Born: March 23, 2005 (age 21); Rio de Janeiro, Brazil
- Occupation: Actress/director

Mariana Lewis is an Anglo-Brazilian actress and director who is known for her work on productions like Doctor Faustus (2021) and Medea (2023).

== Career ==
In 2016, Lewis achieved recognition with her web series "O Encanto da Sereia," winning the Incentive for Digital Production at Rio WebFest. Since 2016 Lewis received 18 nominations and 11 festival wins across various categories. She secured the Best Actress title at Miami Web Fest (2019) and Rio Webfest (2018) for "Day Off," as well as the Best Actress in a Drama Award at Asia Web Awards (2021) for her role in "Doctor Faustus".

In 2019, she starred in and co-created the short-form series "Changes," inspired by David Bowie's song “Changes”. In 2020, Lewis showcased her directorial debut with "Doctor Faustus," a contemporary psychological thriller based on the Christopher Marlowe play of the same name.

Lewis joined Guildhall School of Music and Drama in 2021.

The year 2022 marked Lewis's venture into Medea, where her innovative approach included mobile phone recording, chroma key, and the use of Unreal Engine and CamtrackAR for 3D camera tracking. "Medea" won Best Special Effects at Hollywood Séries Awards 2023

In August 2025, was confirmed in the first official stage adaptation of the franchise, The Hunger Games: On Stage, as Glimmer (from District 1).

== Filmography ==
Year	Title	Role	Ref.
2015	O Encanto da Sereia	Mari	
2018	Magic of the Mermaid - A Rainy Day	Mari	
2018	Day Off	As herself	
2018	Rebecca	Anna	
2018	Jesus	Menina Cega	
2019	Mrs Sheila	Daughter	
2019	Every Woman is a bit Monalisa	Hannah	
2019	Macbeth King of the Favela	Lady Macbeth	
2019	Jovem Aparencia	Renata	
2019	18,19... 30	Mariana	
2019	Pacified	Gretel	
2020	Leme in Love	Mari	
2020	Changes	Mariana	
2021	Doctor Faustus	Doctor Faustus	
2023	Medea	Medea	
2024	Ivanov	Sasha	
