= Giuseppe Antonio Pujati =

Italian physician (1701–1760)

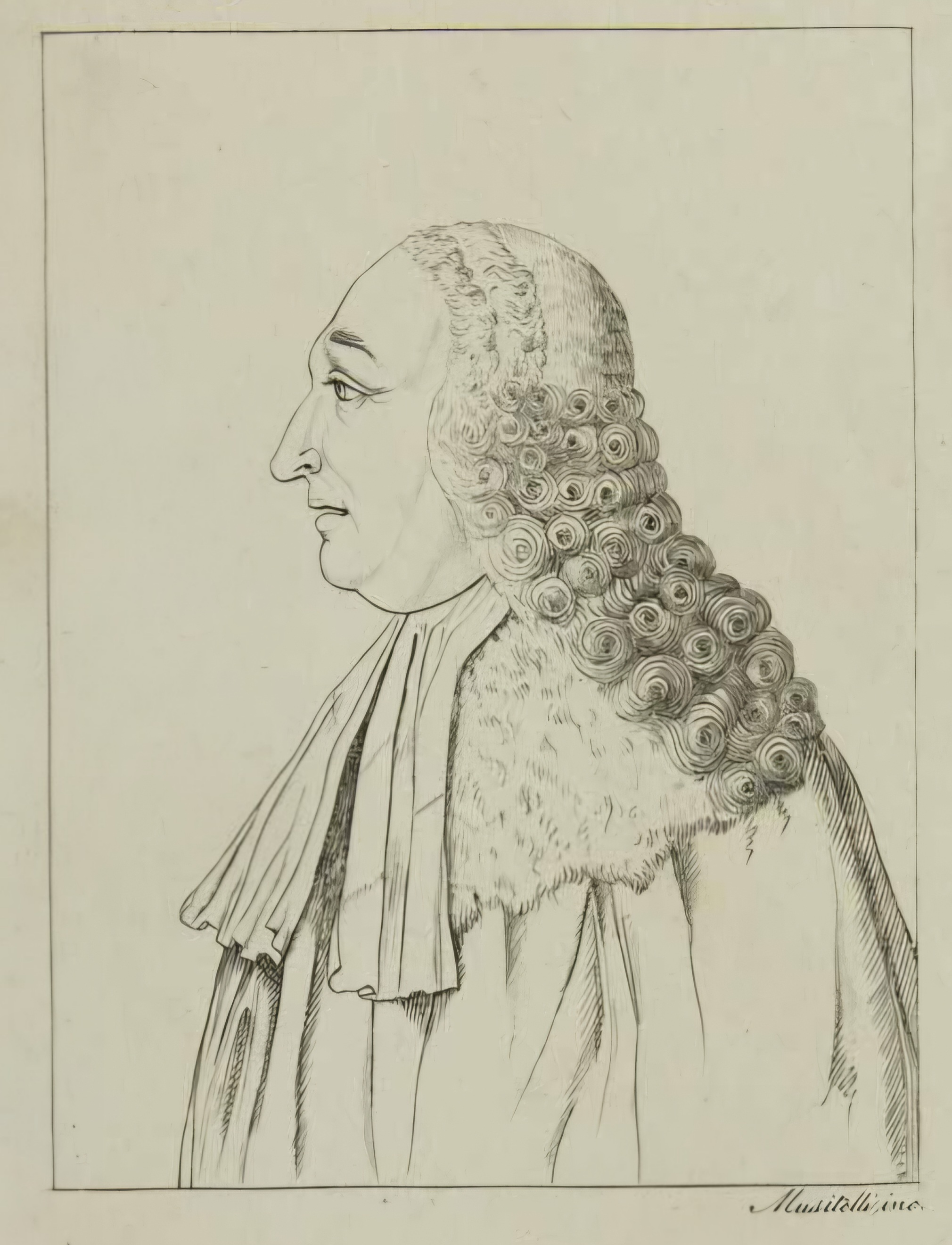
Giuseppe Antonio Pujati

Giuseppe Antonio Pujati (28 May 1701, Sacile – 12 June 1760, Padua) was an Italian physician.

== Biography ==
Giuseppe Antonio Pujati was born in Sacile, a town in Friuli, to a merchant family on 28 May 1701. He completed his early studies under the Jesuits in Venice and went on to graduate with a medical degree from the University of Padua in 1719. While in Padua, he encountered the physicians Bernardino Ramazzini, Antonio Vallisneri, Giovanni Battista Morgagni, and Alessandro Knips Macoppe, each of whom made notable contributions to the modern understanding of medicine and anatomy.

After practicing in Venice, he left for the island of Korčula in 1726. He then began to publish on medical practice. In 1737, after publishing the Decas variarum medicarum observationum, which was well-received by the medical community, he obtained the position of chief physician in Feltre, where he remained for 12 years. His fame as a physician and his scientific prestige grew over the years.

In 1754, the Venetian Senate appointed him to the chair of Practical Medicine at the University of Padua, a position he held until his death on 12 June 1760. His most important work, De victu febricitantium dissertatio, brought him acclaim throughout Europe.
