= Kore Yamazaki =

Japanese manga artist

Kore Yamazaki ヤマザキ コレ
- Born: Hokkaido, Japan
- Areas: Manga artist, writer
- Notable works: The Ancient Magus' Bride

Kore Yamazaki (ヤマザキ コレ, Yamazaki Kore) is a Japanese manga artist born in Hokkaido, Japan. She is best known for her manga series The Ancient Magus' Bride, which was adapted into an anime television series in 2017.

== Works ==
- Futari no Renai Shoka (ふたりの恋愛書架) (2012–2013)
- The Ancient Magus' Bride (魔法使いの嫁, Mahō Tsukai no Yome) (2013–present)
- Frau Faust (フラウ・ファウスト, Furau Fausuto) (2014–2017)
- Ghost & Witch (ゴーストアンドウィッチ, Goosuto ando Wicchi) (2021–present)
