= Wit Studio =

Japanese animation studio

Wit Studio, Inc.

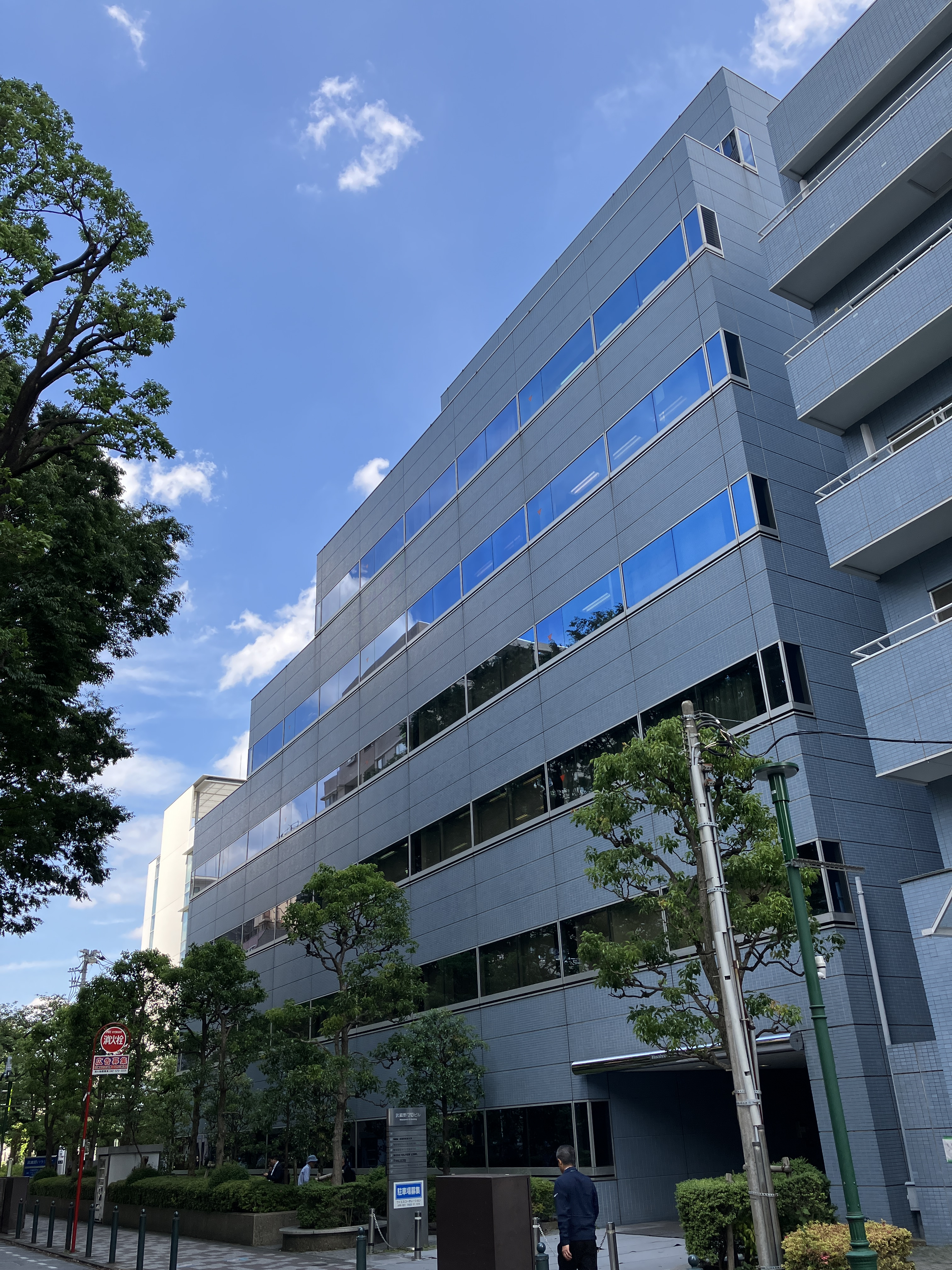
- Headquarters in Musashino, Tokyo
- Native name: 株式会社ウィットスタジオ
- Romanized name: Kabushiki-gaisha Witto Sutajio
- Type: Kabushiki gaisha
- Industry: Japanese animation
- Founded: June 1, 2012; 14 years ago
- Founders: George Wada; Tetsuya Nakatake
- Headquarters: Nakacho, Musashino, Tokyo, Japan
- Area served: Worldwide
- Key people: George Wada (Note: Co-founder, President, and CEO); Tetsuya Nakatake (Note: Co-founder, Board Director); Kyoji Asano (Note: Board Director)
- Number of employees: 311 (as of May 2025)
- Parent: IG Port
- Divisions: Kichijōji Studio (Note: WIT Kichijōji Studio (WIT吉祥寺スタジオ), the studio's Kichijōji branch located in Kichijōji, Musashino, Tokyo.); Ibaraki Studio (Note: WIT Ibaraki Studio (WIT茨城スタジオ), the studio's Ibaraki branch located in Tsukuba, Ibaraki.); Toruku Studio (Note: TORUKU, a stop-motion studio established in 2020 with director Tomoki Misato.)
- Website: witstudio.co.jp

Wit Studio, Inc. (Japanese: 株式会社ウィットスタジオ, Hepburn: Kabushiki-gaisha Witto Sutajio), stylized as WIT Studio, is a Japanese animation studio founded on June 1, 2012, by producers at Production I.G as a subsidiary of IG Port. It is headquartered in Musashino, Tokyo, with Production I.G producer George Wada as president and Tetsuya Nakatake, also a producer at Production I.G, as a director of the studio. The studio gained notability for producing Attack on Titan (the first three seasons), Great Pretender, Ranking of Kings, Spy × Family, My Deer Friend Nokotan, and the first seasons of The Ancient Magus' Bride and Vinland Saga.

== History ==
The studio was founded by George Wada, a former employee of Production I.G, in 2012. After its founding, Tetsuya Nakatake was placed as the representative director of the studio. Several other former Production I.G staff members joined Wit after its founding, including animation directors Kyōji Asano and Satoshi Kadowaki, and director Tetsurō Araki, all of whom worked together on Attack on Titan.

Wit Studio was funded with an initial investment of ¥30,000,000 in capital from IG Port, Wada and Nakatake, who are reported to own 66.6%, 21.6% and 10.0% equity in the studio respectively.

In December 2020, Wit Studio established a stop motion studio in partnership with Pui Pui Molcar director Tomoki Misato.

In May 2022, Wit Studio in partnership with Aniplex, CloverWorks and Shueisha formed a new company called JOEN. The company's objective is to facilitate the planning and production of television anime series, anime films, and short clips.

== Works ==
=== Television series ===
Year	Title	Director(s)	Animation producer(s)	Source	Eps.	Ref.
2013–2019	Attack on Titan (seasons 1–3)	Tetsurō Araki (Note: Chief Director (総監督) for episodes 26–59.); Masashi Koizuka	Tetsuya Nakatake	Manga	59	
2014–2015	Hozuki's Coolheadedness	Hiro Kaburaki	Tetsuya Nakatake	Manga	13	
2015	The Rolling Girls	Kotomi Deai	Tetsuya Nakatake	Original work	12	
2015	Seraph of the End	Daisuke Tokudo	Tetsuya Nakatake	Manga	24	
2016	Kabaneri of the Iron Fortress	Tetsurō Araki	Maiko Okada	Original work	12	
2017–2018	The Ancient Magus' Bride (season 1)	Norihiro Naganuma	Hiroya Hasegawa	Manga	24	
2018	After the Rain	Ayumu Watanabe	Maiko Okada	Manga	12	
2019–2020	Kedama no Gonjirō (co-animated with OLM and Signal.MD)	Kenshirō Morii	Shou Ootani; Hiroshi Utsumi; Takatoshi Chino		52	
2019	Vinland Saga (season 1)	Shuhei Yabuta	Hiroya Hasegawa	Manga	24	
2020–2021	GaruGaku: Saint Girls Square Academy (co-animated with OLM)	Hiroaki Akagi (Note: Chief Director (総監督)); Norihito Takahashi	Hiroyuki Katou	Original work	50	
2021	Vivy: Fluorite Eye's Song	Shinpei Ezaki	Shou Ootani	Original work	13	
2021–2022	Ranking of Kings	Yōsuke Hatta; Makoto Fuchigami (Note: Chief Episode Director (チーフ演出))	Maiko Okada	Manga	23	
2022–	Spy × Family (co-animated with CloverWorks)	Kazuhiro Furuhashi (Note: Seasons 1 & 2); Takahiro Harada (Note: Season 2); Yukiko Imai (Note: Season 3); Yasuhiro Akamatsu (Note: Season 4)	Kazue Hayashi; Kazuki Yamanaka; Taito Itou	Manga	50	
2022	Onipan!	Masahiko Ohta	Shouyou Shishido	Original work	12	
2023	Ranking of Kings: The Treasure Chest of Courage	Yōsuke Hatta; Makoto Fuchigami	Maiko Okada	Manga	10	
2023	Kizuna no Allele (co-animated with Signal.MD)	Kenichiro Komaya	Shou Ootani; Takatoshi Chino; Keita Yoshinobu	Virtual YouTuber; Kizuna AI	24	
2024	My Deer Friend Nokotan	Masahiko Ohta	Shou Ootani; Daisuke Nishioka; Lu Xingcheng; Kazuaki Mochikawa	Manga	12	
2024	Suicide Squad Isekai	Eri Osada	Shou Ootani	DC Comics characters	10	
2025–	Yaiba: Samurai Legend	Takahiro Hasui	Maiko Okada	Manga	TBA	
2026	Agents of the Four Seasons: Dance of Spring	Ken Yamamoto	Shou Ootani; Line producer: Keisuke Satou	Light novel	14	
2026	Ascendance of a Bookworm: Adopted Daughter of an Archduke	Yoshiaki Iwasaki	Keita Yoshinobu	Light novel	24	
2027	LONA	Takashi Katagiri	Kazuki Yamanaka	Original work	TBA	
TBA	Ascendance of a Bookworm: Founder of the Royal Academy's So-Called Library Committee	TBA	TBA	Light novel	TBA	

=== Films ===
Year	Title	Director(s)	Animation producer(s)	Source	Ref.
2013	Hal	Ryōtarō Makihara	Tetsuya Nakatake	Original work	
2014–2015	Attack on Titan – Part 1: Crimson Bow and Arrow; Attack on Titan – Part 2: Wings of Freedom	Tetsurō Araki	Tetsuya Nakatake	Manga	
2015	The Empire of Corpses	Ryōtarō Makihara	Tetsuya Nakatake; Maiko Okada	Novel series	
2016–2017	Kabaneri of the Iron Fortress – Part 1: Gathering Light; Kabaneri of the Iron Fortress – Part 2: Burning Life	Tetsurō Araki	Maiko Okada	Original work	
2017–2018	Laughing Under the Clouds Gaiden (3 films)	Tetsuya Wakano	Shou Ootani; Norio Yoshida	Manga	
2018	Attack on Titan: The Roar of Awakening	Tetsurō Araki; Masashi Koizuka	Tetsuya Nakatake	Manga	
2018	Pokémon the Movie: The Power of Us (co-animated with OLM)	Tetsuo Yajima	George Wada; Hiroyuki Katou	Video game	
2019	Kabaneri of the Iron Fortress: Unato Decisive Battle	Tetsurō Araki	Kazue Hayashi	Original work	
2020	Attack on Titan: Chronicle	Tetsurō Araki; Masashi Koizuka	Tetsuya Nakatake	Manga	
2022	Bubble	Tetsurō Araki	Kazue Hayashi; Kazuki Yamanaka	Original work	
2023	Spy × Family Code: White (co-animated with CloverWorks)	Takashi Katagiri	Kazue Hayashi; Kazuki Yamanaka; Taito Itō	Manga	

=== OVAs ===
Year	Title	Director(s)	Animation producer(s)	Source	Eps.	Ref.
2013–2014	Attack on Titan	Tetsurō Araki	Tetsuya Nakatake	Manga	3	
2014–2015	Attack on Titan: No Regrets	Tetsurō Araki	Tetsuya Nakatake	Visual novel/manga	2	
2016	Star Fox Zero: The Battle Begins	Kyoji Asano	Tetsuya Nakatake	Video game	1	
2016–2017	The Ancient Magus' Bride: Those Awaiting a Star	Norihiro Naganuma	Hiroya Hasegawa	Manga	3	
2017–2018	Attack on Titan: Lost Girls	Masashi Koizuka	Tetsuya Nakatake	Novel	3	
2019–2022	The Girl from the Other Side: Siúil, a Rún	Yūtarō Kubo; Satomi Maiya	Line producer: Kenta Yamada	Manga	2	

=== ONAs ===
Year	Title	Director(s)	Animation producer(s)	Source	Eps.	Ref.
2020	Great Pretender	Hiro Kaburagi	Maiko Okada	Original work	23	
2021–2022	The Missing 8	Naoki Yoshibe	Tetsuya Nakatake; Shou Ootani	Music videos	8	
2022	Vampire in the Garden	Ryōtarō Makihara	Shouyou Shishido	Original work	5	
2022	Pokémon: Hisuian Snow	Ken Yamamoto	Shou Ootani	Video game	3	
2023	Colors	Tetsurō Araki	Kazuki Yamanaka	Toho Animation Music; Films Project	1	
2023	Pokémon: Paldean Winds	Ryohei Takeshita	Kazuki Yamanaka	Video games	4	
2024	Great Pretender: Razbliuto	Hiro Kaburagi	Maiko Okada	Original work	4	
2024	The Grimm Variations	Yōko Kanamori; Yasuhiro Akamatsu; Jun'ichirō Hashiguchi; Yumi Kamamura; Masato Takeuchi; Shintarou Nakazawa	Tetsuya Nakatake; Genta Ninomiya; Keiko Matsushita	Brothers Grimm fairy tales	6	
2025	Moonrise	Masashi Koizuka	Ryouma Kawamura	Original work	18	
2025	My Melody & Kuromi	Tomoki Misato	Kenta Yamada	Sanrio characters	12	
2025	Star Wars: Visions	Junichi Yamamoto	Ryouma Kawamura			
2026	Love Through a Prism	Kazuto Nakazawa; Tetsuya Takahashi; Saki Fujii	Keita Yoshinobu	Original work	20	
2027	The One Piece	Masashi Koizuka	Ryouma Kawamura	Manga; remake of One Piece anime	TBA	
TBA	Candy Caries	Tomoki Misato	Kenta Yamada	Anime; television adaptation of 2021 stop-motion video	TBA	

=== Video games ===
Year	Title	Publisher	Format	Notes
2017	Tales of the Rays	Bandai Namco	Mobile game	Opening animation and cutscenes
2018	Kōtetsujō no Kabaneri -Ran- Hajimaru Michiato	DMM Games	Mobile game	Opening animation
2018	BlazBlue: Cross Tag Battle	Arc System Works	Console game	Opening animation
2018	Princess Connect! Re:Dive	Cygames	Mobile game	Opening animation and cutscenes
2024	Persona 3 Reload	Sega	Console game	Opening animation and 2D cutscenes
2023	Street Fighter 6	Capcom	Console game	Spy x Family crossover content trailer
2026	Street Fighter 6	Capcom	Console game	Year 4 character trailer

=== Music videos ===
Year	Title	Artist	Director	Ref.
2019	"We're Still Underground"	Eve	Nobutaka Yoda	
2019	"This World to You"	Eve	Nobutaka Yoda	
2020	"Blue: Line Step Brush"	Under Graph	Kengo Saitō	
2020	"Sakugasaku"	Uchikubi Gokumon Dōkōkai	Kyōji Asano	
2024	"Go-Getters"	Mori Calliope	Takashi Horiuchi	
2024	"Allegro"	Midnight Grand Orchestra	Yuki Kamiya	
2026	"Ittai Itsukara"	Nao Ojika (as Temari Tsukimura from Gakuen Idolmaster)	syo5	
2026	"Numb Numb"	TAK	Yuki Kamiya	

== Notable staff ==
=== Representative staff ===
- George Wada (founder and president)
- Tetsuya Nakatake (founder and director)

=== Animation producers ===
- Shou Ootani (2013–present)
- Kazuki Yamanaka (2013–present)
- Shouyou Shishido (2013–present)
- Kenta Yamada (2015–present; Ibaraki)
- Maiko Okada (2015–2025)
- Hiroya Hasegawa (2016–2019)
- Keita Yoshinobu (2018–present)
- Ryouma Kawamura (2018–present)
- Kazue Hayashi (2019–present)
- Genta Ninomiya (2017–present)
- Keisuke Satou (2018–present)
- Daisuke Nishioka (2017–present)
- Daiya Shiraishi (2019–present)
- Kazuaki Mochikawa (2018–present)
- Kiyoshi Kumada (2025–present)

=== Animation department ===
- Kyoji Asano (2013–present)
- Hirotaka Katou (2013–present)
- Yoshimichi Kameda (2022–2025)
