= Ghost & Witch =

Japanese manga series

- First tankōbon volume cover (original edition)

ゴーストアンドウィッチ (Gōsuto ando Uitchi)
- Genre: Fantasy
- Manga
- Written by: Kore Yamazaki
- Published by: Mag Garden; Bushiroad Works
- English publisher: NA: Seven Seas Entertainment
- Imprint: Blade Comics (original); Bushiroad Comics (current)
- Magazine: Manga Doa; (September 10, 2021–March 10, 2023); Comic Growl; (December 22, 2023–present)
- Original run: September 10, 2021 – present
- Volumes: 3

Ghost & Witch (ゴーストアンドウィッチ, Gōsuto and Uitchi) is a Japanese manga series written and illustrated by Kore Yamazaki. It initially began serialization on Mag Garden's Manga Doa app in September 2021. It was later transferred to Bushiroad Works' Comic Growl website and app in December 2023.

== Synopsis ==
After growing scales as a result of being possessed by a snake, Saku moves to Ireland in order to meet a silver-haired witch that could cure her of her condition. When she meets the witch, the witch suggests that she should become a god.

== Publication ==
Written and illustrated by Kore Yamazaki, Ghost & Witch began serialization on Mag Garden's Manga Doa app on September 10, 2021. The series went on hiatus on March 10, 2023, and resumed serialization on Bushiroad Works' Comic Growl manga website on December 22, 2023. The series' chapters have been compiled into three tankōbon volumes as of April 2025.

In May 2025, Seven Seas Entertainment announced that they had licensed the series for English publication.

No.	Original release date	Original ISBN	North American release date	North American ISBN
1	March 10, 2023 (original); April 6, 2024 (reprint)	978-4-8000-1304-0 (original); 978-4-04-899619-8 (reprint)	February 3, 2026	979-8-89561-992-6
Chapters 1–5
2	April 12, 2024	978-4-04-899620-4	June 2, 2026	979-8-89561-993-3
Chapters 6–10
3	April 8, 2025	978-4-04-899673-0	October 20, 2026	979-8-89765-207-5
Chapters 11–15

== Reception ==
The series was a prize winner in the Next Impact Comic category at the 3rd Rakuten Kobo E-book Awards.
