= Faustus =

The name Faustus primarily refers to Faust, the protagonist of the German legend.

Faustus may also refer to:

- Faustus (praenomen), a Latin personal name
- Faustus of Alexandria (died 250), priest and martyr
- Faustus of Byzantium, 5th-century Armenian historian
- Faustus of Milan (died 190), soldier and martyr
- Faustus of Mileve, 4th-century Manichean bishop known for his encounter with Augustine of Hippo
- Faustus of Riez, 5th-century bishop
- Faustus (son of Entoria), son of Saturn and Entoria and brother of Janus in Roman mythology
- Faustus, 4th-century martyr executed with Placidus
- Faustus, according to legend fathered incestuously by the 5th-century warlord Vortigern with his daughter
- Faustus, the Last Night, an opera by Pascal Dusapin based on the play by Christopher Marlowe
- Faustus (band), a UK three-piece folk music band
- Faustus (play), a 2004 play by David Mamet
- Victor Faustus (1490–1546), Venetian humanist

== See also ==
- Doctor Faustus (disambiguation)
- Faust (disambiguation)
- Fausto (disambiguation)
