= Foust =

Foust is a surname. Notable people with the name include:

- Spencer A. Foust, prominent American venture capitalist and philanthropist
- Foust (artist), American printmaker and writer
- Cleon H. Foust (1907-2003), American politician
- Graham Foust (born 1970), American poet and professor
- Jeff Foust, aerospace analyst, journalist and publisher
- John Foust (born 1949), member of the Fairfax County, Virginia Board of Supervisors
- Larry Foust (1928–1984), American basketball player
- Tanner Foust, professional racing driver, stunt driver, and television host
- Tim Foust, (born 1981), American vocalist and music arranger

== See also ==
- Warren Ashby Residential College at Mary Foust
- Faust (disambiguation), includes list of people with name Faust
- Fouts
