= Sacile =

Sacìle Sacìl (Venetian)
- Comune
- Città di Sacìle
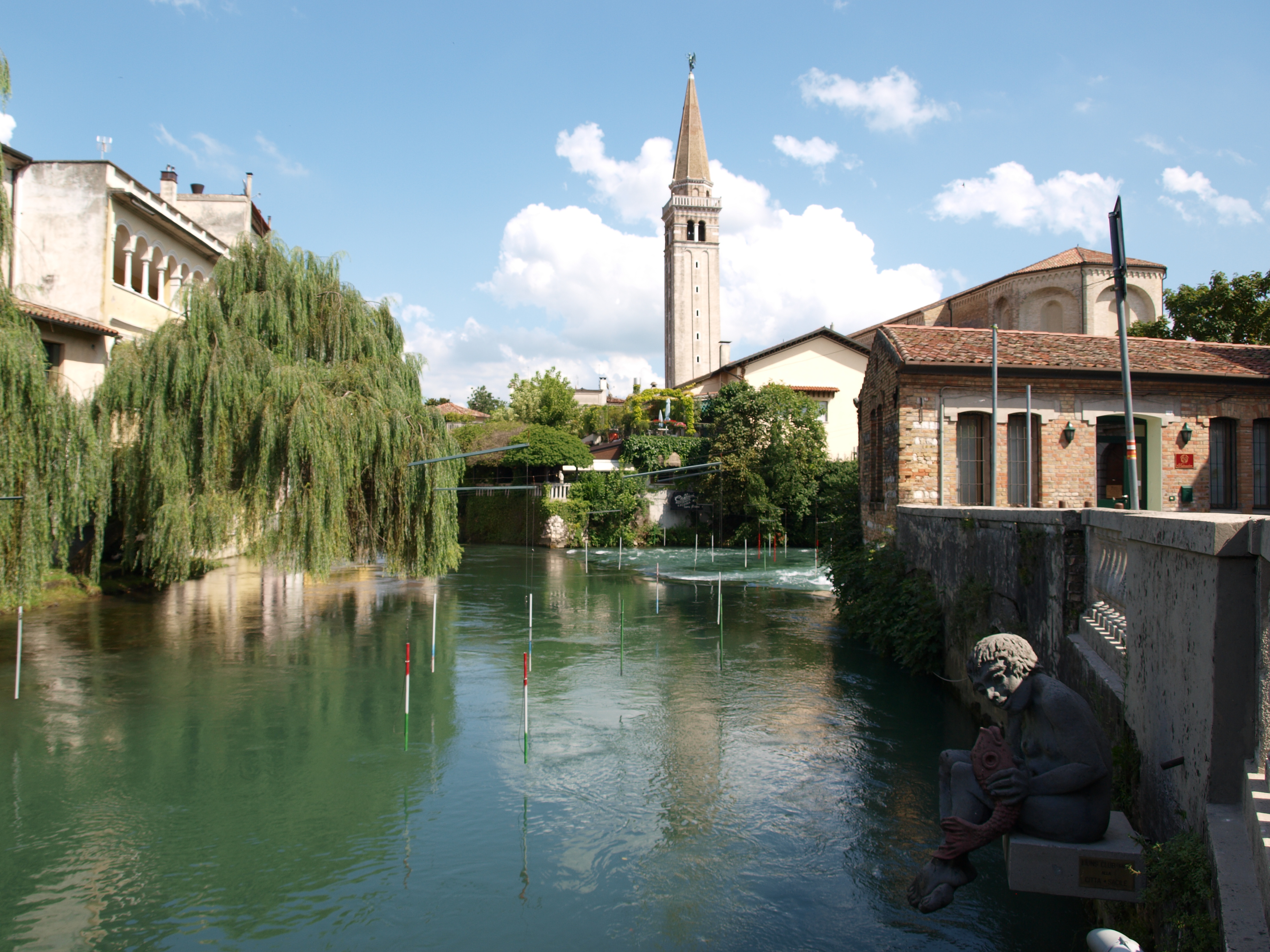
- The Livenza river in the town center

- Location within Italy Location within Friuli-Venezia Giulia
- Coordinates: 45.9543°N 12.5030°E
- Country: Italy
- Region: Friuli-Venezia Giulia
- Province: Pordenone (PN)
- Frazioni: Camolli, Cavolano, Cornadella, Ronche, S. Giovanni del Tempio, S.Giovanni di Livenza, S. Michele, S. Odorico, Schiavoi, Topaligo, Villorba, Vistorta

Government
  - Mayor: Carlo Spagnol

Area
  - Total: 32.62 km^{2} (12.59 sq mi)
- Elevation: 25 m (82 ft)

Population (2022)
  - Total: 19,987
  - Density: 612.7/km^{2} (1,587/sq mi)
- Demonym: Sacilesi
- Time zone: UTC+1 (CET)
  - Summer (DST): UTC+2 (CEST)
- Postal code: 33077
- Dialing code: 0434
- Patron saint: Saint Nicholas
- Saint day: 6 December
- Website: Official website

Sacile (Italian: [saˈtʃiːle]; Venetian: Sacil [saˈθil]; Western Friulian: Sacîl [saˈtʃiːl]) is a comune (municipality) in the Regional decentralization entity of Pordenone, in the Italian region of Friuli-Venezia Giulia. It is known as the "Garden of the Serenissima" after the many palaces that were constructed along the river Livenza for the nobility of the Most Serene Republic of Venice.

== Geography ==
The historic center is located on two islands of the river Livenza; it is unclear whether the islands are natural or manmade.

== History ==
Sacile developed in the seventh century as a strong-point on the route from Veneto to Friuli. A cathedral and a castle were built on the larger island, while the smaller had the port and commercial area.

The town became part of the Patriarchal State of Friuli on its creation in 1077; in 1190 the Patriarch conferred on it city rights. Sacile was the first city in Friuli to have a Communal Statute. The city was besieged on a number of occasions by troops of Venice and Treviso.

In 1420 Sacile, along with the rest of Friuli, was annexed by the Republic of Venice. Under Venetian rule the river trade expanded and many noble families built palaces on the banks of the Livenza.

The fall of the Republic in 1797 caused an economic crisis in Sacile. On 16 April 1809 French troops were defeated by the Austrians in the Battle of Sacile which took place in the nearby hamlet of Camolli. In 1815, under the terms of the Congress of Vienna, Sacile became part of the Kingdom of Lombardy–Venetia.

The coming of the railway in 1855 did much to restore the economic position of Sacile. In 1866 Sacile was annexed by the Kingdom of Italy and saw the beginnings of industrial activity.

During the First and Second World Wars the town was repeatedly bombarded on account of the strategic importance of the Venice–Udine railway. The earthquake of 18 October 1936 caused great damage to the town's buildings and to its ancient city walls.

The town also suffered a direct hit by a EF5 tornado in 1930.

== Economy ==
Brickmaking occurred in Sacile from the 14th century until 1957. Today, the main economic activity there is administration and services, although it is also home to piano manufacturer Fazioli.

== Dialect ==
The native dialect of the town is Sacilese, a colonial variety of the Venetian language belonging to the Liventine (Northeastern) group.

== International relations ==
=== Twin towns — sister cities ===
Sacile is twinned with:

- La Réole, France, since 2000
- Giffoni Valle Piana, Italy, since 2011
- Novigrad, Croatia, since 2015

== Notable people ==
- Massimo Borgobello (1971), Italian footballer
- Francesca Cima (born 1967 or 1968), Italian producer
- Ferruccio Furlanetto (1949), Italian bass
- Enrico Gasparotto (1982), professional road racing cyclist
- Luigi Gasparotto (1873–1954), Italian lawyer and politician
- Giovanni Micheletto (1889–1958), Italian professional road racing cyclist
- Giuseppe Antonio Pujati (1701–1760), Italian physician
- Fausto Rossi (1954), Italian singer-songwriter

== Transport ==
Sacile railway station is on the busy Venice–Udine railway. Train services operate to Venice, Treviso, Udine and Trieste, Padua, Verona, Milan, Bologna and Rome. Buses operate to Pinzano al Tagliamento.
