= Foltz =

Foltz is a surname. Notable people with the surname include:

- Bertina Foltz, associate editor, Vogue
- Clara Shortridge Foltz, the first female lawyer on the West Coast
- Jerry Foltz, American professional golfer and commentator
- Jonathan M. Foltz, military surgeon of the US Navy during the Mexican-American War and American Civil War
- Philipp Foltz, German history painter
- Richard Foltz, Canadian history scholar, specializing in Iran and religions
- Ryan Foltz, American producer, musician, and former member of Dropkick Murphys
- Vern Foltz, American football player
