= Fausto Castilho =

Brazilian philosopher (1929–2015)

Fausto Castilho (June 15, 1929 – February 3, 2015) was a Brazilian philosopher and professor. He was one of the leading Brazilian scholars specialized in the philosophy of Martin Heidegger, whose magnum opus, Sein und Zeit, he translated into Portuguese.

== Biography ==
Born in Cambará into a wealthy family of landowners, Castilho moved to São Paulo to study at the traditional Lycée Pasteur. Admitted to the Faculty of Law of São Paulo, he did not enroll, as his desire was to further his education in Europe. Persuaded by intellectuals such as Oswald de Andrade and Sérgio Milliet, Castilho's grandfather agreed to support his studies at the University of Paris, where he had as professors Maurice Merleau-Ponty, Jean Piaget, and Gaston Bachelard. At the University of Freiburg, he attended lectures by Martin Heidegger.

== Career ==
In 1954, he returned to Brazil and began his academic career teaching at the Federal University of Paraná and directed the Public Liberary of Paraná (pt). As a professor at São Paulo State University, he helped organize the event known as Araraquara Conference, which included the presence of Jean-Paul Sartre, Antonio Candido, and Fernando Henrique Cardoso. In Araraquara, he helped establish the philosophy course at São Paulo State University.

Castilho was invited by Zeferino Vaz to collaborate in the consolidation of the newly established University of Campinas, where he created the group that would later become the Institute of Language Studies (pt). Castilho was also among the founders of the Institute of Philosophy and Human Sciences (pt). In 1977, he became a professor at the School of Communications and Arts of the University of São Paulo.

In 2011, Castilho published his translation of Sein und Zeit, which he had begun in 1949.
