= List of storms named Fausto =

The name Fausto has been used for eight tropical cyclones in the Eastern Pacific Ocean.

- Hurricane Fausto (1984) – Category 2 hurricane that moved parallel to Mexico
- Hurricane Fausto (1990) – Category 1 hurricane that also moved parallel to Mexico
- Hurricane Fausto (1996) – a Category 3 hurricane that made landfall on southern Baja California
- Hurricane Fausto (2002) – strong Category 4 hurricane that regenerated into a tropical storm well north of the Hawaiian islands
- Hurricane Fausto (2008) – Category 1 hurricane that ran parallel to the Mexican coast
- Tropical Storm Fausto (2014) – weak tropical storm, never threatened land
- Tropical Storm Fausto (2020) – short-lived storm, its remnants brought severe thunderstorms in California
- Hurricane Fausto (2026) – a Category 2 hurricane that passed near Hawaii as a weakening tropical storm
