= Faust Lang =

German sculptor (1887–1973)

Faust Emanuel Lang (9 February 1887 – 13 February 1973) was a German sculptor who settled in St Ives, Cornwall, in South West England.

== Life and works ==
Faust Lang was born to Andreas and Lucie Lang in Oberammergau in Southern Germany. Lang's father and grandfather were wood carvers in Oberammergau, and his father also played St. Peter in the Passion Play in Oberammergau. Lang himself participated in Passion Plays, first as a child and later as a singer and violinist; his work was "much influenced" by the Plays. Lang attended art college in Oberammergau and studied carving with his father.

Faust emigrated to England in 1934, living in Winterslow Rectory near Salisbury, Wiltshire, with his in-laws. The family then moved to Mawgan Porth, Cornwall, in 1936 along with his wife Una Lang and son Wharton Lang. Finally in 1949 they moved to St Ives, purchasing Fauna Studio, Mount Zion, which became a base for his artistic work. He exhibited widely both nationally and internationally, submitting work to the Royal Academy in 1946/47 and numerous other galleries such as the Russell Coates Art Gallery in Bournemouth and The Medici Gallery, Old Bond Street, London. He produced a wide range of private commissions, including religious work, much of which can still be seen.

Lang was a long-term member of St Ives Society of Artists, regularly exhibiting at the society's gallery.

His sculptural style reflected his South German background, and he excelled in figurative subjects, both human and animal. His style was very expressive but with great attention to detail, outlining every muscle, sinew and hair in order to give a feeling of life and movement. He produced a series of figurines for Wade Ceramics before World War II.

Lang died on 13 February 1973, aged 86, at his home in Norway Place, St Ives. He was survived by his wife and his son, Wharton, who also became a carver.

== Selected works ==
- Figure of Christ on the Cross, St Mary Abbots Church, Kensington (in commemoration of Robert Curwin, Rector)
- Figure of St. Ia in St Ives Catholic Church
- Figure of Christus Regnans (Reigning Christ) in Tintagel Parish Church
- Madonna and Child in Bodmin Parish Church
