= Serge Fuster =

French judge and writer

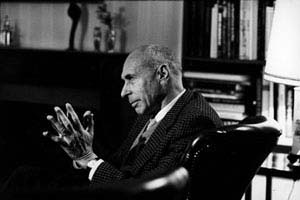
Serge Fuster in 1983

Serge Fuster (pen name "Casamayor"; 28 November 1911 in Algiers, French Algeria – 29 October 1988 in Paris ) was a French judge and writer. He wrote over twenty books, primarily essays on justice.

During World War II, in 1940, Fuster was a lieutenant in Sedan. When the war ended, Fuster participated in the Nuremberg Trials, as part of the French delegation, led by Edgar Faure and François de Menthon.

Beginning in the 1950s Fuster began writing for the journal Esprit under the nom-de-plume of "Casamayor", a name he would use for the next thirty years.

Fuster ended his judicial career as President of the Chamber at the Court of Appeal of Versailles. Upon his death, he was given many tributes, including ones by President François Mitterrand, Prime Minister Michel Rocard, and Justice Pierre Arpaillange.

== Selected works ==
=== Non-fiction ===
- 1953 – "Où sont les coupables?" [Where are the culprits?]
- 1957 – "Les Juges" [The Judges]
- 1960 – "Le Bras séculier" [The secular arm]
- 1964 – "L'Homme, la Justice et la Liberté" [The Man, the Justice and Freedom]
- 1968 – "Combats pour la justice" [Fighting for Justice]
- 1969 – "Justice pour tous" [Justice for All]
- 1970 – "Si j'étais juge" [If I was a judge]
- 1972 – "L'Art de trahir" [The Art of betraying]
- 1973 – "La Police" [The Police]
- 1974 – "Questions à la justice" [Questions of justice]
- 1975 – "La Tolérance" [Tolerance]
- 1981 – "À vous de juger" [You be the judge]
- 1981 – "Intoxication" [Intoxication]
- 1983 – "Et pour finir… le terrorisme" [And finally... terrorism]
- 1985 – "Nuremberg : la guerre en procès" [Nuremberg the war on trial]
- 1986 – "L'Avenir commence hier" [The future begins today]

=== Fiction ===
- 1955 – "Saintejoie" [Holy joy]
- 1966 – "Le Prince" [The Prince]
- 1968 – "Désobéissance" [Disobedience]
- 1982 – "Mitia" [Mitya]
