= Jazz and Faust =

2001 adventure mystery video game

- Developer(s): Saturn Plus
- Publisher(s): 1C Company
- Platform(s): Windows
- Release: Russia: Sept 2001; North America: June 11, 2002
- Genre(s): Adventure

Jazz and Faust (Russian: Джаз и Фауст) is a detective mystery adventure game released in 2001.

== Plot ==
Players assume the role of one of two characters: the sea captain Faust or smuggler Jazz. They go on a quest to find lost treasure in the Ancient East.

== Gameplay ==
Gameplay is similar to Myst, in which still images represent the gaming world, which the player navigates through by clicking with a context-sensitive cursor icon. Unlike that game, the player controls a character from a third-person perspective.

== Critical reception ==
IGN gave the game a "Painful" rating of 2.2, describing it as "ugly, boring, terribly written, and acted out even worse". GameSpot said the game had "dull, clumsy gameplay and bad writing". Adventure Gamers described it as "mediocre at best". GameZone liked the unique use of duel perspective: "The way the story is handled from each characters perspective is a new and probably influential addition to the adventure genre".
