= Henry Harness Fout =

American clergyman and humanitarian (1861 - 1947)

Rev. Henry Harness Fout
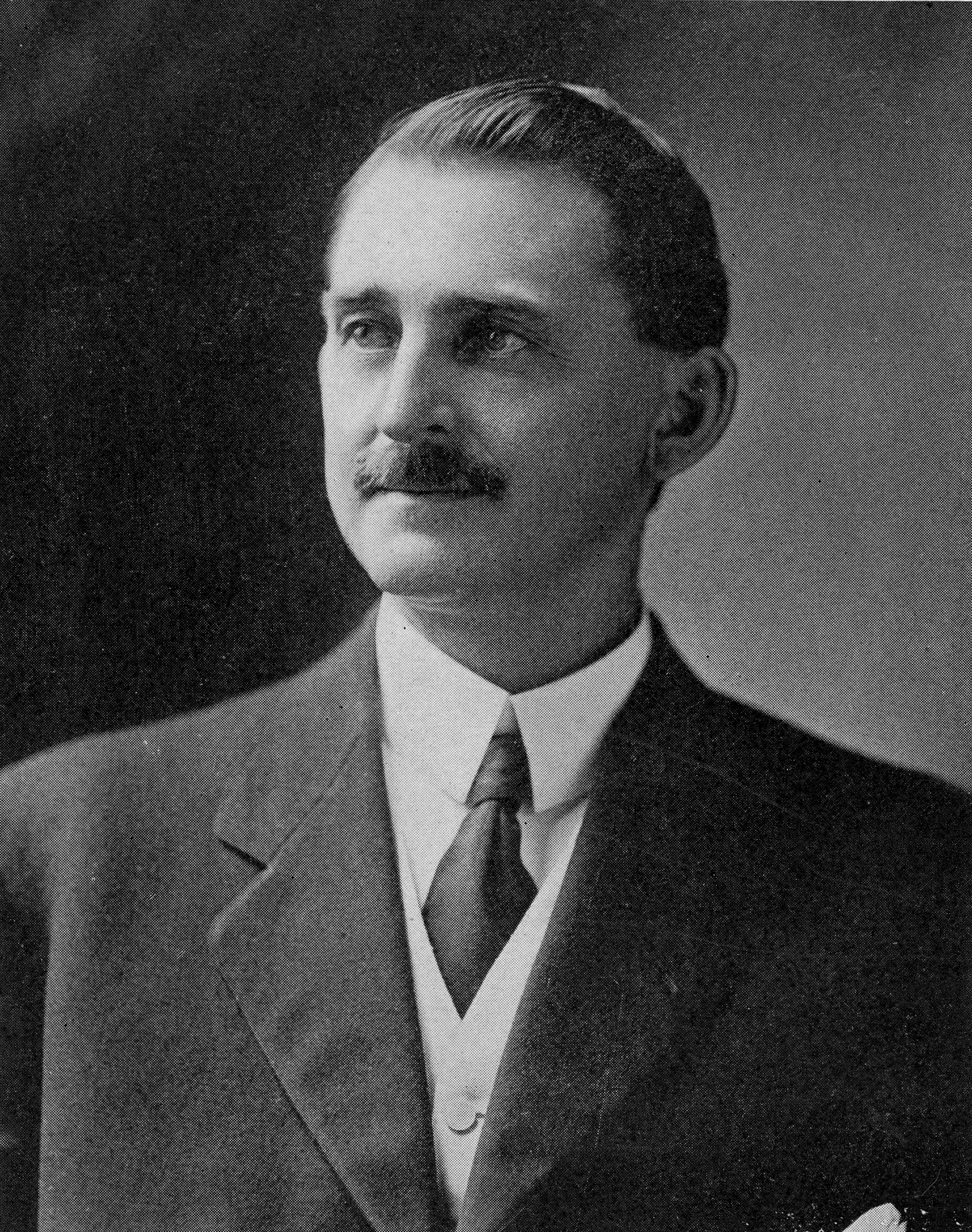
- Fout in 1909
- Born: October 18, 1861; Grant County, West Virginia, U.S.
- Died: December 4, 1947 (aged 86)
- Occupation: Missionary
- Known for: Assisting Armenian refugees

Henry Harness Fout (October 18, 1861 – December 4, 1947) was an author and a missionary for the Near East Foundation which aimed to assist Armenian refugees from the genocide who were dispersed throughout the Middle East. He was one of eighteen commission members returning to the United States from the Near East in 1919, when he reported on the massacre of Armenians.

Earlier, he had written The 1900 Pilgrimage to Egypt and the Holy Land after touring the Holy Land between 1899 and 1901.

== Early life and family ==
Fout was born on October 18, 1861, in Grant County, West Virginia to Henry and Susan Catharine Powell Fout. He graduated from Shenandoah Collegiate Institute in 1885 and Bonebrake Theological Seminary in 1890.

In 1900, he married Adah C. Fout and they had one daughter Lois Virginia Fout.

== Career ==
=== Preaching ===
Fout began preaching in 1885 and was ordained into the Ministry of the United Brethren in Christ in 1890. Subsequently, between 1891 and 1899, he served as Pastor of Oak Street Church in Dayton, Ohio and afterwards toured the Holy Land in 1899, returning in 1901. During this time, as presiding Elder and Miami conference superintendent, he wrote The 1900 Pilgrimage to Egypt and the Holy Land.

He was in charge of the United Brethren Church periodicals from 1901 to 1913 when he supervised Sunday school and became a bishop. In 1914, he was the bishop of the Northwest District.

=== Missionary ===
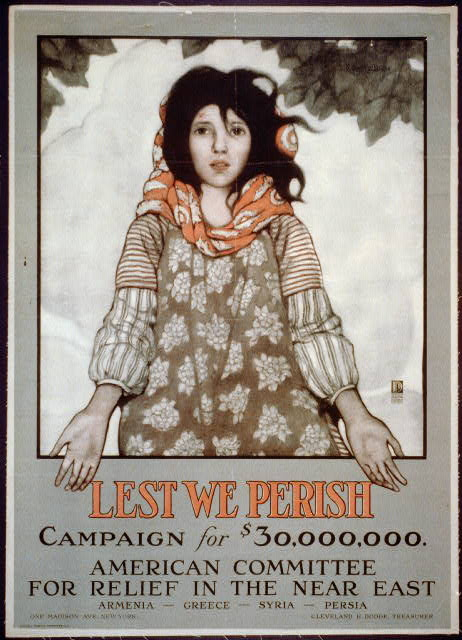
Lest we perish campaign poster of the American Committee for Relief in the Near East (ACRNE)

Fout became a missionary for the Near East Foundation which aimed to assist Armenian refugees from the genocide who were dispersed throughout the Middle East. He headed one section of this Commission in the relief and was one of its eighteen commission members returning to the United States from the Near East in 1919. During the stopover in Rome, he affirmed that a third of the Armenian nation had been executed and that those remaining were in a dreadful state and required immediate assistance from the United States. His message to America at the time was published in The New York Times.

Turkey by her inhuman treatment, in my opinion, has lost the right to be entrusted with authority to rule. From various estimates I have reached the conclusion that out of the Armenian nation of 3,000,000 at the outbreak of the war, 1,000,000 were massacred. The condition of the remainder is most appalling.

== Death ==
He died on December 4, 1947, and his grave is at Woodland Cemetery in Arboretum, Dayton, Montgomery County, Ohio, US.

== Selected publications ==
- The child and the church, Dayton, Ohio, Otterbein Press, 1913.
- The 1900 Pligrimage to Egypt and the Holy Land: Including Syria, Asia Minor, Greece, Italy, Switzerland, and France, Creative Media Partners, ISBN 9781376951455
- Our Heroes; Or United Brethren Home Missionaries, co-authored with W.M. Weekly, Otterbein Press, 1911, Volume 2
