= Ronche, Sacile =

Coordinates: 45°58′03″N 12°29′21″E

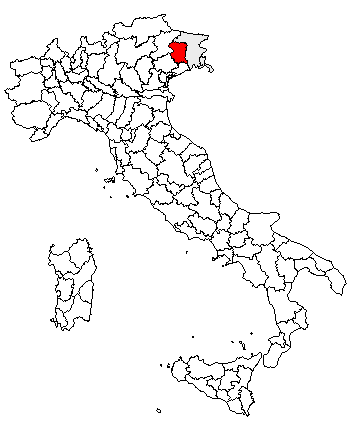
Location of the province of Pordenone

Ronche is a hamlet of about 70 people in the Friuli-Venezia Giulia region of north east Italy. It is a frazione of the comune of Sacile, in the province of Pordenone.

== Geography ==
It is located about 15 km east of the provincial capital of Pordenone.

The population

== Economy ==
The area is home to a number of United States nationals who work at the nearby Aviano Air Base. Brick-making started in Ronche in the fourteenth century and continued until 1957. Today the main economic activity is farming. The piano company of Fazioli is based in the area.

== Events ==
The Sagra delle brombolete, a festival dedicated to a variety of small yellow plum, is held on the third Sunday of July.
