= The Girl from the Other Side =

Japanese manga series by Nagabe

- The Girl from the Other Side: Siúil, a Rún
- First tankōbon volume cover, featuring Shiva (left) and Teacher (right)

とつくにの少女 (Totsukuni no Shōjo)
- Genre: Dark fantasy; Gothic; Mystery
- Manga
- Written by: Nagabe
- Published by: Mag Garden
- English publisher: NA: Seven Seas Entertainment
- Imprint: Blade Comics
- Magazine: Monthly Comic Garden
- Original run: September 6, 2015 – March 5, 2021
- Volumes: 11 + bonus
- Original video animation
- Directed by: Yūtarō Kubo; Satomi Maiya
- Produced by: Youko Ueda
- Written by: Yūtarō Kubo; Satomi Maiya
- Music by: Schroeder-Headz
- Studio: Wit Studio
- Licensed by: Crunchyroll
- Released: September 10, 2019
- Runtime: 10 minutes
- Original video animation
- Directed by: Yūtarō Kubo; Satomi Maiya
- Produced by: Naokado Fujiyama; Hitoshi Itō; Kyōhei Shinfuku
- Written by: Yūtarō Kubo; Satomi Maiya
- Music by: Schroeder-Headz
- Studio: Wit Studio
- Licensed by: Crunchyroll
- Released: March 10, 2022
- Runtime: 70 minutes
- icon

The Girl from the Other Side: Siúil, a Rún (とつくにの少女, Totsukuni no Shōjo; transl. "Foreign Girl"; the subtitle is the title of a traditional Irish song) is a Japanese manga series written and illustrated by Nagabe. It was serialized in Mag Garden's shōnen manga magazine Monthly Comic Garden from September 2015 to March 2021, with its chapters collected into eleven tankōbon volumes. The manga is licensed in North America by Seven Seas Entertainment.

A 10-minute original animation DVD (OAD) adaptation by Wit Studio was released with the limited edition of the manga's eighth volume in Japan in September 2019. A feature-length OAD, also by Wit Studio, was released with the manga's bonus volume in March 2022.

== Plot ==
In a medieval-like world where a destructive curse spreads by touch and turns people into black, skull-faced monsters called "Outsiders," the "inside" inhabited by people is shrinking every year. Merciless purges of people who are suspected to have been in contact by Outsiders are performed by the soldiers in service of the king, and their bodies are abandoned to the "outside." Shiva, a six-year-old girl, has been abandoned in the outside woods by an old woman she calls her "auntie." She is found by an Outsider who she starts to call "Teacher."

Teacher has been living in an abandoned house near an abandoned village for some years, and is different and more humanlike than the other Outsiders, even though he doesn't sleep or eat. The two start living as a makeshift family. However, Teacher can't recall his own past, and can't bring himself to tell Shiva – who every day cheerily waits for her auntie to come get her back – that she has been abandoned. The two can also never touch, as Teacher is afraid he'll spread the curse to Shiva.

There are also other Outsiders lurking in the forests who are interested in Shiva, call her "a soul" and would like to take her to their "mother" at the bottom of a lake. They are very different from Teacher, and make Teacher question everything he knows about the world. At the same time, soldiers from the Inside are also looking for Shiva, under ordination from their god of worship.

== Characters ==
Teacher (せんせ, Sense)
Voiced by: Jun Fukuyama (Japanese); Gary Furlong (English)
Shiva (シーヴァ, Shīva)
Voiced by: Rie Takahashi (Japanese); Sarah Wiedenheft (English)

== Media ==
=== Manga ===
The Girl from the Other Side: Siúil, a Rún was written and illustrated by Nagabe. It was serialized in Mag Garden's shōnen manga magazine Monthly Comic Garden, beginning in the October 2015 issue on September 6, 2015. It ended in the April 2021 issue on March 5, 2021. Mag Garden collected the chapters into eleven tankōbon (compiled volumes), published under its Blade Comics imprint from March 10, 2016, to April 9, 2021. A bonus manga volume was published on March 10, 2022. The manga was partly inspired by the French fairy tale Beauty and the Beast.

The series is licensed for an English-language release in North America by Seven Seas Entertainment. It is also licensed in France by Komikku Éditions, in Italy by J-Pop, in Spain by ECC Cómics, in Brazil by DarkSide Books, in Russia by Istari Comics, and in Ukraine by Molfar Comics.

No.	Original release date	Original ISBN	English release date	English ISBN
1	March 10, 2016	978-4-8000-0545-8	January 24, 2017	978-1-626924-67-3
2	September 10, 2016	978-4-8000-0612-7	May 16, 2017	978-1-626925-23-6
3	April 10, 2017	978-4-8000-0671-4	October 31, 2017	978-1-626925-58-8
4	October 10, 2017	978-4-8000-0720-9 (SE); 978-4-8000-0712-4 (LE)	March 13, 2018	978-1-626927-01-8
5	April 10, 2018	978-4-8000-0757-5 (SE); 978-4-8000-0746-9 (LE)	September 25, 2018	978-1-626928-47-3
6	October 10, 2018	978-4-8000-0801-5	March 12, 2019	978-1-642750-06-5
7	March 9, 2019	978-4-8000-0836-7 (SE); 978-4-8000-0811-4 (LE)	August 27, 2019	978-1-642751-16-1
8	September 10, 2019	978-4-8000-0891-6 (SE); 978-4-8000-0851-0 (LE)	March 17, 2020	978-1-64505-209-8
9	March 10, 2020	978-4-8000-0946-3	October 27, 2020	978-1-64505-517-4
10	September 10, 2020	978-4-8000-1011-7	April 13, 2021	978-1-64505-968-4
11	April 9, 2021	978-4-8000-1065-0	November 9, 2021	978-1-64827-309-4
Bonus	March 10, 2022	978-4-8000-1097-1	December 6, 2022	978-1-63858-725-5

=== Original animation DVDs ===
A 10-minute OVA adaptation was released with the limited edition of the manga's eighth volume in Japan on September 10, 2019. It was directed by Yūtarō Kubo and Satomi Maiya, and produced by Wit Studio, who "test[ed] a type of animation that uses a 'new expression technique'" in its creation. Prior to the OVA's release, the animated short premiered at the Fantasia International Film Festival in Montreal, Canada, on August 1, 2019. It was also screened at the Scotland Loves Anime Film Festival in Glasgow, Scotland, on October 12, 2019, and streamed online by the Japanese Film Festival and the JFF Plus Online Film Festival in various countries in December 2020.

On March 5, 2021, it was announced that Wit Studio would produce a new, feature-length OVA, to be released with a bonus volume of the manga on March 10, 2022. The staff members of the first OVA will return to reprise their roles. A Kickstarter campaign to raise funds for the project ran from March 10 to May 9, 2021. The campaign met its initial ¥3 million goal on the first day. It exceeded its ¥20 million stretch goal on the final day.

== Reception ==
=== Manga ===
The Girl from the Other Side: Siúil, a Rún won the "Shōnen Tournament 2017" by the editorial staff of the French website manga-news. It was ranked 20th at the third Next Manga Awards in the print category. It was nominated for the Best Comic award at the 45th Angoulême International Comics Festival in 2018. The first volume was included on the list of Great Graphic Novels for Teens selected by the American Library Association's YALSA division in 2018; the third, fourth, and fifth volumes were included on the same list in 2019.

=== Film ===
The feature-length film was nominated for the Feature Films Competition at the 9th New Chitose International Animation Film Festival in 2022. Additionally, the short-length film competed in the Films/Videos Made for Young Audiences category of the Ottawa International Animation Festival's digital event in 2020.
