= Medea (2022 American film) =

2022 film noir based on Euripides' play

Medea is a 2022 film adaptation of the ancient Greek tragedy Medea by Euripides. It was directed by Mariana Lewis and edited by Max Lewis. The film adopts a film noir style, and presented entirely in black and white. It was filmed using virtual sets created in Unreal Engine.

== Plot ==
Medea follows the story of Medea, a woman scorned by her husband Jason, who abandons her for another woman. Consumed by rage and betrayal, Medea seeks revenge against Jason, ultimately leading to a tragic and devastating conclusion.

== Cast ==
- Mariana Lewis as Medea
- Ciaran Barata-Hynes as Jason
- Harry Buckner as Creon
- Louise Devismes as Aegeus
- Elsa Mills as Glauce

== Production ==
Medea was filmed entirely using greenscreen technology and Unreal Engine virtual sets. According to Everton Duarte at Ultraverso Medea was filmed entirely using a mobile phone in a kitchen using green screen and received the award for Best Special Effects at Cusco WebFest 2023. According to ArteCult, the team used a free camera tracking application called CamtrackAR to place the actors in virtual sets. The film was nominated for Best Series, Best Production Design, and Best Special Effects at the LA Webfest. It also received the Best Editing Award at New Jersey Webfest.

== Soundtrack ==
The film features an original score by Quentin Lewis. Medea was awarded Best Soundtrack at LA Webfest 2022. Lewis was inspired by Bernard Herrmann seeking a 1950s feel.

== Reception ==
Medea has garnered critical acclaim for its innovative approach to storytelling and visual imagery. Mariana Lewis's direction has been praised for its boldness and creativity, while Max Lewis's editing set film's pacing and emotional impact. The film launched on streaming platforms in 2023. According to Revista360, Medea reached 4th place in the Webseries World Cup 2023. It received awards for Best British Series and Best Special Effects at British Web Awards 2023, and Best Director and Best Cinematography at the UK Online Webfest. The film ended the year 8th place in the Webseries World Cup 2023
