= Frau Faust =

Japanese manga series by Kotono Katō

- First volume cover

フラウ・ファウスト (Furau Fausuto)
- Genre: Dark fantasy
- Manga
- Written by: Kore Yamazaki
- Published by: Kodansha
- English publisher: NA: Kodansha USA
- Magazine: Itan
- Original run: October 7, 2014 – December 7, 2017
- Volumes: 5
- icon

Frau Faust (Japanese: フラウ・ファウスト, Hepburn: Furau Fausuto) is a Japanese manga series written and illustrated by Kore Yamazaki. It was serialized in Kodansha's josei manga magazine Itan from October 2014 to December 2017.

== Plot ==
Marion, a young boy, meets Johanna Faust, and asks her to be his teacher because his impoverished mother can no longer afford to send him to school. After their first meeting, he follows her in her quest to retrieve the parts of Mephistopheles, who had been cut in pieces by the Inquisition and sealed 100 years ago. Meanwhile, Lorenzo and his assistant Vico are hunting down Faust in order to prevent her to fulfill her quest.

== Publication ==
Written and illustrated by Kore Yamazaki, Frau Faust was serialized in Kodansha's josei manga magazine Itan from October 7, 2014, to December 7, 2017. Kodansha collected its chapters in five tankōbon volumes, released from April 7, 2015, to March 7, 2018.

In North America, the manga was licensed for English release by Kodansha USA. The five volumes were released from September 26, 2017, to November 6, 2018.

=== Volumes ===
No.	Original release date	Original ISBN	English release date	English ISBN
1	April 7, 2015	978-4-06-380755-4	September 26, 2017	978-1-63236-480-7 (print); 978-1-68233-875-9 (digital)
2	November 6, 2015	978-4-06-380814-8	November 14, 2017	978-1-63236-481-4 (print); 978-1-68233-953-4 (digital)
3	July 7, 2016	978-4-06-380863-6; 978-4-06-364988-8 (LE)	January 23, 2018	978-1-63236-549-1 (print); 978-1-64212-081-3 (digital)
4	June 7, 2017	978-4-06-380927-5; 978-4-06-362360-4 (LE)	March 6, 2018	978-1-63236-550-7 (print); 978-1-64212-116-2 (digital)
5	March 7, 2018; May 3, 2016 (LE)	978-4-06-511006-5; 978-4-06-511005-8 (LE)	November 6, 2018	978-1-63236-665-8 (print); 978-1-64212-525-2 (digital)

== Reception ==
In 2020, Frau Faust was one of the manga titles that ranked on the "Top 10 Graphic Novels for Teens" by the Young Adult Library Services Association (YALSA) of the American Library Association.
