= Entoria =

Figure in Roman Mythology

In Roman mythology, Entoria was the daughter of a Roman countryman. Saturn who was once hospitably received by him, became, by Entoria, the father of four sons: Janus, Hymnus, Faustus, and Felix.

Saturn taught the father the cultivation of the vine and the preparation of wine, enjoining him to teach his neighbours the same. This was done accordingly, but the country people, who became intoxicated with their new drink, thought it to be poison, and stoned their neighbour to death, whereupon his grandsons hanged themselves in their grief.

At a much later time, when the Romans were visited by a plague, they were told by the Delphic oracle, that the plague was a punishment for the outrage committed on Entoria's father, and Lutatius Catulus caused a temple to be erected to Cronos on the Tarpeian rock, and in it an altar with four faces.
