= Fust (band) =

American alternative country band

- Origin: Durham, North Carolina
- Genre: Alternative Country
- Years active: c. 2017–present
- Members: Aaron Dowdy; John Wallace; Avery Sullivan; Frank Meadows

Fust is an American alternative country band from Durham, North Carolina.

== History ==
Fust began as the musical project of Aaron Dowdy and his friends John Wallace, Avery Sullivan, and Frank Meadows. Dowdy began Fust by self-releasing EPs and eventually self-releasing an album titled Evil Joy.

In 2023, Fust released their second full-length album titled Genevieve, through Dear Life Records, with the singles "Violent Jubilee" and "Trouble".

In 2024, Fust released a compilation album titled Songs of the Rail, which is a collection of the band's demos from the years 2017–2018.

In 2025, Fust released their third studio album, Big Ugly, with the singles "Mountain Language", "Bleached", and "Spangled".

== Critical reception ==
Fust's 2023 album Genevieve was named by Pitchfork one of "9 New Albums You Should Listen To Now" and one of "24 Great Records You May Have Missed: Spring/Summer 2023".

In 2025, Fust received significant recognition from major national outlets. Time ranked the band’s album Big Ugly at number 9 on its list of the Best Albums of 2025. Individual songs by the band were also highlighted: NPR included “Spangled” among its “25 Best Songs of 2025” and later discussed the song again in a year-end roundup of favorite tracks, while The New York Times ranked “Jody” at number 20 on its list of the Best Songs of 2025. In addition to Time, Big Ugly was included at number 13 on Paste Magazine’s list of the 50 Best Albums of 2025. In the same year, Fust appeared on CBS Saturday Morning, performing multiple songs from Big Ugly.
