= Fausto Rossi (singer-songwriter) =

Italian singer-songwriter

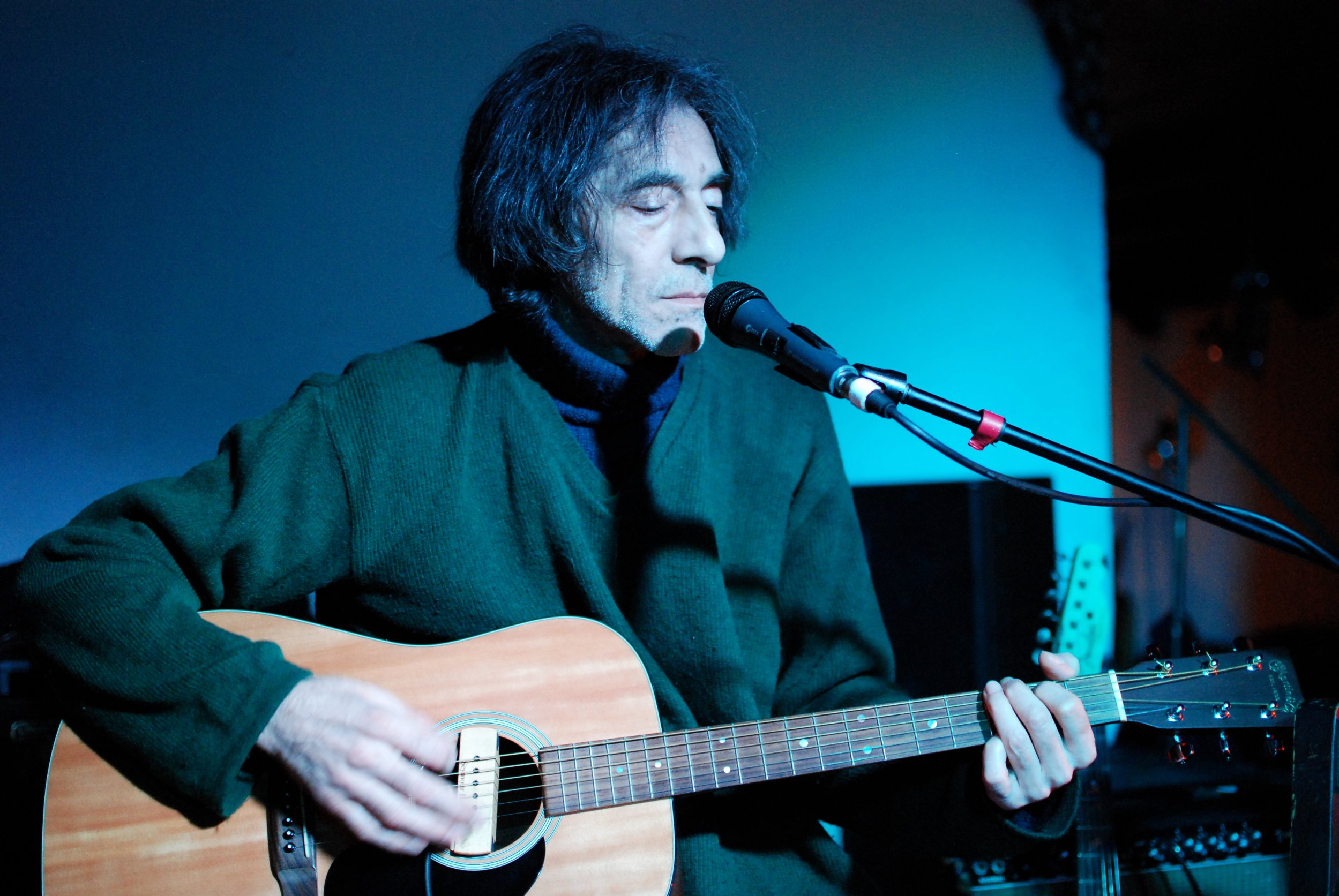
Fausto Rossi

Fausto Rossi (2 January 1954 in Sacile) is an Italian singer-songwriter.

== Discography ==
=== Album ===
==== As Faust'O ====
- 1978 – Suicidio (Record label: Ascolto, ASC 20041)
- 1979 – Poco zucchero (Ascolto, ASC 20127)
- 1980 – J'accuse, amore mio (Ascolto, ASC 20232)
- 1982 – Out now(Self Made)
- 1983 – Faust'O (Ricordi)
- 1985 – Love story (Target Music)

==== As Fausto Rossi ====
- 1992 – Cambiano le cose (Target Music)
- 1995 – L'erba (Target Music)
- 1996 – Lost and found (Target Music)
- 1997 – Exit (Target Music)
- 2009 – Becoming Visible (Interbeat Records)
- 2010 – Below the Line (Interbeat Records)
- 2012 – Blank times (Interbeat Records)
