= Fouts =

Fouts is a surname. Notable people with the surname include:

- Bob Fouts (1921–2019), American sports announcer
- Dan Fouts (born 1951), American football player and sports announcer
- Deborah Fouts, American anthropologist
- Denham Fouts (1914–1948), American socialite and male prostitute
- Dick Fouts (1933–2003), American player of Canadian football
- Jack Fouts (1925–2012), American football player and coach
- James R. Fouts (born 1942), American educator and mayor
- Montana Fouts (born 2000), American softball player
- Roger Fouts (born 1943), American primate researcher
- Theron J. Fouts (1893–1954), American football player and coach
- Tom Fouts (1918–2004), American writer
- William D. Fouts (1815–1865), U.S. Army officer

== See also ==
- Fout, another surname
