= SS Nordmark =

1920 German ship

History
- Name: Faust (1920-26); Nordmark (1926-36); Angeln (1936-44); Ermland (1944-45); Empire Congerstone (1945-47); Oakley (1947-53); Lucy (1953-60)
- Owner: H Dauelsberg (1920-26); Robert Bornhofen (1926-39); Preußenlinie Arlt & Co KG (1939-45); Ministry of War Transport (1945); Ministry of Transport (1945-47); Oakley Steamship Co (1947-49); Goodwin Steamship Co (1949-50); Anthony & Bainbridge Ltd (1950-53); Navigazione de Transportes San José (1953-60)
- Operator: H Dauelsberg (1920-26); R Bornhofen (1926-39); Ivers & Arlt (1936-45); T & C Wilton & Co Ltd (1945-47); Oakley Steamship Co (1947-49); Goodwin Steamship Co (1949-50); Anthony & Bainbridge Ltd (1950-53); Navigazione de Transportes San José (1953-60)
- Port of registry: (Weimar Republic) Bremen (1920-26); (Weimar Republic) Hamburg (1926-33); (Nazi Germany) Hamburg (1933-39); (Nazi Germany) Königsberg (1939-45); (United Kingdom) London (1945-53); (Costa Rica) San José (1953-60)
- Builder: Schiffbau-Gesellschaft Unterweser AG
- Yard number: 151
- Launched: 29 December 1920
- Identification: Code Letters QLGN (1920-34); Code Letters DHRX (1934-45); Code Letters GMRD (1945-53); United Kingdom Official Number 180665 (1945-53)
- Fate: Scrapped

General characteristics
- Class & type: Coaster
- Tonnage: 987 GRT; 568 NRT
- Length: 215 ft 5 in (65.66 m)
- Beam: 34 ft 2 in (10.41 m)
- Depth: 13 ft 6 in (4.11 m)
- Installed power: Triple expansion steam engine
- Propulsion: Screw propeller

Nordmark was a 987 GRT Coaster that was built as Faust in 1920 by Schiffbau-Gesellschaft Unterweser AG, Bremen, Germany for German owners. She was renamed Nordmark after a sale in 1930 and was again renamed Angeln in 1936. She was sold in 1944 and renamed Ermland. She was seized by the Allies at Lübeck in May 1945, passed to the Ministry of War Transport (MoWT) and renamed Empire Congerstone. In 1947, she was sold into merchant service and renamed Oakley. In 1953, she was sold to Costa Rica and renamed Lucy. She served until 1960 when she was scrapped.

== Description ==
The ship was built in 1920 as yard number 151 by Schiffbau-Gesellschaft Unterweser, Bremen.

The ship was 215 feet 5 inches (65.66 m) long, with a beam of 34 feet 2 inches (10.41 m) a depth of 13 feet 6 inches (4.11 m). She had a GRT of 987 and a NRT of 568.

The ship was propelled by a triple expansion steam engine, which had cylinders of 16 3/16 inches (41.1 cm), 26 inches (66 cm) and 34 1/5 inches (87 cm) diameter by 25 3/5 inches (65 cm) stroke. The engine was built by A Borsig, Tegel.

== History ==
Faust was built for H Dauelsburg, Bremen. In 1930, she was sold to Robert Bornhofen, Hamburg and was renamed Nordmark. Her port of registry was Hamburg and she used the Code Letters QLGN. On 17 November 1931, Nordmark was in collision with the Union-Castle Line's Llandaff Castle in the River Thames. In 1934, her Code Letters were changed to DHRX. In 1936, Nordmark was one of 20 ships chartered to transport timber from Leningrad, Soviet Union to Germany. In 1939, she was sold to Preußenlinie Arlt & Co KG, Kiel. She was placed under the management of Ivers & Arlt. Her port of registry was changed to Königsberg. In 1944, she was renamed Ermland.

In May 1945, Ermland was seized by the Allies at Lübeck. She was passed to the MoWT and renamed Empire Congerstone. Her port of registry was London. She was placed under the management of T & C Wilson & Co Ltd. The Code Letters GMRD and United Kingdom Official Number 180665 were allocated. In 1947, Empire Congerstone was sold the Oakley Steamship Company, London and was renamed Oakley. In 1949, she was sold to the Goodwin Steamship Company, London and then to Anthony & Bainbridge Ltd in 1950. In 1953, Oakley was sold to Navigazione de Transportes San José, San José, Costa Rica and was renamed Lucy. She served until 1960 when she was scrapped.
