= George Wada =

Japanese anime producer

- 和田 丈嗣
- Born: Jōji Wada; 1978 (age 47–48)
- Occupation: Anime producer
- Employer(s): Production I.G; Wit Studio

Jōji "George" Wada (和田 丈嗣, Wada Jōji; born 1978) is a Japanese anime producer at Production I.G and the president of IG Port subsidiary Wit Studio. He is known for his work on the series Guilty Crown, Attack on Titan, and Psycho Pass. In 2020 Wada was appointed as Executive Vice President of Production I.G.
