= Prometheus (disambiguation) =

Prometheus is a figure in Greek mythology.

Prometheus may also refer to:

== Astronomy and spaceflight ==
- Prometheus (moon), a moon of Saturn
- Prometheus (volcano), on Io
- 1809 Prometheus, an asteroid
- Prometheus (rocket engine), a reusable rocket engine under development by the European Space Agency
- Prometheus (spacecraft), a proposed spacecraft by Orbital Sciences Corporation
- Project Prometheus, NASA's nuclear propulsion program
- Prometheus (missile system), a Russian surface-to-air missile/anti-ballistic missile system

== Film and television ==
- Prometheus, a 1965 film by Vlado Kristl
- Prometheus (1998 film), a film-poem by Tony Harrison
- Prometheus (2012 film), an alien science fiction film by Ridley Scott featuring the fictional starship USCSS Prometheus
- Prometheus: War of Fire, a 2019 South Korean television series featuring Ki Hong Lee
- Prometheus (Stargate), a fictional spacecraft from the Stargate franchise
- Prometheus, a fictional experimental aircraft in The Sound Barrier
- USS Prometheus, a fictional spacecraft in the episode "Message in a Bottle" of Star Trek: Voyager
- USS Prometheus, a fictional starship in the episode "Second Sight" of Star Trek: Deep Space Nine
- Prometheus CVS-101, a fictional super-carrier from Macross and Robotech
- Prometheus, a fictional steam ship from 1899
- "Promortyus", a 2019 episode of the fourth season of Rick and Morty

== Gaming ==
- Robo or Prometheus, a Chrono Trigger character
- Prometheus, a The Conduit character
- Prometheus, a Mega Man ZX character
- PROMETHEUS, a series of battle droids in TimeSplitters: Future Perfect
- Prometheus, a Starsiege character, leader of the Cybrid Faction

== Literature ==
- "Prometheus" (short story), by Franz Kafka
- "Prometheus" (Goethe), a poem by Goethe
- Prometheus (DC Comics), several DC Comics supervillains
- Prometheus (Marvel Comics), a superhero
- Prometheus Award, an award for libertarian science fiction
- "Prometheus", an 1816 poem by Lord Byron
- "Prometheus", an 1832 poem by Thomas Kibble Hervey
- Prometheus, a series in the Appleseed franchise
- Prometheus, a character in Anthem, a novella by Ayn Rand

== Music ==
- "Prometheus" (art song), an 1819 song by Franz Schubert
- "Prometheus" (Liszt), an 1850 symphonic poem
- Prometheus (Wagner-Régeny), an opera by Rudolf Wagner-Régeny
- Prometheus (Orff), a 1968 opera by Carl Orff
- Prometheus (musician) or Benji Vaughan, British psychedelic trance musician
- Prometheus (soundtrack), from the 2012 film
- "Prometheus: The Poem of Fire", a 1910 orchestral poem by Alexander Scriabin
- Prometheus: The Discipline of Fire & Demise, an album by Emperor
- "Prometheus, Symphonia Ignis Divinus", an album by Luca Turilli's Rhapsody
- Prometheus chord, a chord from Scriabin's harmonic language
- "Prometheus", a 2013 song by Erra from Augment
- "Prometheus", a 2015 song by Crystal Lake from The Sign

== Organizations ==
- Prometheus Books
- Prometheus Camp, a Finnish summer camp
- Prometheus Entertainment
- Prometheus Film or Mezhrabpomfilm
- Prometheus Fuels
- Prometheus Global Media
- Prometheus Institute
- Prometheus Products, a defunct American modem and sound card manufacturer
- Prometheus Radio Project

== Transportation ==
- HMS Prometheus (1898), a Pelorus-class protected cruiser
- USS Prometheus (1814), a brig in the US Navy
- USS Prometheus (AR-3), a repair ship that served during World War I and World War II
- Prometheus, a GWR Iron Duke Class locomotive (1850–1887)
- Prometheus, a GWR 3031 Class locomotive (1891–1915)
- Prometheus, a British Rail Class 76 (EM1) locomotive
- Eureka PROMETHEUS Project, a research project on driverless cars
- EFF Prometheus, a motor glider (1970s)

== Visual arts ==
- Prometheus (Manship), a sculpture in New York City
- Prometheus (Orozco), a fresco mural in Claremont, California
- Prometheus (Zach), a cast-iron sculpture by Jan Zach in Eugene, Oregon
- Prometheus, a bas-relief by Yuri Bosco in Tolyatti

== Other uses ==
- Prometheus (moth), a genus of moths in the family Castniidae
- Prometheus (software), a monitoring system with a time series database
- Prometheus (tree), one of the oldest known trees

== See also ==
- American Prometheus: The Triumph and Tragedy of J. Robert Oppenheimer, biography by Kai Bird and Martin J. Sherwin
- Prometeo (magazine), Spanish avant-garde magazine
- The Creatures of Prometheus, an 1801 ballet score by Beethoven
- Frankenstein; or, The Modern Prometheus, an 1818 novel by Mary Shelley
- HMS Prometheus, a list of ships
- Mayo v. Prometheus, an important case in US patent law
- "The Post-Modern Prometheus", the 1997 X-Files season 5 episode 5
- Promethea, a comic book series
- Promethea, a planet in Borderlands
- Promethean (disambiguation)
- Prométhée (Fauré), a 1910 opera by Gabriel Fauré
- French submarine Prométhée (1930), a submarine of the French Navy
- Preference ranking organization method for enrichment evaluation (PROMETHEE)
- Prometheia, a 5th-century B.C. trilogy of plays by Aeschylus
- Prometheism, a Polish political project
- Prometheus Bound, a play traditionally attributed to Aeschylus
- Prometheus II, a Greek resistance organization during World War II
- Prometheus Unbound (disambiguation)
- Promethium (disambiguation)
- USS Prometheus, a list of ships
