= Appleseed =

Appleseed may refer to:

- The seed of an apple
- Johnny Appleseed (1774–1845), American pioneer nurseryman and missionary
- Appleseed (EP), by Aesop Rock
- Appleseed, a 2001 novel by John Clute
- Appleseed, a 2021 novel written by Matt Bell
- The Apple Seed, a storytelling radio show on BYU radio
- Johnny Appleseed's, a retailer of clothes for women since 1946, Nancy Talbot was a franchisee

== Organizations ==
- Appleseed Foundation, a non-profit network of social justice centers
- Project Appleseed, a rifle marksmanship clinic
- Appleseed Recordings, a record label

== Manga and spin-offs ==
- Appleseed (manga), written and illustrated by Masamune Shirow
  - Appleseed (1988 film), a 1988 original video animation based on the manga
  - Appleseed (2004 film), a 2004 film
    - Appleseed EX, a February 2007 video game adaptation of the film
    - Appleseed Ex Machina, an October 2007 film sequel to the 2004 film
  - Appleseed XIII, a 2011 CGI anime television series
  - Appleseed Alpha, a 2014 film
