= Briareos Hecatonchires =

Briareos (Hecatonchires Cyborg System)
- Appleseed character
- Briareos carrying Deunan Knute on the poster for the 2004 Appleseed film
- First appearance: 15 February 1985
- Created by: Masamune Shirow

In-universe information
- Species: Cyborg
- Gender: Male
- Occupation: ESWAT

Briareos (Japanese: ブリアレオス, Hepburn: Buriareosu) [Hecatonchires Cyborg System] (ヘカトンケイレス, Hekatonkeiresu) is a character from Masamune Shirow's Appleseed manga and its adaptations in anime. He is one of the two protagonists of the series, along with his point man, Deunan Knute. Briareos and Knute are trained ESWAT officers. They met in Knute's father's SWAT unit before World War III broke out. Briareos and Deunan are also lovers and have been involved since before the war. Since moving to Olympus with Deunan, they have joined the ESWAT unit (Extra Special Weapons And Tactics). He is named after Briareus the Vigorous, one of the Hecatonchires (hundred-armed giants) of Greek mythology. In the Japanese media, he is voiced by Yoshisada Sakaguchi in the Appleseed OVA, Jūrōta Kosugi in the Appleseed film, Kōichi Yamadera in Appleseed Ex Machina and Appleseed XIII, and Junichi Suwabe in Appleseed Alpha. In the English dub, he is voiced by William Roberts in the OVA, Jamieson Price in the first dub of the 2004 film, and David Matranga in all subsequent productions.

== Background ==
Originally from the Mediterranean, Briareos was used as a terrorist by the KGB while still a child. He sought political asylum in the former USA after killing the unit's commander of operations - for which he was put on the international "most wanted" list as an assassin. After meeting an agent from Special Security Forces, he began operating as a partner with the man's daughter, Deunan Knute. Caught in an explosion, the 31-year-old survived only by undergoing a full cyborg body replacement - and has been making modifications ever since.

== Cybernetics ==
Briareos is a prime example of the technology of cybernetic implants in Appleseed. Although his body is almost completely artificial, he suffers little loss in humanity. His outer skin is elastic, capable of feeling sensation, and the temperature can be adjusted to the cyborg's preferences. He has eight eyes mounted on his head, four in his face (the large sensor in the middle is actually his nose) two at the bases of his "rabbit ear" sensors facing rearward, and two at the tips, which allow him to safely look around corners. His human brain is augmented by an auxiliary "brain" that acts as an information processor, and is capable of handling information in a conceptual format rather than hard numerical data. His cybernetics controller, the Hecatonchires system, is named after the same 100 handed giants from Greek mythology. It is capable of controlling dozens of limbs or other cyborg bodies independently from one another, with no additional strain on the user. In the manga, it is pointed out that a cyborg equipped with the Hecatonchires system is able to fully control an entire aircraft carrier on his own. This ability to process multiple limbs at once is seen in the film when he is seen using one rifle in his Landmate's arms, and another in the control arms.

== Legacy ==
Director Neill Blomkamp has cited Briareos as an influence on the design of the eponymous character in his 2015 film, Chappie.
