= Tetsuya Takahashi (composer) =

Japanese composer

- 高橋 哲也
- Occupations: Composer; arranger

Tetsuya Takahashi (高橋 哲也 Takahashi Tetsuya) is a Japanese composer.

== Works ==
- Appleseed (2004)
- House of Himiko (2005) – [Tracks: "Rainbow Soldier" and "Songs My Mother Taught Me"]
- Atagoal (2006 – CG adaptation)
- Appleseed Ex Machina (2007) – [CD2]
- Resident Evil: Degeneration (2008)
- Viper's Creed (2009)
- Marvel Anime (2010–2011)
- Dragon Age: Dawn of the Seeker (2012)
- Starship Troopers: Invasion (2012)
- Space Pirate Captain Harlock (2013)
- Pac-Man and the Ghostly Adventures (2013)
- Appleseed Alpha (2015)
- Marvel Future Avengers (2017–2018)
- Kemurikusa (2019)
- Saving 80,000 Gold in Another World for My Retirement (2023)
- Rick and Morty: The Anime (2024)
