= Chris Hutchison =

American actor

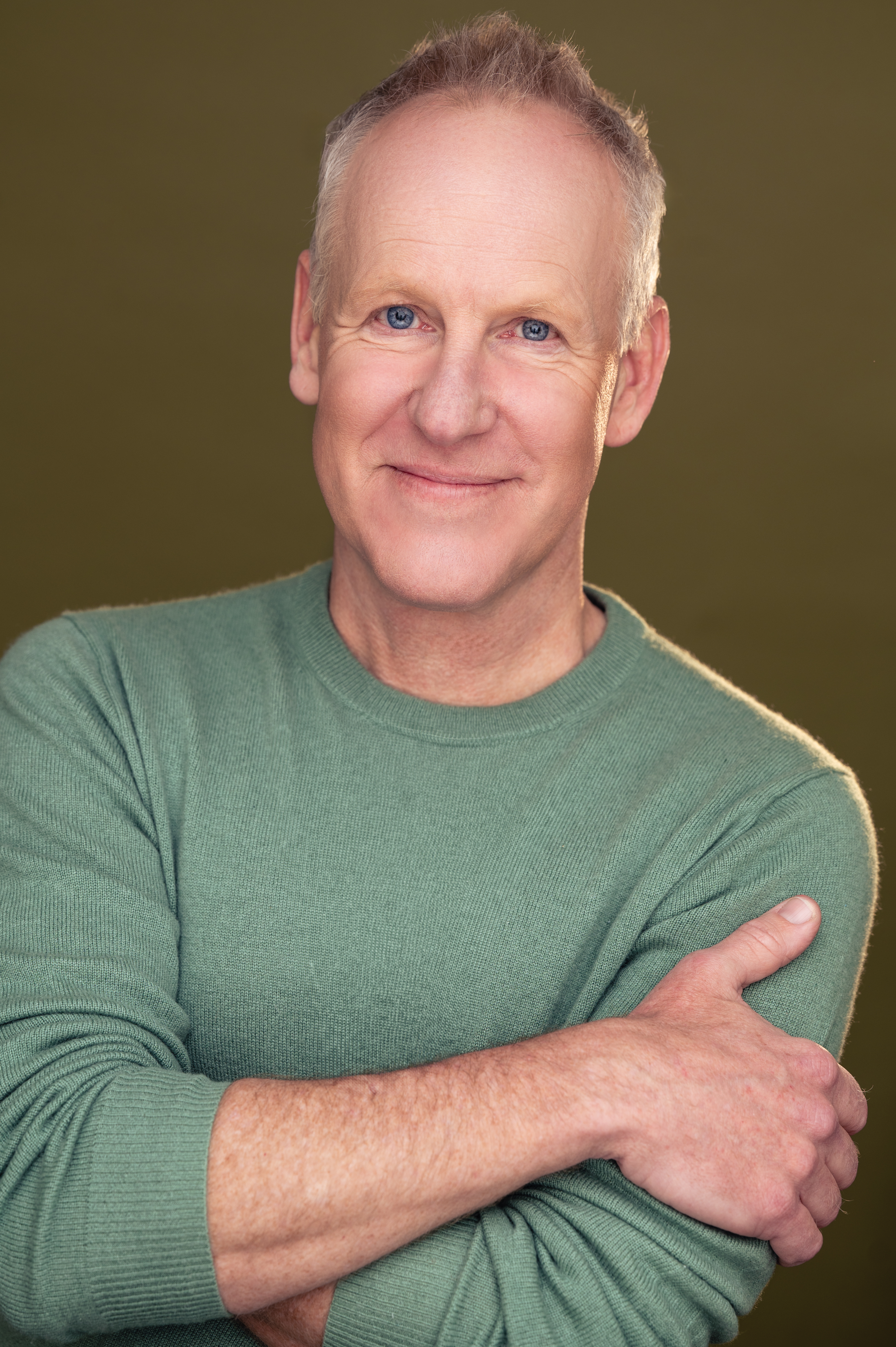
Chris Hutchison in 2025

Chris Hutchison is an American stage and voice actor. The 2025–26 season was his 20th year as a company member at the Alley Theatre in Houston.

== Career ==
Hutchison holds a B.A. in English from Lafayette College, where he sometimes teaches, and an M.F.A. from the University of Washington. He also teaches acting at the University of Houston.

== Theater ==
=== Off Broadway ===
- The Second Man (2000)(Keen Company)
- Museum (2002) (Keen Company)
- The Hasty Heart (2004) (Keen Company)

=== Alley Theatre ===
During his twenty years at Alley Theatre, Hutchison has performed in over 100 productions as a member of the Resident Acting Company, including A Behanding in Spokane (Mervyn), Mauritius (Dennis), The Lieutenant of Inishmore (Padraic), Death on the Nile (Simon Mostyn), Subject to Fits (Ippolit), Proof (Hal), A Christmas Carol (Bob Cratchit and Bob Marley), the world premiere of Agatha Christie's The Mirror Crack'd.

== Filmography ==
=== Live action ===
- Kill the Poor (2003) (Joel)
- Ed, episode "Charity Cases" (2001) (Bruce Kapler)

=== Anime ===
Hutchison also does voice-over. He mostly appears in anime titles for ADV Films and Seraphim Digital/Sentai Filmworks.

- Angel Beats! – Fishing Sato (Ep. 7), Naoi's Father (Ep. 6), Vice-Principal
- Appleseed – Lance (Sentai Dub)
- Appleseed Ex Machina – Lance
- Appleseed Alpha – Matthews
- Broken Blade – Bades, Hekella
- Le Chevalier D'Eon – Bestuzhev
- Clannad – Naoyuki Okazaki
- Devil May Cry: The Animated Series – Kerry (Ep. 7)
- Dog & Scissors – Afro Gomez
- Farming Life in Another World – Galgardo
- Ghost Hound – Genma Saruta
- Guin Saga – Marus, Scaal
- Halo Legends – ONI Commander (Prototype)
- Hiiro no Kakera – Eins
- Horizon in the Middle of Nowhere – Kenji Ito, Narrator
- Kiba – Bakkam
- Legends of the Dark King – Gaoh
- Needless – Kafka (Ep. 16), Nishimura (Ep. 17), Seiichi Obito
- No. 6 – Rikiga
- Red Garden – Kate's Father
- Un-Go – Ittou Ono (Ep. 1), Yajima (Ep. 6, 9)
- Vinland Saga – Gorm
- Xam'd: Lost Memories – Tojiro Kagisu

== Personal ==
Hutchison's brother, Brian Hutchison, is also an actor. Hutchison is married to fellow Alley Theatre Resident Acting Company member Elizabeth Bunch and has 2 children.
