= Appleseed (2004 film) =

2004 animated feature film directed by Shinji Aramaki

- Theatrical release poster

Japanese name
- Kana: アップルシード
Transcriptions
- Revised Hepburn: Appurushīdo
- Directed by: Shinji Aramaki
- Screenplay by: Haruka Handa; Tsutomu Kamishiro
- Based on: Appleseed by Masamune Shirow
- Produced by: Hidenori Ueki; Naoko Watanabe
- Starring: Ai Kobayashi; Jūrōta Kosugi; Yuki Matsuoka
- Music by: Boom Boom Satellites; Tetsuya Takahashi
- Production company: Digital Frontier
- Distributed by: Toho
- Release date: April 17, 2004 (Japan)
- Running time: 103 minutes
- Country: Japan
- Language: Japanese
- Budget: ¥100 million
- Box office: $1.6 million (Worldwide)

Appleseed (Japanese: アップルシード, Hepburn: Appurushīdo) is a 2004 Japanese animated post-apocalyptic action film directed by Shinji Aramaki and based on the Appleseed manga created by Masamune Shirow. The voice cast includes Ai Kobayashi, Jūrōta Kosugi, and Yuki Matsuoka. The film, the second adaptation of the manga after the 1988 OVA, tells the story of Deunan Knute, a former soldier, who searches for data that can restore the reproductive capabilities of bioroids, a race of genetically engineered clones. Although it shares characters and settings with the original manga, this film's storyline is a re-interpretation, not a direct adaptation. It was released on April 17, 2004.

== Plot ==
Deunan Knute, a young soldier and one of the Global War's last survivors, is rescued by Hitomi, a Second Generation Bioroid. Knute's escape attempt is stopped by her former lover Briareos Hecatonchires, now a cyborg. She realizes that the war had ended and she is in a Technocratic Utopian city called Olympus. Its population is half-human and half-clone, a genetically-engineered species called Bioroids. Olympus is governed by three factions: Prime Minister Athena Areios; General Edward Uranus III, head of the Olympus Army; and a Council of Elders. Everything in the city is observed and administered by an synthetic technocrat named Gaia from a building called Tartaros. While there, Deunan joins the counter-terrorism organization ESWAT.

The Bioroids were created from the DNA of Deunan's late father, Carl, making the Second Generation Bioroids her brothers and sisters. However, they have a much shorter lifespan than humans due to suppressed reproductive capabilities. The Bioroid's life extension facilities are destroyed by a secret faction of the Regular Army in a terrorist attack against the Bioroids. However, the Appleseed data, which contains information on restoring the Bioroids reproduction capabilities, still exists.

Olympus is plagued by conflicting factions. Along with a strike force, Deunan and Briareos head to the building where the Bioroids were originally created. She activates a holographic recording showing the location of the Appleseed data. Dr. Gilliam Knute, who created the Bioroids and revealed to be Deunan's late mother, entrusted Appleseed to Deunan, but was inadvertently killed by a soldier when Deunan was a child. After mourning her death, Leyton turns against his men. They then get cornered by the Regular Army. Deunan discovers from anti-Bioroid terrorist Colonel Hades that Briareos had intentionally allowed his Landmate, a large exoskeleton-like battlesuit, to escape. Kudoh then sacrifices himself to get Deunan and Briareos out of harm's way and escape to the rooftop. Uranus attempts to convince Deunan that Bioroids seek to control humanity, and he wants to destroy Appleseed and the D-Tank containing the Bioroid reproductive activation mechanism. Briareos tells Uranus that the Elders manipulated the Army into wanting to destroy the D-Tank, but Athena is trying to prevent them from doing so and protect humanity. Hades, who resents Carl, wounds Briareos. She and Briareos flee into the sea, killing Hades in the process. Despite Deunan's pleas not to leave Briareos behind, he persuades her to search for the Elders. Mechanic Yoshitsune Miyamoto arrives in his Landmate and begins repairing Briareos after receiving an SOS from him. Deunan flies back to Olympus in Yoshitsune's Landmate and uses the Appleseed data to fully restore Bioroid reproductive functions.

As Deunan encounters the Council of Elders, they reveal their involvement in Gilliam's death and also plan to use the D-tank virus to sterilize humans, which will leave the Bioroids the new rulers of Earth. They needed the Appleseed data to keep the Bioroids alive, but Gilliam hid the data so they could not move forward with their plan. Athena, stepping in to stop them and announcing that Uranus has surrendered, tells Deunan that the Elders had been acting on their own and had shut Gaia down once they realized humanity had softened their stance against Bioroids. The Elders state that they will soon die since Gaia kept them alive, but that they were ready to sacrifice themselves. ESWAT begins mobilizing, but suffer heavy casualties due to the fortresses' heavy weaponry.

Briareos arrives and asks Deunan to join the battle. Despite the Elders' objections, she goes with him to the seventh tower, and attempts to enter the password to shut the defenses down, but a malfunction makes it difficult. The final password letter appears by itself, and Deunan secures the D-Tank, shutting down the towers.

== Cast ==
Role	Japanese	English	
Role	Japanese	Animaze (2005)	Seraphim Digital (2010)
Deunan Knute	Ai Kobayashi	Jessica Straus	Luci Christian
Briareos Hecatonchires	Juurouta Kosugi	Jamieson Price	David Matranga
Athena Areios	Mami Koyama	Carolyn Hennesy	Allison Sumrall
Nike	Miho Yamada	Cindy Robinson	Shelley Calene-Black
Hitomi	Yuki Matsuoka	Karen Strassman	Hilary Haag
Yoshitsune Miyamoto	Toshiyuki Morikawa	Dave Wittenberg	Chris Patton
Edward Uranus III	Yuzuru Fujimoto	Michael McConnohie	Jason Douglas
Colonel Hades	Takehito Koyasu	Skip Stellrecht	Andrew Love
Kudou	Tadahisa Saizen	Skip Stellrecht	Kalob Martinez
Dr. Gilliam Knute	Emi Shinohara	Karen Strassman	Kara Greenberg
Seven Elders	Fumio Matsuoka; Hirotake Nagata; Ikuo Nishikawa; Ryuuji Nakagi; Takehiro Koyama; Toshihiko Kuwagai; Yoshiyuki Kaneko	Doug Stone; Kim Strauss; Michael Forest; Michael Sorich; Mike Reynolds; William Bassett; William Knight	Andy McAvin; Christopher Ayres; John Gremillion; Marty Fleck; Stefan Craig; T. Posthlewaite; Ted Pfister

== Music ==
The original soundtrack and music to the series features an electronic, techno and trance theme, with the likes of Paul Oakenfold, Basement Jaxx, Boom Boom Satellites, Akufen, Carl Craig, T. Raumschmiere and Ryuuichi Sakamoto handling the music.

== Release history ==
The film was released in theaters on April 17, 2004, in Japan. On January 14, 2005, Geneon Entertainment released the film in 30 theaters. It was later released on DVD on May 10, 2005, but with Toho's and Geneon's name and logo removed from the credits and trailer respectively. Geneon Entertainment's North American division was shut down in December 2007. This allowed the film to be picked up by Sentai Filmworks, with distribution from ADV Films, who re-released it on DVD July 1, 2009. Sentai Filmworks, along with Section23 Films, released Appleseed on Blu-ray Disc on May 18, 2010. The Blu-ray edition of the film includes the original Animaze English dub and an updated dub produced by Seraphim Digital, which features most of the cast from Appleseed Ex Machina. The movie was rereleased in a Blu-ray/DVD set on September 8, 2015, under the Sentai Selects label.

== Reception ==
On the review aggregator website Rotten Tomatoes, 25% of 32 critic reviews are positive, and the average rating is 4.7/10. The critic consensus on the website states, "While visually arresting, Appleseed's narrative and dialogue pondering existentialism is ponderous, awkward, and clumsy."

IGN gave the film 7 out of 10, commenting that the film is more fun, beautiful and much better than the 1988 film. Anime News Network's Carlo Santos said while the plot is overly generic storytelling, the visual presentation and musical score both stand out and give the film its worth. Helen McCarthy in 500 Essential Anime Movies noted the use of shading and motion capture in the film, stating that "as good as the technology is, the script doesn't match the 1988 version". Yahoo! Japan ranks the film with a 3.16 star.

== Sequels and prequel ==
Director Shinji Aramaki also directed the sequel, titled Appleseed Ex Machina, which was released on October 19, 2007, in Japan. The film once again featured animated computer-generated imagery, although the cel shaded style was abandoned. On July 22, 2014, an indirect prequel titled Appleseed Alpha was released on Blu-ray and DVD after a digital release on July 15, 2014.

== Aftermath and influence ==
Appleseed (2004) was described by Mark Schilling (The Japan Times) as "innovative use of out-of-the-box animation software to create Hollywood-style effects at a tiny fraction of Hollywood budgets." This statement was echoed by Studio Ghibli president Toshio Suzuki who stated that Appleseed would revolutionise the animation business.

== Video game ==
A video game adaption based on the film was released as Appleseed EX by Sega, developed by Dream Factory for the PlayStation 2 in February 2007. This game was strongly panned by Famitsu magazine who gave it 14 out of 40.
