= Jamieson Price =

American voice actor

- Other name: Taylor Henry
- Education: College of William and Mary (BA); California State University at Long Beach (MFA)
- Occupation: Actor
- Years active: 1981–present
- Spouse: Bethany Price (m. 1993)
- Children: 3

Jamieson K. Price is an American actor, best known for his deep and booming voice in numerous anime and video game projects. He is known as the voice of the Count of Monte Cristo in Gankutsuou, Sojiro Sakura in Persona 5, Ovan in .hack//G.U., and Galbalan, and Milton Grimm from Ever After High. Price also had a part in the 2000 movie The Patriot. He portrays Dark Mayhem in The Thundermans.

== Biography ==
Price became interested in acting as a young child, starting from when he was in the fourth grade and later did theatre performances even during his adolescent and young adult years. In high school, Price got involved with dramatic interpretations-(focusing on poetry and prose reading) as well as voice competitions in his teens and became Virginia State Champion in his senior year of high school which later lead him to get into acting and voice acting by a close friend of his during the late 90s after graduate school. He eventually got a job in the voice acting business by Dorothy Fahn, who is a friend of his wife Bethany who was very interested in his deep voice; aside from acting/voice acting, he has also done work for fight choreography as well as a theatrical technician.

== Personal life ==
Price has been married to his wife Bethany Price since December 31, 1993, who works as a director, audition/stage coach, and an acting instructor. He has three children (2 daughters and 1 son); Dane (an actor and musician), Cynthia (an actress and dancer), and Meghan (a chiropractor). Price is also involved with a few podcasts, one of them being Crypto-Z.

== Filmography ==
=== Anime ===
List of dubbing performances in anime
Year	Title	Role	Notes	Source
1995	El-Hazard	Chabil		
1996	Rurouni Kenshin	Uonuma Usui, Jinpu, Kaiou		
1998	Vampire Princess Miyu	Kijutsushi		
1999	The Big O	Big Ear		
1999	Battle Athletes Victory	CEO, Additional voices		
1999	Saber Marionette J Again	Gerhard von Faust		
2000	Digimon Adventure 02	Yukio Oikawa		
2000	Argento Soma	General Kilgore, Chairman, Control Tower, Government Man 1		
2000	Tsukikage Ran	Kojuro Takagaki		
2000	Shinzo	Narrator		
2000	Mon Colle Knights	Professor Hiragi		
2000	Cowboy Bebop	Gordon, additional voices		
2000	Flint the Time Detective	Miyamoto Musashi		
2000	Mezzo Forte	Bodyguard B, Hirooka		
2000	Puppet Princess	Guards, Hisashige, Ninja Leader, Soldiers		
2001	Geneshaft	Lord Sergei Sneak IV		
2001	Digimon Tamers	Janyu Wong/Tao, Baronmon (Movie 1)		
2001	s-CRY-ed	Martin Jigmar		
2001	Vandread	Rabat		
2001	Arc the Lad	Zarbado		
2001	X	Kusanagi Shiyū		
2002	Digimon Frontier	Seraphimon, Skullsatamon		
2002	.hack//Liminality	Junichiro Tokuoka		
2002	Witch Hunter Robin	Zaizen		
2002	Mirage of Blaze	Nobutsuna Naoe		
2002	Yukikaze	Narrator, Radio Voice, Krak		
2002	Heat Guy J	Noriega		
2003	Wolf's Rain	Indian Chief		
2003	Avenger	Lord Volk, Jade, Official B		
2003	Ai Yori Aoshi	Mayu's father, Worker		
2003	Lunar Legend Tsukihime	NRVNQSR Chaos/Nero Chaos		
2003	The Twelve Kingdoms	Heki Rakujin, Jyouyuu, Koshou		
2003	Gungrave	Brad "Blood War" Wong		
2003	.hack//Liminality	Junichiro Tokuoka		
2003	Avenger	Volk		
2004	Planetes	Yuri		
2004	Gankutsuou: The Count of Monte Cristo	The Count/Edmund Dantes	Credited as Taylor Henry	
2004	Tenjou Tenge	Bob Makihara		
2004	Naruto	Hashirama Senju, various characters		
2004	Tales of Phantasia: The Animation	Morrison, Narration, Official		
2004	Viewtiful Joe	Hulk Davidson, Additional Voices		
2004	Stellvia	Carlos, Tamotsu Kazamatsuri		
2005	Karas	Otoha's Father		
2005	Battle B-Daman	Sly		
2005	Bobobo-bo Bo-bobo	Jelly Jiggler, Mean Green Soup Alien, Triple Bag (Transformed)		
2005	Eureka Seven	Brittany, Norb		
2005	Burn-Up Scramble	Additional voices		
2005	Duel Masters	Prince Irving		
2005	Fafner in the Azure	Seiichiro Kaname		
2005	Gun Sword	Narrator, Announcer, Mayor		
2005	Idaten Jump	Additional voices		
2005	Kyo Kara Maoh!	Harris		
2005	Mars Daybreak	Chrysalis Milch		
2005	Samurai Champloo	Oniwakamaru		
2006	Code Geass	Diethard Ried		
2006	Fate/stay night	Kirei Kotomine		
2006	Digimon Data Squad	Commander Sampson		
2006	Bleach	Yasutora "Chad" Sado, Muramasa		
2006	Ergo Proxy	Lieutenant Omacatl		
2007	Gurren Lagann	Lordgenome		
2007	Ghost Slayers Ayashi	Abi		
2008	Blue Dragon	Captain of the Norg		
2008	Tweeny Witches	Grande	Credited as Taylor Henry	
2008	Vampire Knight	Asato "Ichio" Ichijo		
2008	The Third: The Girl with the Blue Eye	Bogie		
2011	Fate/Zero	Rider		
2011	Marvel Anime: Blade	Sir Howard, Council Member, Collaborator, High Council Member, Old High Council Member, Young High Council Member		
2011	Marvel Anime: Wolverine	Vadhaka		
2011	Marvel Anime: Iron Man	Prime Minister, Tower Voice, Chairman		
2012	ZETMAN	EVOL leader		
2012	Nura: Rise of the Yokai Clan	Gyuki, Tanro, Tearai-Oni		
2013–22	Tiger & Bunny	Albert Maverick, Timo Massini, Bacchus		
2014	Blood Lad	Acropolis Messenger, Gatekeeper, North Territory Boss, ONIQLO Store Manager, Vampire		
2014	Coppelion	Denjiro Shiba		
2014	Sword Art Online: Extra Edition	Leviathan		
2014	Nura: Rise of the Yokai Clan: Demon Capital	Gyuki, Gashadokuro, Oni-Hitokuchi		
2015	JoJo's Bizarre Adventure	Tarkus		
2015	The Seven Deadly Sins	Dreyfus		
2016	March Comes In like a Lion	Raido Fujimoto	Credited as Taylor Henry	
2016	Bungo Stray Dogs	Fukuzawa Yukichi		
2016	Kuromukuro	Arthur Graham		
2016	Kabaneri of the Iron Fortress	Kurusu Konochi		
2016	Ajin: Demi-Human	Colonel Kouma, Kita		
2016	One-Punch Man	Dr. Bofoi, Ancient King, Zanbai		
2016	Mobile Suit Gundam: Iron-Blooded Orphans	Nadi Yukinojo Kassapa		
2016	Marvel Disk Wars: The Avengers	Mandarin, News Reporter, Professor		
2017	Naruto Shippuden	Tobirama Senju		
2017	Dragon Ball Super	Mr. Satan	Bang Zoom! Entertainment dub; Produced for Toonami Asia	
2017	Lupin the Third Part IV	Leonardo Da Vinci		
2017	Glitter Force Doki Doki	Gura		
2017	The Dragon Dentist	Yotoshio Godo		
2017	Blue Exorcist: Kyoto Saga	Tatsuma's Dad		
2018	Hunter x Hunter	Leol	Credited as Taylor Henry	
2018	Aggretsuko	CEO, Additional voices		
2018	Sword Gai: The Animation	Amon Ogata		
2018	Saint Seiya: The Lost Canvas	Taurus Aldebaran		
2018	Megalo Box	Fujimaki		
2019	Forest of Piano	Hoffman		
2019	Beyblade Burst Rise	Tango Koryu	Credited as Taylor Henry	
2019	Kengan Ashura	Aku Fujio, Bodyguard C, Erio Kure, Fighter 6, Gen Shikano (Kano), Komada Shigeru, Male Passenger D, Manager A, Man 5, Masaki's Father, Okubo, President A		
2019	Levius	Hugo Stratas		
2020	Dorohedoro	Tanba	Credited as Taylor Henry	
2020	Lupin the Third Part V	Gaston	Credited as Taylor Henry	
2020	BNA: Brand New Animal	Giuliano Flip, Additional voices	Credited as Taylor Henry	
2020	Japan Sinks: 2020	Osamu Asada, Additional voices		
2020	Great Pretender	Inspector Anderson		
2020	Dragon's Dogma	Ethan's father		
2020	The Case Files of Lord El-Melloi II	Rider/Iskandar		
2021	Cells at Work! Code Black	Killer T Cell		
2021	Bungo Stray Dogs Wan!	Yukichi Fukuzawa		
2021	Kuroko's Basketball	Kozo Shirogane		
2021–23	Vinland Saga	King Sweyn	Netflix dub	
2022	Tekken: Bloodline	Paul Phoenix, Dr. Bosconovitch		
2023	Zom 100: Bucket List of the Dead	Gonzou Kosugi		
2023	Pluto	Inspector Wallace, General Scott		
2023	Jujutsu Kaisen	Dagon		
2024	The Grimm Variations	Brown	Episode 2: "Little Red Riding Hood"	
2026	Steel Ball Run: JoJo's Bizarre Adventure	Steven Steel		

=== Animation ===
List of voice performances in animation
Year	Title	Role	Notes	Source
2006	The Little Polar Bear: Lars and the Little Tiger	Crocodile, Orca, Theo's Father		
2007	Winx Club: The Secret of the Lost Kingdom	Bartelby		
2008	Gormiti	Air Gormiti		
2013	Ever After High	Milton Grimm, Not So Little Jack Horner		
2014	Lego Friends	Mayor	As Taylor Henry	
2015	Fin Punch!	Announcer, Archer, Arnold, Fat Man McClane, Guy in Stands 1, News Anchor, Old Man, Orca Suit Archer		
2016	Zorro: The Chronicles	Monasterio		
2016	The Adventures of Panda Warrior	Crusher the Ox		
2016	Lastman	Howard MacKenzie, additional voices		
2016	The Last Prince of Atlantis	Dockworker C, Dolphin		
2019	Rainbow Butterfly Unicorn Kitty	Troll, Merlin, Demon		
2019	Power Players	Bearbarian		
2020	The Academy of Magic	Lambert		

=== Films ===
List of voice performances in film
Year	Title	Role	Notes	Source
1989	Patlabor: The Movie	Seitoru Sakaki		
1993	Patlabor 2: The Movie	Seitoru Sakaki, Commanding Officer B		
2001	Metropolis	Duke Red		
2001	Akira	Colonel Shikishima	Animaze, Geneon/Pioneer 2001 dub	
2003	Sakura Wars: The Movie	Yokihiko Ota		
2005	Appleseed	Briareos Hecatonchires	Geneon Entertainment dub	
2006	Final Fantasy VII: Advent Children	Reeve Tuesti		
2008	Kite Liberator	Orudo Noguichi, Sugai		
2008	Strait Jacket	Reegs		
2008	Bleach: Memories of Nobody	Yasutora Sado		
2009	Bleach: The DiamondDust Rebellion	Yasutora Sado		
2011	Naruto Shippuden the Movie: Bonds	Shinno		
2011	Tekken: Blood Vengeance	Heihachi Mishima	Credited as Taylor Henry	
2012	Redline	Colonel Volton		
2012	Fate/Stay Night: Unlimited Blade Works	Kirei Kotomine		
2012	Bleach: Hell Verse	Yasutora Sado, Gunjō		
2013	Berserk: Golden Age Arc III: The Descent	Skull Knight		
2015	Lupin III: Jigen's Gravestone	Yael Okuzaki		
2017	Digimon Adventure tri.	Angemon, MagnaAngemon, Seraphimon, Additional voices		
2017	Blame!	Pops		
2018	Godzilla: Planet of the Monsters	Mulu Elu Galu Gu	Netflix	
2018	Godzilla: City on the Edge of Battle	Mulu Elu Galu Gu	Netflix	
2020	Tokyo Godfathers	Ōta, Drag Queen #4, Doctor		
2020	Altered Carbon: Reenfundados	Genzo		
2020	Digimon Adventure: Last Evolution Kizuna	Angemon		
2021	Lupin the 3rd vs. Detective Conan: The Movie	James Black		
2022	Lupin the 3rd Episode 0: The First Contact	Galvez	Television film	
2023	Case Closed: The Scarlet Bullet	James Black		
2026	‘’The Castle of Cagliostro’’	Count Cagliostro	Epcar Entertainment/Discotek Media dub	

=== Video games ===
List of voice performances in video games
Year	Title	Role	Notes	Source
2003	The Lord of the Rings: War of the Ring	Aragorn, Orc Master Tutorial, Wraith		
2004	Seven Samurai 20XX	W		
2004	World of Warcraft	Ga'Nar, Baine Bloodhoof, Lord Jaraxxus, Admiral Taylor, Niuzao, Sartharion, Yogg-Saron, Thorim		
2004	Shadow Hearts: Covenant	Masaji Kato		
2005	Tom Clancy's Rainbow Six: Lockdown	John Clark		
2005	Dungeons & Dragons: Dragonshard	Turtle Soldier, Dwarf Barbarian		
2005	Call of Duty 2	A Flight 2, Tanker 1		
2006	Dirge of Cerberus: Final Fantasy VII	Reeve Tuesti		
2006	God Hand	Elvis, Angra, Villains		
2006	.hack//G.U. series	Ovan, Announcer, Gao Grunty	Reprises Ovan in .hack//G.U. Last Recode	
2007	Rogue Galaxy	Narrator, Ertessa, Bolgo		
2007	Supreme Commander	Dr. Brackman, Maj. Godwyn, Col Alex Rodgers		
2007	Digimon World Data Squad	Commander Richard Sampson		
2007	Clive Barker's Jericho	Xavier Jones, Antadurunnu	Grouped under Cast	
2008	Space Siege	Pilot, Vargas, Osborne Cyborg		
2008	Tales of Vesperia	Duke Pantarei		
2009	Naruto series	Tobirama Senju, Hashirama Senju, Enzo Tenro		
2009	BlazBlue series	Iron Tager		
2010	Darksiders	Narrator, Angel Soldier, Council 3		
2010	Super Street Fighter IV	Announcer	Credited as Taylor Henry	
2010	Nier	Protagonist		
2010	Transformers: War for Cybertron	Warpath		
2010	StarCraft II: Wings of Liberty	Firebat, Protoss Zealot, Preserver, Protoss Expedition Leader		
2010	Cabela's Dangerous Hunts 2011	Samson Rainsford		
2011	Mortal Kombat 9	Noob Saibot, Announcer		
2011	Red Faction: Armageddon	Adam Hale	Facial capture	
2011	Catherine	Nergal, The Narrator		
2011	MagnaCarta 2	Argo		
2012	Street Fighter X Tekken	Heihachi Mishima	Credited as Taylor Henry	
2012	Prototype 2	Pilot, Soldier, Super Soldier		
2012	Diablo III	Male Monk		
2012	The Amazing Spider-Man	Oscorp Colonels		
2012	Darksiders II	Nathaniel		
2012	Transformers: Fall of Cybertron	Warpath, Autobot Shotgunner		
2012	Guild Wars 2	Gaheron Baelfire		
2012	Call of Duty: Black Ops II	Commander, Vehicle Op, Soldier		
2013	Metro: Last Light	Miller		
2013	Power Rangers Megaforce	Gosei, Bluefur		
2013	B-Daman Crossfire	Twin / Double Drazeros		
2014	Broken Age	Brommel		
2014	Earth Defense Force 2025	Various EDF Soldiers		
2014	Hearthstone	Lord Jaraxxus		
2014	SMITE	Sacred Grounds Geb, Bone Wraith Kukulkan, Crime Boss Kuzenbo		
2015	Mortal Kombat X	Ermac, Announcer		
2015	Heroes of the Storm	Kharazim		
2015	Transformers: Devastation	Mixmaster, Hook, Superion		
2016	Bravely Second: End Layer	Nikolai Nikolanikov		
2016	World of Warcraft: Legion	Navarrogg, Vethir, Varimathras		
2017	Persona 5	Sojiro Sakura	Reprises role in Royal	
2017	Fire Emblem Heroes	Virion, Hawkeye, Zephiel	Credited as Taylor Henry	
2017	Fire Emblem Echoes: Shadows of Valentia	Rudolf		
2018	Monster Hunter: World	Commander		
2018	Detective Pikachu	Frank Holiday	Credited as Taylor Henry	
2018	World of Warcraft: Battle for Azeroth	Baine Bloodhoof, Kthir, Lord Stormsong		
2019	Metro Exodus	Miller		
2019	Mortal Kombat 11	Klassic Announcer		
2019	Judgment	Kunihiko Morita		
2019	Fire Emblem: Three Houses	Nemesis	Credited as Taylor Henry	Resume
2019	Marvel Ultimate Alliance 3: The Black Order	Surtur		
2019	Catherine: Full Body	Nergal, The Narrator		
2019	Daemon X Machina	Falcon	Credited as Taylor Henry	
2019	Paladins: Champions of the Realm	Raum		
2020	One-Punch Man: A Hero Nobody Knows	Metal Knight		
2020	Guardian Tales	Marvin, Girgas		
2020	Marvel's Avengers	Abomination		
2020	The Legend of Heroes: Trails of Cold Steel IV	Viscount Victor S. Arseid, General Vandyck	Credited as Taylor Henry	
2020	Yakuza: Like a Dragon	Juro Horinouchi		
2020	World of Warcraft: Shadowlands	Baine Bloodhoof		
2021	Persona 5 Strikers	Sojiro Sakura		
2021	Granblue Fantasy Versus	Soriz		
2021	Nier Replicant ver.1.22474487139...	Player: World of the Recycled Vessel		
2021	Shin Megami Tensei III: Nocturne HD Remaster	Kagutsuchi		
2021	Guilty Gear -STRIVE-	Leo Whitefang		
2021	Dungeons & Dragons: Dark Alliance	Wulfgar		
2021	Akiba's Trip	Ryuji Sejima		
2021	Lost Judgment	Jo Masuda, Yuzo Okuda		
2022	Rune Factory 5	Darroch		
2022	Star Ocean: The Divine Force	JJ		
2023	Octopath Traveler II	Juvah		
2023	The Legend of Heroes: Trails into Reverie	Victor S. Arseid, Soldiers & Citizens of Zemuria		
2023	Mortal Kombat 1	Ermac, Jerrod, Announcer, Khaos Preacher		
2023	Like a Dragon Gaiden: The Man Who Erased His Name	Additional voices		
2023	Granblue Fantasy Versus: Rising	Soriz		
2024	Like a Dragon: Infinite Wealth	Additional voices		
2024	Tekken 8	Paul Phoenix	Credited as Jamieson K. Price	
2024	Final Fantasy VII Rebirth	Zangan		
2024	Unicorn Overlord	Colm		
2024	Farmagia	Dentro	Credited as Taylor Henry	
2025	Yakuza 0 Director's Cut	Additional voices	Credited as Jamieson K Price	
2025	Date Everything!	David Most		
2026	Yakuza Kiwami 3 & Dark Ties	Yoshinobu Suzuki, Junichi Sudo, additional voices		
2026	Shinobi: Art of Vengeance	Death Adder	"Sega Villains Stage" DLC	
2026	Order of the Sinking Star	Borraidus		

=== Live action ===
List of live-action performances
Year	Title	Role	Notes	Source
1998	The Secret Kingdom	The Regent		
2000	The Patriot	Captain Bordon		
2001	Unsolved Mysteries	Leonard		
2002	Bounty	Joe	Short film	
2002	In-Laws	Photographer		
2002	Frasier	Barfly number 3		
2004	Seeing Iris	Father	Short film	
2005	According to Jim	Speaker		
2008	Without a Trace	Union Soldier		
2008	Days of Our Lives	Professor DiCarlo		
2008	God Bless America	Additional voices		
2013	The Thundermans	Dark Mayhem		
2014	Straight	Protester	Short film	
2016	Marseille	Robert Taro, Edmond D'Abrantes (American version)		
2016	The Bell	Father	Short film	
2016	Westworld	Confederado Sergeant		
2017	Money Heist	Helsinki/Yashin Dasáyev (American version)		
2018	Wild District	Santiago (American version)		
2019	Shazam!	Additional voices		
2020	The Valhalla Murders	Steinthor (American version)		
2024	The Thundermans Return	Dark Mayhem		
