= Metal Skin Panic MADOX-01 =

1987 original video animation directed by Shinji Aramaki

- Cover of AnimEigo 15th Anniversary DVD

メタルスキンパニック MADOX-01 (Metaru Sukin Panikku Madokkusu Zero Wan)
- Genre: Science fiction Mecha; Comedy
- Created by: Shinji Aramaki
- Original video animation
- Directed by: Shinji Aramaki
- Produced by: Ayumi Enomoto; Shigeo Yagita; Shūji Uchiyama
- Music by: Ken Yajima
- Studio: AIC; Artmic
- Licensed by: NA: AnimEigo; UK: Manga Entertainment
- Released: December 16, 1987
- Runtime: 41 minutes

Metal Skin Panic MADOX-01 (メタルスキンパニック MADOX-01(マドックスゼロワン), Metaru Sukin Panikku Madokkusu Zero Wan) is a 1987 original video animation produced by AIC, Soeishinsha and Pony Canyon and directed and conceptualized by Shinji Aramaki. It has been licensed in the United States by AnimEigo. The plot centers on a mechanic who comes across the MADOX-01, a heavy powered armor suit designed to fight enemy tanks. After getting trapped in the suit before reading the user's manual, the military attempts to reclaim it, leaving him with no choice but to defend himself.

Aramaki, who was in charge of the original idea, directing, and mechanical design, later recalled that he was still in his 20s and didn't know what to be afraid of when he made the OVA, which was also his directorial debut.

== Plot ==
One day, Kōji Sugimoto, a young man who works as a mechanic at a car maintenance shop, inadvertently gets into the "Slave Trooper MADOX-01," a new anti-tank land weapon that was being transported in secret. He is unable to get out of the MADOX-01 due to a software bug. He can't figure out how to use the suit, and is subsequently chased by the military. Kōji, still stuck in the suit, heads for the building where he is to meet his girlfriend Shiori Nagura, but Lieutenant Kilgore, an American soldier with a personal grudge against MADOX-01, is waiting for him in a tank. With the advice of Eriko Kusumoto, the developer of MADOX-01, Kōji is able to battle Kilgore.

== Characters ==
Kouji Sugimoto (杉本 紘二, Sugimoto Kouji)
The main protagonist, a poor mechanic who works part-time majoring in engineering. His friend Haruo finds a top secret cargo in his truck and alerts his friend Kouji to check it out due to his engineering background. After wondering what to do Kouji takes the initiative to bring back the unknown cargo back to his apartment. Once they've dropped the cargo to his apartment, before leaving, Haruo passes down a message from his girlfriend Shiori that she'll be waiting at the NSR building tonight. Kouji begins to inspect the cargo while reading the manual that came along with it. While doing so he manages to open up the cargo revealing the MADOX-01. He successfully gets inside it but suddenly the MADOX-01 shuts Koji inside causing it to alert the military of its whereabouts. Kouji now needs to figure out how to get out of the suit while being hunted by the military.
Eriko "Ellie" Kusumoto (楠本 枝里子, Kusumoto Eriko)
A female test ace pilot and lead software developer for the MADOX project. When the military is notified of the missing MADOX, they manage to pick up the signal of its whereabouts and begin a recovery operation to retrieve the MADOX. However, when Eriko finds out about Lt. Kilgore's evil intentions when independently joining the recovery operation, she proceeds to participate as well. She pilots the MADOX-0 in order to intercept the missing MADOX-01 and trying to prevent 1st Lt. Kilgore from wreaking havoc from his vengeful obsession with the MADOX-01. She later becomes a supporting character.
First Lt. Kilgore (キルゴア中尉, Kirugoa-chūi)
An elite tank driver who was involved in a VR (Virtual Reality) Simulation battle with the MADOX-01. Within 3 minutes the MADOX-01 decimated Kilgore and the other simulation drivers. While fueled by revenge, hate and his obsession towards the MADOX, the MADOX-01 sends out a signal that the military suddenly picked up. Hearing about this, Lt Kilgore independently participates the recovery operation sending himself off with his tank to hunt down the MADOX.
Haruo Onose (小野瀬 春男, Onose Haruo)
Delivery truck driver and friend of the main protagonist Kouji Sugimoto. Onose happens to find an unknown cargo inside the back of his truck. Realizing that his friend who is a mechanic, he brings Koji to come and check out what was inside his truck. He and Kouji then begins to bring the unknown cargo back to Koji's apartment. Onose also passes a message to Kouji that was from Nagura Shiori to meet her at a building in Nishi-Shinjuku, before bowing out of the special.
Shiori Nagura (名倉しおり, Nagura Shiori)
Kouji's girlfriend. Shown usually in flash backs of her, she tells him that she is being sent to study abroad by her father in England for 3 years in about 4 days.

== Credits ==
=== Cast ===
Metal Skin Panic MADOX-01 cast
Role	Japanese	English	
Role	Japanese	Swirl Films (1995)	World Wide Group (1996)
Kouji Sugimoto	Yasunori Matsumoto	Scott Simpson	Michael Magee
Eriko "Ellie" Kusumoto	Youko Asagami	Ellen Lee	Nadia de Lemeny
Lieutenant Kilgore	Kazuyuki Sogabe	Zach Hanner	Peter Woodward
Shiori Nagura	Yuriko Ishida	Connie Nelson	
Haruo Onose	Arihiro Hase	Shaun O'Rourke	John Stefaniuk
Ellie's Superior	Michihiro Ikemizu	Bill Sellers	Marc Smith
US Army General	Masashi Hirose	Rick Forrester	Allan Wenger
Mr. Okawasaki	Kouzou Shioya	Steve Vernon	
High Official	Kazuo Oka	Gray Sibley	
SDF Officer	Masayuki Katou	Pierre Brulatour	
Technician	Satoru Inagaki	Robert Wailes	
Store Clerk	Hiroko Yamaguchi	Melissa Stanley	
Chopper Pilot		Bobby Wilde	
Ellie's Helicopter Pilot		Chris Jarman	
Obnoxious Driver (1)	Hirohiko Kakegawa	Steve Rassin	
Obnoxious Driver (2)	Yuuki Sato	Mac Ingraham	
Soldier		Nathan Gray	
Overstressed Elevator		Jane Sampson	

=== Staff ===
Metal Skin Panic MADOX-01 staff
Job	Staff
Director	Shinji Aramaki
Art Director	Youichi Nango
Character Design	Hideki Tamura
Director of Photography	Masahide Okino
Mechanical Design	Kimitoshi Yamane Shinji Aramaki
Music composer	Ken Yajima
Storyboarding	Shinji Aramaki
Sound Director	Yasunori Honda

== Release ==
The anime was licensed by AnimEigo and its first release for Western audiences in 1989 and was distributed by Manga Entertainment (UK) along with different English dub versions from the UK version and the AnimEigo version. On April 30, 2021, a Kickstarter was launched for a Blu-ray release of the OVA. It reached its goal within 42 minutes of its launch.

== Featurette ==
A VHS featurette was released showcasing a live action documentary demo of weapons and vehicles being demonstrated that was used in the anime film. The title of the featurette was called The World of the Weapons of Metal Skin Panic MADOX-01. It showcased various military vehicles from the Japan Self-Defense Forces such as helicopters and tanks.
