= USS Prometheus =

USS Prometheus may refer to the follow ships of the United States Navy:

- USS Prometheus (1814), a brig in the United States Navy from 1814 to 1818
- USS Prometheus (AR-3), a repair ship that served during World War I and World War II

USS Prometheus may refer to the follow ships of the Startrek franchise:

- USS Prometheus, a fictional spacecraft in the episode "Message in a Bottle" of Star Trek: Voyager
- USS Prometheus, a fictional starship in the episode "Second Sight" of Star Trek: Deep Space Nine
