= Promethium (disambiguation) =

Promethium is a chemical element with symbol Pm and atomic number 61.

Promethium may also refer to:

== Fictional entities ==
- Promethium, a fictional petroleum-based fossil fuel as well as a refined napalm-like substance in Warhammer 40,000
- Promethium, the name of the Mechanic Empire's queen in the fictional universe of Leiji Matsumoto
- Promethium (Marvel Comics), a fictional, magical metal in the stories published by Marvel Comics
- Promethium (DC Comics), a fictional metal from DC Comics

== See also ==
- Prometheum, a genus of plants in the family Crassulaceae
- Pm (disambiguation)
- Proscenium, the concept of space in live theater
- Prometrium, a brand name of the drug progesterone
