= Promethean =

Promethean may refer to:

- Promethean: The Created, a role-playing game
- Prometheans, a character type in the video game Age of Mythology: The Titans
- Prometheans, an American Theosophist group co-founded by Thomas Wilfred

== See also ==
- Promethean Theatre, Adelaide, a former theatre in Adelaide, South Australia
- Promethean World, a global education company
- Prometheanism, a philosophy advocating human progress through technology and mastery over nature
- Prometheism, a political project initiated by Poland's Józef Piłsudski
- Prometheus (disambiguation)
