= Kazuyoshi Katayama =

Japanese animator and director

Kazuyoshi Katayama (片山 一良, Katayama Kazuyoshi) is a Japanese animator and director who directed The Big O and the King of Thorn film.

== Filmography ==
- Space Adventure Cobra: The Movie (1982) (animation)
- Nausicaä of the Valley of the Wind (1984) (assistant director and production assistant to Hayao Miyazaki)
- Persia, the Magic Fairy (1984) (director)
- Maris the Chojo (1986) (director)
- Magical Idol Pastel Yumi (1986) (episode director)
- Appleseed (1988) (director)
- Doomed Megalopolis (1991) (director)
- Giant Robo (1992) (animation director)
- Those Who Hunt Elves (1996) (director of series 1)
- Sentimental Journey (1998) (director)
- The Big O (1999) (series director)
- Brave King GaoGaiGar Final (2000) (storyboard)
- Argento Soma (2000) (director)
- Samurai Champloo (2004) (storyboard)
- Karas (2005) (storyboard)
- Keroro Gunsō the Super Movie (2006) (key animation)
- Freedom (2006) (storyboard and episode director on episode 1)
- Appleseed: Ex Machina (2007) (storyboard)
- King of Thorn (2009) (director)
- Tiger & Bunny (2011) (storyboard)
- Tekken: Blood Vengeance (2011) (storyboard)
- Hello from the Countries of the World (2015) (director)
