= PM =

PM or pm (also written P.M. or p.m.) is an abbreviation for Latin post meridiem, meaning "after midday" in the 12-hour clock.

PM or Pm or pm may also refer to:

== Arts, entertainment, and media ==
- Palm mute, a guitar playing technique
- PM (radio program), Australia
- PM (BBC Radio 4), UK
- PM Magazine, an American TV news program (1976–1991)
- PM (newspaper), US (1940–1948)
- PM Press, an American publishing company
- Pocket Mortys, a role-playing video game
- Popular Mechanics, a magazine (1902-present)
- Project Mayhem, a fictional conspiracy in the book and film Fight Club
- PM, a band with drummer Carl Palmer
- Private message

== Business and economics ==
=== Businesses ===
- P.M. Place Stores, a former US chain of discount stores
- Pere Marquette Railway, North America 1900–1947, reporting mark
- Philip Morris International, a tobacco company
- Proton Mail, a Swiss end-to-end encrypted email service launched in 2014

=== Terminology ===
- Performance management of an organisation
- Portfolio manager
- Preventive maintenance
- Project manager
- Product manager
- Program manager
- Product marketer

== Government ==
- Prime minister
- Polícia Militar, Brazilian military police
- U.S. Department of State Bureau of Political-Military Affairs

== People ==
- P.M. (author) or p.m., pseudonym of Hans Widmer (born 1947), Swiss author
- Pat Maloney Sr. (1924–2005), American trial lawyer

== Science, technology, and mathematics ==
=== Biology and medicine ===
- Plasma membrane, also known as cell membrane
- Polymyositis, a disease
- Poor metabolizer, a term used in pharmacogenomics to refer to individuals with little to no functional metabolic activity
- Post-mortem
- Precision medicine
- Pyridoxamine, the amine form of vitamin B_{6}

=== Chemistry and materials science ===
- Parametric Method 3 (PM3 (chemistry)), in computational chemistry
- Particulate matter, microscopic particles suspended in the air
  - PM10, particulates smaller than 10 μm
- Powder metallurgy, a method of fabricating metals
- Promethium, symbol Pm, a chemical element
- Pm (space group), three-dimensional space group number 6

=== Computing ===
- Particle mesh, an algorithm for determining forces
- Perl module, file extension .pm

=== Units of measurement ===
- Petametre (Pm), a length unit (10^{15} m)
- Picometre (pm), a length unit (10^{−12} m)
- Picomolar (pM), a unit of molar concentration

=== Vehicles ===
- Martin PM, a version of the Naval Aircraft Factory PN flying boat
- Toyota PM, a concept car
- Pm36, a Polish steam locomotive

=== Weapons ===
==== Guns and mortars ====
- Makarov PM (Pistolet Makarova), a Soviet and Russian pistol
- Minebea PM-9, a Japanese submachine gun
- PM-38, a Soviet light mortar
- PM-63 RAK, Polish submachine gun
- PM-84 Glauberyt, Polish submachine gun
- PM md 96, a Romanian submachine gun
- Precision Marksman (PM), a sniper rifle and precursor to the accuracy international arctic warfare rifle

==== Mines ====
- PM-43 and PM-68 mine, Finland
- PM-60 mine, East Germany
- PM-79 mine, Bulgaria

=== Other uses in science, technology, and mathematics ===
- PM-1, PM-2A, PM-3A, US Army portable nuclear reactors
- Phase modulation, in signal processing
- Polarization-maintaining optical fiber or PM fiber
- Principia Mathematica, by Whitehead and Russell
- The plus or minus sign, a symbol used in mathematics

== Other uses ==
- Passage Meditation, a form of meditation developed by Eknath Easwaran
- Pickleball Manitoba, Canadian provincial pickleball association
- Saint Pierre and Miquelon (ISO 3166-1 alpha-2 country code)
  - .pm, top-level domain (ccTLD) for Saint Pierre and Miquelon
- Primitive Methodist, a Christian denomination
