= Yoshisada Sakaguchi =

Japanese actor and voice actor (1939–2020)

- 坂口 芳貞
- Born: 2 October 1939; Tokyo Prefecture, Japan
- Died: 13 February 2020 (aged 80); Tokyo, Japan
- Occupations: Actor; voice actor
- Years active: 1960–2020
- Agent: Bungakuza
- Height: 175 cm (5 ft 9 in)

Yoshisada Sakaguchi (坂口 芳貞, Sakaguchi Yoshisada; 2 October 1939 – 13 February 2020) was a Japanese actor and voice actor from Tokyo. He was a professor at J. F. Oberlin University, and was affiliated with Bungakuza. He was best known for dubbing over Morgan Freeman and Chief Inspector Japp (in the television series Agatha Christie's Poirot).

== Filmography ==
=== Television drama ===
- Katsu Kaishū (????) (Emon Sensa Gunji)
- Kōmyō ga tsuji (????) (Village headman)
- Tobu ga Gotoku (????) (Yūtoku Seki)
- Aoi (2000) (Kazu'uji Nakamura)

=== Film ===
- Portrait of Brothers (2019)

=== Stage ===
- Tōkyō Genshikaku Club (????) (Hikojirō Ōkubo)

=== Television animation ===
- Alexander Senki (1999) (Philip II of Macedon)
- Mushishi (2005) (Mujika)

=== Original video animation (OVA) ===
- Appleseed (1988) (Briareos Hecatonchires)
- Record of Lodoss War (1990) (Ghim)

=== Animated film ===
- Jin-Roh: The Wolf Brigade (1999) (Hachiroh Tohbe)
- JoJo's Bizarre Adventure: Phantom Blood (2007) (Tonpetty)
- The Tibetan Dog (2011)

=== Video games ===
- Sakura Wars 3 ~Pari ha Mo Eteiroku~ (2001) (Leon)

=== Dubbing roles ===
==== Live-action ====
- Morgan Freeman
  - Robin Hood: Prince of Thieves (2004 TV Tokyo edition) (Azeem)
  - Unforgiven (Ned Logan)
  - The Shawshank Redemption (1997 TBS edition) (Red)
  - Outbreak (General Billy Ford)
  - Seven (Detective Lt. William Somerset)
  - Kiss the Girls (Alex Cross)
  - Under Suspicion (Captain Victor Benezet)
  - Along Came a Spider (Alex Cross)
  - High Crimes (Charlie Grimes)
  - The Sum of All Fears (William Cabot)
  - Million Dollar Baby (Eddie "Scrap-Iron" Dupris)
  - Unleashed (Sam)
  - Batman Begins (2007 Nippon TV edition) (Lucius Fox)
  - Edison (Moses Ashford)
  - The Bucket List (Carter Chambers)
  - Gone Baby Gone (Captain Jack Doyle)
  - The Dark Knight (2012 TV Asashi edition) (Lucius Fox)
  - Wanted (Sloan)
  - Invictus (Nelson Mandela)
  - Thick as Thieves (Keith Ripley)
  - Red (Joe Matheson)
  - Last Vegas (Archibald "Archie" Clayton)
  - Now You See Me (Thaddeus Bradley)
  - Oblivion (Malcolm Beech)
  - Olympus Has Fallen (Allan Trumbull)
  - Lucy (Professor Samuel Norman)
  - Transcendence (Joseph Tagger)
  - Last Knights (Bartok)
  - Ted 2 (Patrick Meighan)
  - London Has Fallen (Allan Trumbull)
  - Now You See Me 2 (Thaddeus Bradley)
  - Going in Style (Willie Davis)
  - The Nutcracker and the Four Realms (Drosselmeyer)
- 12 Angry Men (2003 NHK edition) (Juror #2 (Ossie Davis))
- 25th Hour (James Brogan (Brian Cox))
- Agatha Christie's Poirot (Chief Inspector Japp (Philip Jackson))
- Airport '77 (1987 TV Asahi edition) (Martin Wallace (Christopher Lee))
- Armageddon (2002 Fuji TV edition) (Narrator (Charlton Heston))
- Battlestar Galactica (1978) (Commander Adama (Lorne Greene))
- Battlestar Galactica (2004) (William Adama (Edward James Olmos))
- Bram Stoker's Dracula (Professor Abraham Van Helsing (Anthony Hopkins))
- Christine (1990 TV Asahi edition) (Will Darnell (Robert Prosky))
- The Chronicles of Narnia: The Voyage of the Dawn Treader (Lord Bern (Terry Norris))
- A Civil Action (Jerome Facher (Robert Duvall))
- Commando (1989 TV Asahi edition) (Cooke (Bill Duke))
- Conan the Barbarian (1989 TV Asahi edition) (Thulsa Doom (James Earl Jones))
- The Da Vinci Code (Sir Leigh Teabing (Ian McKellen))
- Deep Impact (Captain Spurgeon "Fish" Tanner (Robert Duvall))
- Die Hard (1990 TV Asahi edition) (Sergeant Al Powell (Reginald VelJohnson))
- Die Hard with a Vengeance (Inspector Walter Cobb (Larry Bryggman))
- Doogie Howser, M.D. (Doctor David Howser (James B. Sikking))
- ER (Herb Spivak (Dan Hedaya))
- Falling Down (1997 TV Asahi edition) (Sergeant Martin Prendergast (Robert Duvall))
- Get Shorty (Harry Zimm (Gene Hackman))
- The Getaway (Jack Beynon (Ben Johnson))
- Gladiator (2003 TV Asahi edition) (Antonius Proximo (Oliver Reed))
- Goosebumps (Opening Narrator (R. L. Stine))
  - Goosebumps (Mr. Black (R. L. Stine))
- The Great Escape (2000 TV Tokyo edition) (Flight Lieutenant Colin Blythe (Donald Pleasence))
- The Great Escape II: The Untold Story (Captain David Matthews (Judd Hirsch))
- Grudge Match (Louis "Lightning" Conlon (Alan Arkin))
- Hard Target (Emil Fouchon (Lance Henriksen))
- Hugo (Georges Méliès / Papa Georges (Ben Kingsley))
- The Fifth Element (Video/DVD edition) (General Munro (Brion James))
- Focus (Bucky Spurgeon/Owens (Gerald McRaney))
- Indiana Jones and the Last Crusade (1998 TV Asahi edition) (Professor Henry Jones (Sean Connery))
- Indiana Jones and the Temple of Doom (Mola Ram (Amrish Puri))
- Indiana Jones and the Kingdom of the Crystal Skull (Dean Charles Stanforth (Jim Broadbent))
- Jack and Jill (Al Pacino)
- The Last Boy Scout (1995 Fuji TV edition) (Sheldon "Shelly" Marcone (Noble Willingham))
- Lawrence of Arabia (2000 TV Tokyo edition) (Auda Abu Tayi (Anthony Quinn))
- Léon: The Professional (Tony (Danny Aiello))
- Letters to Juliet (Lorenzo Bartolini (Franco Nero))
- Mad Max (1982 NTV edition) (Toecutter (Hugh Keays-Byrne))
- Man from Atlantis (C.W. Crawford (Alan Fudge))
- Men in Black II (Agent K (Tommy Lee Jones))
- Munich (Hans (Hanns Zischler))
- Night at the Museum (Reginald (Bill Cobbs))
- Night at the Museum: Secret of the Tomb (Reginald (Bill Cobbs))
- The Nightmare Room (Narrator (R. L. Stine))
- The Passage (Alain Renoudot (Michael Lonsdale))
- The Physician (Ibn Sina (Ben Kingsley))
- The Poseidon Adventure (1991 TV Asahi edition) (Detective Lieutenant Mike Rogo (Ernest Borgnine))
- Road to Avonlea (Clive Pettibone (David Fox))
- The Rock (2000 TV Asahi edition) (Special Air Service Captain John Patrick Mason (Sean Connery))
- Romeo + Juliet (Father Laurence (Pete Postlethwaite))
- Shaft (John Shaft (Richard Roundtree))
- Shutter Island (Dr. Jeremiah Naehring (Max von Sydow))
- Space Cowboys (Colonel William "Hawk" Hawkins (Tommy Lee Jones))
- Star Wars: Episode I – The Phantom Menace (Darth Sidious (Ian McDiarmid))
- Star Wars Episode IV: A New Hope (1985 Nippon TV edition) (Darth Vader)
- The Untouchables (Jimmy Malone (Sean Connery))

==== Animation ====
- Despicable Me 3 (Silas Ramsbottom)
- Fly Me to the Moon (Amos McFly)
- The Little Prince (The King)
