= Appleseed (manga) =

Japanese manga series

- Cover of Appleseed Volume 1

アップルシード (Appurushīdo)
- Genre: Cyberpunk
- Manga
- Written by: Masamune Shirow
- Published by: Seishinsha (tankōbon); Media Factory (bunkoban); Kodansha (B5)
- English publisher: NA: Eclipse Comics (former) Dark Horse (current)
- Magazine: Comic Gaia
- English magazine: NA: Super Manga Blast!
- Original run: February 15, 1985 – April 15, 1989
- Volumes: 4
- icon

Appleseed (Japanese: アップルシード, Hepburn: Appurushīdo) is a Japanese manga series written and illustrated by Masamune Shirow. The series follows the adventures of ESWAT members Deunan Knute and Briareos Hecatonchires in Olympus. Like much of Shirow's work, Appleseed merges elements of the cyberpunk and mecha genres with politics, philosophy, and sociology. The series spans four volumes, released between 1985 and 1989. It has been adapted into an original video animation, three feature films, a 13-episode TV series, and two video games.

In 1986, Appleseed received the 17th Seiun Award for Best Manga.

== Plot ==
Appleseed takes place in the 22nd century, after the non-nuclear Third World War has led to the destruction of a majority of the Earth's people. Although countries such as the United Kingdom, the United States, and China have difficulty maintaining order and power, international organizations such as the "Sacred Republic of Munma" and "Poseidon" have been established in the aftermath.

The main characters are Deunan Knute and Briareos Hecatonchires, former SWAT members of the LAPD. They are found in the desolated city and invited to join the prestigious ESWAT (Extra Special Weapons And Tactics) organization in the utopian city of Olympus, the new world's most powerful state. Roughly one half of Olympus's population are bionically augmented.

The series follows Deunan and Briareos as they protect their new home from both foreign and domestic threats to its security.

== Manga ==
Originally published in Japan in 1985, Book One Appleseed: The Promethean Challenge was published directly to paperback instead of being serialized, a rarity in the Japanese manga market. This was soon followed by the publication of Book Two, Appleseed: Prometheus Unbound, Book Three Appleseed: The Scales of Prometheus in 1987, and Book Four Appleseed: The Promethean Balance in 1989. The fifth volume was serialized in Seishinsha's Comic Gaia in 1991, but was suspended because, in Masamune Shirow's words, "this form of serialization still did not suit Appleseed". Rumors of a possible Book Five still persist today, though Shirow had mentioned that he has no plans of pursuing it for the meantime. From 1988 to 1992, Appleseed was published in English by Eclipse Comics in comic book and volume format, packaged by Studio Proteus. The manga is currently published by Dark Horse Comics. In 2004, a special edition compiling the first two volumes was released, under the title Appleseed 01&02.

No.	Title	Original release date	English release date
1	The Promethean Challenge; Purometeusu no chōsen (プロメテウスの挑戦)	February 15, 1985; 978-4-915333-19-4	April 1990 (Eclipse Books); March 1995 (Dark Horse 2nd ed.); 978-1-56060-004-6; 978-1-56971-070-8
01. "Triple Hound Hunting"; 02. "Civvy Street"; 03. "Even Bets"; 04. "Hospitality"; 05. "Hot Potato"; 06. "The Battle Of Titan"; 07. "Rest"
2	Prometheus Unbound; Purometeusu no kaihō (プロメテウスの解放)	November 10, 1985; 978-4-915333-23-1	May 1991 (Eclipse Books); March 1995 (Dark Horse 2nd ed.); 978-1-56060-082-4; 978-1-56971-071-5
08. "Alien"; 09. "Dominate The Mind"; 10. "Hide And Seek"; 11. "Zero Hour"; 12. "The Battle of Typhon"; 13. "Appleseed"; 14. "Cybernetics"
3	The Scales Of Prometheus; Purometeusu no ko tenbin (プロメテウスの小天秤)	July 31, 1987; 978-4-915333-33-0	December 1991 (Eclipse Books); March 1995 (Dark Horse 2nd ed.); 978-1-56060-114-2; 978-1-56971-072-2
15. "Point Man"; 16. "Life Point"; 17. "Life Drive"; 18. "Dead Or Alive"; 19. "Dead Point"
4	The Promethean Balance; Purometeusu no dai tenbin (プロメテウスの大天秤)	April 15, 1989; 978-4-915333-57-6	April 1993 (Dark Horse 1st ed.); March 1995 (Dark Horse 2nd ed.); 978-1-878574-52-7; 978-1-56971-074-6
20. "Dry Run"; 21. "Decoy"; 22. "Outlet Store"; 23. "Outlook Envelope"; 24. "Stealth"; 25. "Shalom"

== Adaptations ==
- Appleseed (1988), animated film directed by Kazuyoshi Katayama
- Appleseed (2004), animated film directed by Shinji Aramaki
- Appleseed Ex Machina (2007), animated film directed by Shinji Aramaki
- Appleseed XIII (2011), animated series directed by Takayuki Hamana and Katsutaka Nanba
- Appleseed Alpha (2014), animated film directed by Shinji Aramaki

=== Tie-in books ===
In November 1988, Bandai published Appleseed Reader: Shiro Masamune's Vsual World containing live-action depictions of Deunan and Briareos and various background information about world of Appleseed.

Shirow produced the Appleseed Databook, a detailed look into the history, the people, and the technology found in the world of Appleseed, published by Seishinsha in May 1990. The book includes the short story titled "Called Game". It was released in English by Dark Horse Comics in September 1995. Seishinsha re-released Appleseed Databook with additional art as Appleseed ID ("Illustration & Data") in July 2001 and Dark Horse published it in English in December 2007.

Appleseed Hypernotes was serialized in Comic Gaia, followed by a collected volume in 1996. The Hypernotes consist of a four chapter story followed by technical information about the world, mechs, and equipment much like Appleseed Databook. An English language version of Appleseed Hypernotes was serialized in Dark Horse Comics' Super Manga Blast!. One of the terms for Hypernotes publication stated that Appleseed Hypernotes could not be released in English in collected format. The reason for this is because Shirow was unsatisfied with the work and wanted to fix it before releasing it as a complete book for English readers. Dark Horse eventually released an English trade paperback of Hypernotes in October 2007.

Pandora in the Crimson Shell: Ghost Urn, based on a concept by Masamune Shirow, with editorial contributions by Shirow in every tankobon volume, and written and illustrated by Kōshi Rikudō, was published from 2012 to 2024. The series was conceived as an effort to officially merge the already connected universes of Appleseed and Ghost in the Shell, with the long-stalled Glitch Witch envisioned as the second half of that story.

=== Anime ===
In 1988, the manga was adapted into an original animated video of the same name by Kazuyoshi Katayama. It was produced by Bandai Visual and licensed by Books Nippan (U.S. Rendentions in 1991, then in 1995 by Manga Entertainment).

A CGI feature film was released in 2004 titled Appleseed and directed by Shinji Aramaki. The sequel to this film, Appleseed Ex Machina, was released on October 20, 2007, in Japan and on March 11, 2008, in the United States as a direct-to-video film with Aramaki again directing and John Woo producing. In 2014, a reboot titled Appleseed Alpha was announced for a July 22, 2014, release on Blu-ray and DVD after a digital release on July 15, 2014.

A canceled anime television series known as Appleseed: Genesis (アップルシード ジェネシス, Appurushīdo Jeneshisu) was originally announced in 2005. The series was slated to be 26-episodes and scheduled to release in summer 2006. The TV series was officially unveiled at 2008 Tokyo International Anime Fair and was being produced by Radix Mobanimation anime studio. The TV series was being directed by Romanov Higa with Haruhiko Mikimoto as character design and Romi Park as voice actress for Deunan Knute. On September 26, 2008, the Robix Mobanimation studio filed a lawsuit against Micott & Basara production company for halting the production without reason and not paying for the production costs. On July 14, 2009, Miccot & Basara countersued Robix Mobanimation studio claiming that there was no unpaid production costs and that Radix unilaterally ended their discussion about the production. On April 18, 2012, the two reached a settlement agreement.

In 2011, a CGI-animated series Appleseed XIII premiered, directed by Takayuki Hamana. It was released in Japan as a 13-episode ONA series and were compiled into two theatrical feature films. The first feature film titled, Appleseed XIII: Tartaros was released on June 13, 2011. The second titled, Appleseed XIII: Ouranos was released on October 24, 2011. During the release of the feature films, limited edition first Blu-ray volumes were being sold in theaters and the episodes were being streamed online.

=== Games ===
A box set for using an Appleseed setting with WARPS (Wild Adventure Role Play System) RPG was released by Tsukuda Hobby on October 19, 1988. An action video game titled Appleseed: Oracle of Prometheus (アップルシード プロメテウスの神託, Appurushīdo Purometeusu no Shintaku) for the Super Famicom was released on August 26, 1994, and was published by Visit. A PlayStation 2 game titled Appleseed EX was developed by Sega and based on the 2004 film adaptation. The game was released in February 2007, as well as the Limited Box set. An online game known as Appleseed the Online was released on October 20, 2005; however servers closed on November 13, 2006. A second online game known as Appleseed Tactics was released on October 29, 2009. Servers closed on July 15, 2010.

== Reception ==
Appleseed won the 17th Seiun Award for Best Manga in 1986.

Reviews of the manga series have been seen as positive. Manga Review noted that Shirow's works on Appleseed are both cool and functional. Anime.com points out that the manga's storyline does not detract despite the combination of both action and humor. Helen McCarthy in 500 Essential Anime Movies stated that the manga "is packed with political, ecological, technical, and literary references and subtexts, but it's also an enjoyable science fiction adventure".

== Legacy ==
Director Neill Blomkamp has cited Appleseed's Briareos as an influence on the design of the eponymous character in his 2015 film, Chappie.

The French FÉLIN (Fantassin à Équipement et Liaisons Intégrés – Integrated Infantryman Equipment and Communications, an infantry combat system) has a firing capability directly inspired by Appleseed.
