= Shinji Aramaki =

Japanese anime director (born 1960)

- 荒牧 伸志
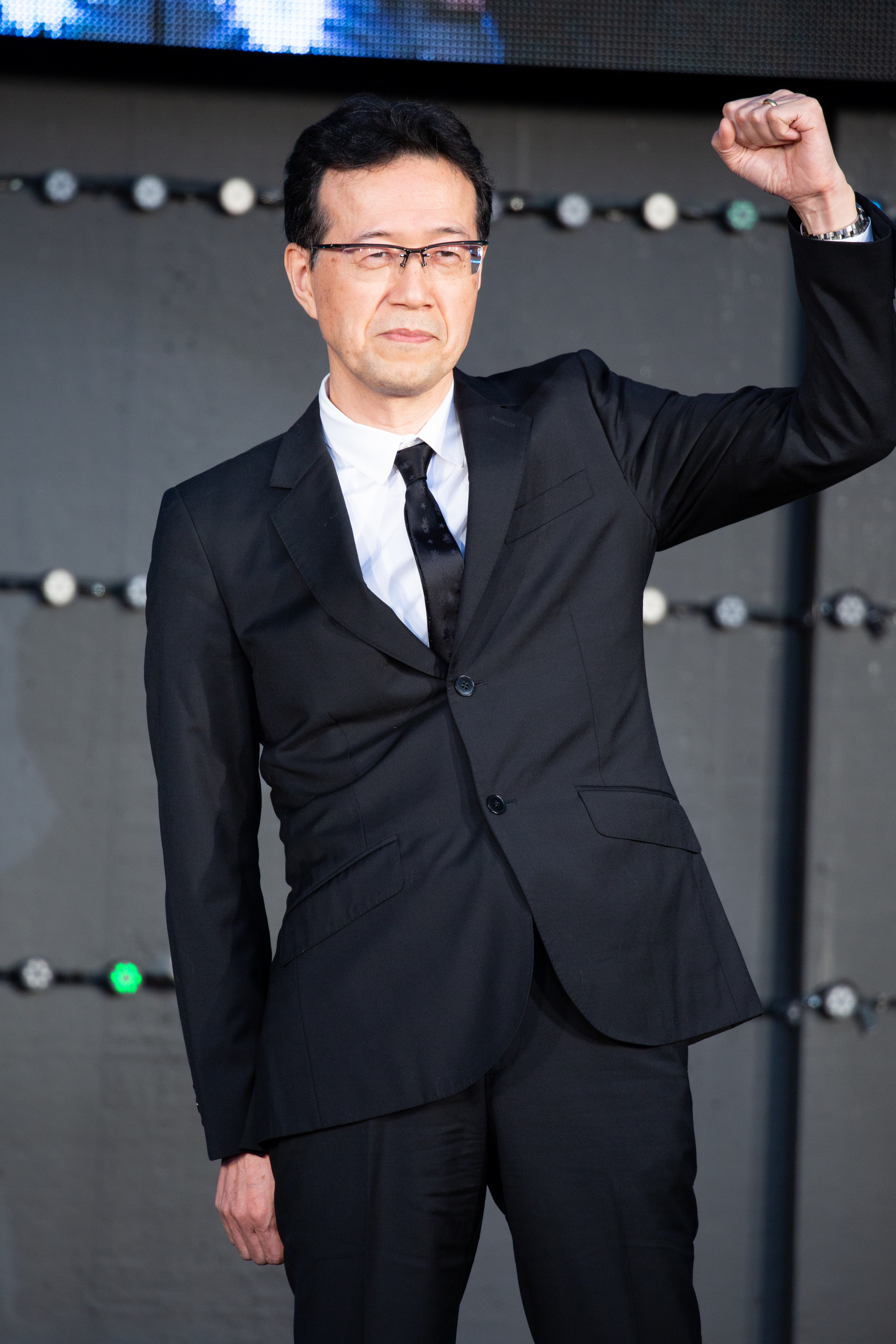
- Aramaki at the Ready Player One Japan premiere in 2018
- Born: 2 October 1960 (age 65); Fukuoka Prefecture, Japan
- Education: Okayama University
- Occupations: Anime director and mechanical designer

Shinji Aramaki (荒牧 伸志, Aramaki Shinji; born 2 October 1960) is a Japanese anime director and mechanical designer from Fukuoka Prefecture. He graduated from Fukuoka Prefectural Fukuoka High School and Okayama University. He was a member of Artmic and is currently the Chief Creative Officer (CCO) at Sola Digital Arts. He is a leading figure in 3DCG animation in Japan.

== History ==
From middle school through high school, Aramaki was influenced by Space Battleship Yamato, Mobile Suit Gundam, and Star Wars, and aspired to a career in the visual arts. During his time at Okayama University, he was a member of the manga club. One of his best-known works from his time in the manga club was the self-produced animation Moonstruck Artemis.

Aramaki himself stated that he did not have a particular desire to work in the animation industry, but rather went into it because he could draw pictures and because the industry had a wide range of opportunities. He does not distinguish between animation and live-action genres, and says that the spread of digital technology has made it easier for him to work in the animation and live-action fields, as the boundary between the two has disappeared. He is particularly well known for his work on anime featuring mecha of the sort that can transform into powered exoskeletons and motorcycles.

In 2004, he directed Appleseed, the world's first 3D live anime that introduced motion capture, which had a great impact on creators not only in Japan but also around the world.

In October 2011, Aramaki participated in a panel discussion at the VFX-JAPAN Kickoff Meeting.

Shinji and Kenji Kamiyama directed the initial season of Blade Runner: Black Lotus, an anime for Adult Swim and Crunchyroll.

== Work ==
=== As director ===
- Metal Skin Panic MADOX-01 (director, 1987)
- Megazone 23 III (director, 1989, with Ken'ichi Yatagai)
- Genesis Survivor Gaiarth (director, 1992–1993)
- Appleseed (director, 2004)
- Appleseed Ex Machina (director, 2007)
- Viper's Creed (chief director, 2009)
- Halo Legends, episode The Package (director, 2010)
- Starship Troopers: Invasion (director, 2012)
- Harlock: Space Pirate (director, 2013)
- Appleseed Alpha (director, 2014)
- Evangelion: Another Impact (director, 2014)
- Starship Troopers: Traitor of Mars (director, 2017, with Masaru Matsumoto)
- Ultraman (director, 2019–2023, with Kenji Kamiyama)
- Ghost in the Shell: SAC 2045 (director, 2020–2022, with Kenji Kamiyama)
- Blade Runner: Black Lotus (director, 2021–2022, with Kenji Kamiyama)

=== As designer ===
- Genesis Climber MOSPEADA (mechanical design, 1983–1984)
- Pole Position (mechanical design, 1984)
- The Transformers (mechanical design, 1984–1987)
- Megazone 23 (mechanical design, 1985–1989)
- M.A.S.K. (mechanical design, 1985–1986)
- Bubblegum Crisis (production design, 1987–1991)
- Metal Skin Panic MADOX-01 (mechanical design, 1988)
- The New Adventures of He-Man (mechanical design, 1990)
- Bubblegum Crash (production design, 1991)
- Genesis Survivor Gaiarth (mechanical design, 1992–1993)
- Gasaraki (mechanical design, 1998–1999)
- Bubblegum Crisis Tokyo 2040 (mecha design, 1998–1999)
- Digimon Tamers (CG design, 2001–2002)
- s-CRY-ed (design works, 2001)
- Crush Gear Turbo (mechanical design, 2001–2003)
- Witch Hunter Robin (design works, 2002)
- Wolf's Rain (mechanical design, 2003)
- Astro Boy (2003 TV series) (mechanical design, 2003–2004)
- Fullmetal Alchemist (production design, 2003–2004)
- Mobile Suit Gundam MS IGLOO (mechanical design, 2004–2009)
- Naruto the Movie: Ninja Clash in the Land of Snow (mechanical design, 2004)
- Sugar Sugar Rune (makai art concept, 2005–2006)
- Project Blue Earth SOS (mechanical design, 2006)
- Reideen (mechanical design, 2007)
- Kishin Taisen Gigantic Formula (mechanical design (Nephthys-IX), 2007)
- Soul Eater (conceptual design, 2008)
- Halo Legends (2010), episodes Prototype (power suit designer) and The Package (mechanical designer)
- Star Driver: Kagayaki no Takuto (conceptual design, 2010–2011)
- Fullmetal Alchemist: The Sacred Star of Milos (mechanical design, 2011)
- Tenkai Knights (concept design, 2013)
- Blade Runner Black Out 2022 (spinner design, 2017)

=== Other ===
- Kappa (CG design)
- Ping Pong (table-tennis scene CG)
- Genocyber (producer, 1994)
- Sonic Unleashed (CG movie director)
- Gasaraki (storyboard writer of episode 25, 1998–1999)
- Halo Legends (creative advisor, 2010)
