= Prometheus (Zach) =

Sculpture by Jan Zach in Eugene, Oregon, U.S.

- The sculpture in 2015
- Artist: Jan Zach
- Year: 1958
- Type: Sculpture
- Medium: Cast iron
- Subject: Prometheus
- Dimensions: 2.6 m × 1.7 m × 0.91 m (8.5 ft × 5.5 ft × 3 ft)
- Condition: "Treatment needed" (1994)
- Location: Eugene, Oregon, United States; 44.04460°N 123.07727°W
- Owner: University of Oregon

Prometheus is an outdoor 1958 cast iron sculpture depicting the mythological figure Prometheus by Jan Zach, installed north of the Jordan Schnitzer Museum of Art on the University of Oregon campus in Eugene, Oregon, in the United States.

== Description and history ==
The Smithsonian Institution describes the sculpture as "two abstract figures with intrabody appendages supported by tripod-like legs". It measures approximately 8.5 feet (2.6 m) x 5.5 feet (1.7 m) x 3 feet (0.91 m) and is set on a concrete base that measures approximately 3.5 feet (1.1 m) x 3 feet (0.91 m) x 3 feet (0.91 m). A plaque on the front of the base reads: PROMETHEUS / JAN ZACH – SCULPTOR. The sculpture's condition was deemed "treatment needed" by the Smithsonian's "Save Outdoor Sculpture!" program in July 1993.

== See also ==
- 1958 in art
- Greek mythology in western art and literature
