= David Matranga =

American voice actor

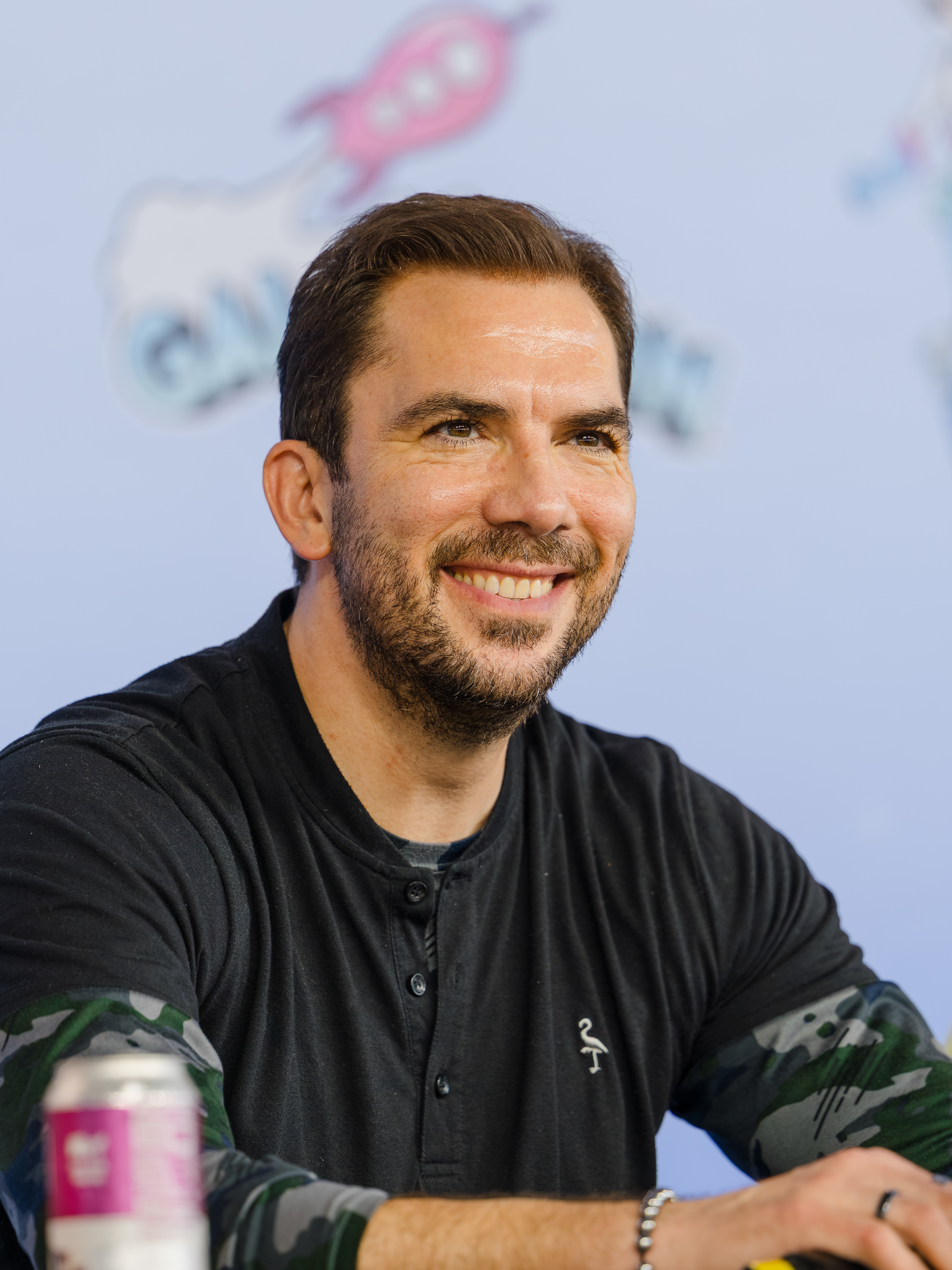
- Matranga at GalaxyCon Nashville in 2026
- Occupation: Voice actor
- Years active: 1998–present
- Agent: Pastorini-Bosby Talent

David Matranga is an American voice actor who works primarily for English dubbed anime. Matranga is best known as the voice of Shoto Todoroki in My Hero Academia, Teru Minamoto in Toilet-Bound Hanako-kun, Hideki Hinata in Angel Beats, Genjo Sanzo in Saiyuki, Orphen in Sorcerous Stabber Orphen, Bertholdt Hoover in Attack on Titan, Tomoya Okazaki in Clannad series, Takumi Usui in Maid Sama, Ghost in Halo Legends, Briareos in Appleseed, Yu Himura in EF, God Serena in Fairy Tail, and Ken Masters in Street Fighter 6.

== Filmography ==
=== Anime ===
2000

- Generator Gawl – Security Guard 1, Spider Generator

2001

- Orphen – Orphen

2002

- Chance Pop Session – Kaito Kosaka, Keiji, additional voices
- Steel Angel Kurumi – Kamihito Kasuga

2003

- Colorful – Hirokawa, Jamie
- Dirty Pair: Project Eden – Carson D. Carson (ADV dub)
- Martian Successor Nadesico: The Motion Picture – Prince of Darkness – Yamasaki
- Saiyuki – Genjo Sanzo
- Orphen 2: Revenge – Orphen
- The Samurai – Takeshi Chimatsuri
- The Super Milk-chan Show – Robodog, Ario the Baby Ant, Himself (live-action scenes)

2005

- Elfen Lied – Ohmori (Ep. 10), Mail Staff (Ep. 11), Police Officer B (Ep. 9)
- Gilgamesh – Decem
- Ghost Stories – Racist Cabbie

2006

- Nanaka 6/17 – Onigiri

2007

- Devil May Cry: The Animated Series – Issac (Ep. 5)
- Le Chevalier D'Eon – d'Eon de Beaumont
- Kaiji: Ultimate Survivor – Yūji Endō

2008

- 5 Centimeters Per Second – Takaki Tono (ADV dub)
- Appleseed: Ex Machina – Briareos

2009

- Canaan – Minorikawa

2010

- Angel Beats! – Hinata Hideki
- Canaan – Minorikawa
- Clannad – Tomoya Okazaki
- Halo Legends - Ghost (Prototype), Joseph (Homecoming)
- Legends of the Dark King – Souga
- Xam'd Lost Memories – Furuichi

2011

- Demon King Daimao – Yozo Hattori
- Guin Saga – Istavan
- Highschool of the Dead – Hisashi Igo, Additional Voices
- Loups=Garous – Touji Kunugi
- Mardock Scramble – Dr. Easter
- Samurai Girls – Muneakira Yagyu (as Ben Wabal)

2012

- The Book of Bantorra – Mokkania
- Broken Blade – Loggin G. Garf Ensance, Loquis
- Children Who Chase Lost Voices – Ryuji Morisaki
- Dream Eater Merry – Pharos Hercules
- Ef: A Fairy Tale of the Two – Yu Himura
- Hakuōki – Keisuke Yamanami
- Heaven's Memo Pad – Hiroaki 'Hiro' Kuwabara
- Intrigue in the Bakumatsu – Irohanihoheto – Kozo Shirauni
- Majikoi! – Oh! Samurai Girls – Kuroko Haguro, Ryuhei Itagaki
- Needless – Adam Arclight
- Penguindrum – Kenzen Takakura, Sahei Nasume, Yosuke Yamashita
- Starship Troopers: Invasion – Johnny Rico
- Towa no Quon – Cyborg Epsilon/Shun Kazami
- Un-Go – Makiro Serada (Ep. 0)

2013

- Another – Shoji Kubodera
- Appleseed XIII – Briareos
- Btooom! – Masahito Date
- Colorful: The Movie – Mr. Sawada
- Fairy Tail the Movie: Phoenix Priestess – Geese
- The Garden of Words – Mr. Ito
- Gatchaman – Alan (Sentai Dub, Ep. 2), Count Los Mandos (Sentai Dub, Ep. 2)
- Girls und Panzer – Shinzaburou
- Hiiro no Kakera – Yuichi Komura
- Horizon in the Middle of Nowhere II – Innocentuis, Nenji, Noriki
- Inu x Boku SS – Kagerou Shoukiin
- Kids on the Slope – Junichi Katsuragi
- Kokoro Connect – Ryuzuen Goto/Heartseed
- Medaka Box – Umumichi Yakushima, Hakama Shiranui
- Momo: The Girl God of Death – Matsumoto (Ep. 6)
- Nyan Koi! – Kouta Kawamura
- One Piece – Puzzle, Shu (Funimation dub)
- Rurouni Kenshin – New Kyoto Arc – Choju Sawagejo, Usui Uonuma, Soldier Bob
- Say "I Love You". – Daichi Kurosawa, Yamoto's Big Brother
- S•A: Special A – Aoi Ogata, Nakamura, Sakura's Dad
- Starship Troopers: Invasion – Johnny Rico
- Tokyo Magnitude 8.0 – Seiji Onozawa
- Wolf Children – The Wolfman
- Space Pirate Captain Harlock – Captain Harlock
- This Boy Caught a Merman – Isaki

2014

- AKB0048 next stage – Chieri's Father
- Appleseed Alpha – Briareos
- Attack on Titan – Bertholdt Hoover
- Code:Breaker – Hitomi
- From the New World – Shisei Kaburagi
- Hakkenden: Eight Dogs of the East – Rio Satomi
- Karneval – Akari
- Log Horizon – Rodrick
- Majestic Prince – Prince Jiart
- Psycho-Pass – Koichi Ashikaga (Ep. 8)
- Red Data Girl – Yukimasa Sagara
- Sunday Without God – Julie Sakuma Dmitriyevich
- Tamako Market – Kunio Yaobi
- No Matter How I Look at It, It's You Guys' Fault I'm Not Popular! – Tomoki Kuroki
- Diabolik Lovers – Richter

2015

- Haikyuu!! – Yutaro Kindaichi
- Akame ga Kill! – Wave
- Attack on Titan: Junior High – Bertholdt Hoover
- Ghost in the Shell: The New Movie – Osamu Fujimoto
- Magical Warfare – Kazuma Ryuusenji
- Muv-Luv Alternative: Total Eclipse – Jerzy Sandek
- Maid Sama! – Takumi Usui
- Dramatical Murder – Koujaku

2016

- Brothers Conflict – Subaru Asahina
- Hetalia: The World Twinkle – Hutt River, Pope Clement VII
- Joker Game – Odagiri
- My Hero Academia – Shoto Todoroki
- My Love Story!! – Koki Ichinose
- Parasyte -the maxim- – Mita
- Planetarian: The Reverie of a Little Planet – The Junker
- Tokyo ESP – Toru Kanze

2017

- Classroom of the Elite – Manabu Horikita
- Kuroko's Basketball – Nash Gold Jr.

2018

- Mr. Tonegawa – Yūji Endō
- Battlerite – Zander
- Death March to the Parallel World Rhapsody – Jon Belton
- Hitorijime My Hero – Kousuke Ohshiba
- High School DxD Hero – Belzard
- Junji Ito Collection – Iwasaki (Ep. 2)
- UQ Holder! – Asura Tu, Zenki

2019

- Boogiepop and Others – Echoes
- Cop Craft – Kei Matoba
- Dragon Ball Super: Broly – Male Saiyan B, Male Saiyan Guard B, Male Frieza Crew A, Male Saiyan General A
- Fairy Tail – God Serena
- A Certain Magical Index III – Knight Leader

2020

- Plunderer – Jail Murdoch
- Arte – Matei
- The Millionaire Detective Balance: Unlimited – Teppei Yumoto
- Shirobako – Sugesuke Enjō
- Sorcerous Stabber Orphen – Orphen
- Toilet-Bound Hanako-kun – Minamoto Teru

2021

- Full Dive – Shouhei Aida
- Gleipnir – Kaito
- SSSS.Dynazenon – Onija
- The Prince of Tennis II: Hyotei vs. Rikkai Game of Future – Wakashi Hiyoshi
- The Saint's Magic Power is Omnipotent – Johan Valdec
- Moriarty the Patriot – George Lestrade
- Sonny Boy – Hayato
- Re-Main – Shūgo Amihama
- 2.43: Seiin High School Boys Volleyball Team – Yūhi Sawatari
- Mieruko-chan – Zen Toono
- JoJo's Bizarre Adventure: Stone Ocean – Jonhgalli A

2022

- Tomodachi Game – Yuichi
- One Piece – Charlotte Cracker
- Smile of the Arsnotoria the Animation – Zwingli
- Blue Lock – Ikki
- Spy × Family – Daybreak
- Ya Boy Kongming! – Owner Kobayashi

2023

- Buddy Daddies – Rei
- Trigun Stampede – Nicholas D. Wolfwood
- Sweet Reincarnation – Casserole
- The Ancient Magus' Bride Season 2 – Narcisse Maugham
- Sacrificial Princess and the King of Beasts – Fenrir

2024

- My Instant Death Ability Is So Overpowered – Yogiri
- MF Ghost – Hiroya Okuyama

2025

- Zenshu – Soldier
- Honey Lemon Soda – Uka's Dad
- Ameku M.D.: Doctor Detective – Naruse
- Lazarus – Dr. Skinner
- Dealing with Mikadono Sisters Is a Breeze – Mr. Mikadono
- To Be Hero X (Donghua) – X
- The Dark History of the Reincarnated Villainess – Ginoford

2026

- Sentenced to Be a Hero – Xylo
- The Saga of Tanya the Evil (Season 2) – Lt. Col. William Douglas Drake

=== Video games ===
2020

- Fire Emblem Heroes – Knoll
- My Hero One's Justice 2 – Shoto Todoroki

2022

- Live A Live – Pike, Pancho, Captain Square

2023

- Fire Emblem Engage – Zelkov
- Romancing SaGa 2: Revenge of the Seven – Noel
- Street Fighter 6 – Ken Masters

2025

- Fatal Fury: City of the Wolves – Ken Masters

== Filmography ==
=== Television ===
- Law & Order – Peter Griggs (Episode: Murder Book)
- Cruel Summer – Matt Donovan (Episode: Off with a Bang)

== Awards and nominations ==
Year	Award	Category	Role	Result
2013	2nd Annual Behind the Voice Actors (BTVA) Anime Dub Awards	Best Male Supporting Vocal Performance in an Anime Movie/Special	Wolf Man (Wolf Children)	Won
