= PM-43 and PM-68 mine =

Finnish anti-personnel mines

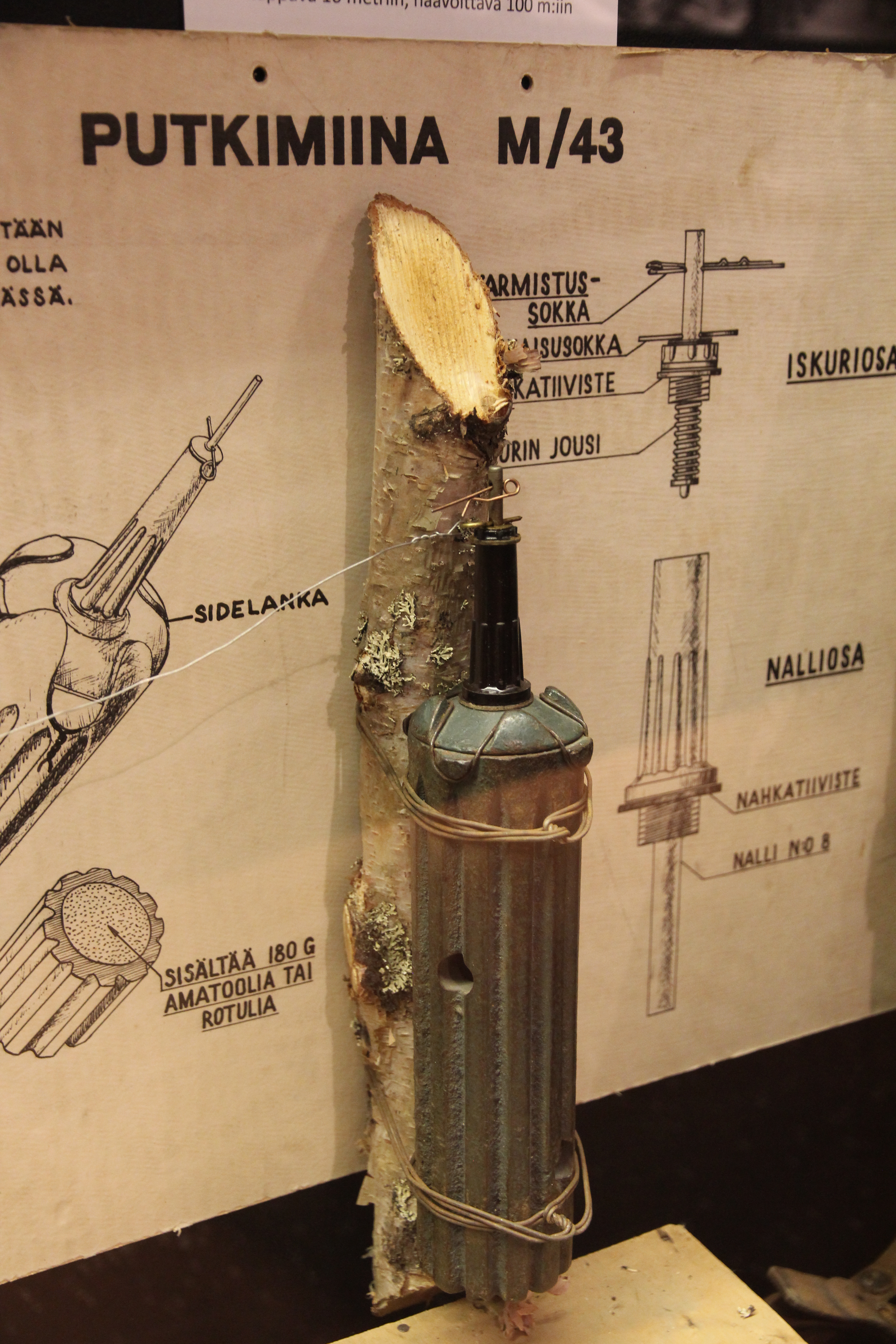
Putkimiina M/43

The PM-43 (Putkimiina m/43) and PM-68 (Putkimiina m/68) are Finnish anti-personnel fragmentation mines.

The PM-43 has a long cylindrical steel body, with heavy fragmentation grooves. It has been used with variety of fuzes including the Model 43, VS-70, and US-65. Currently, it is used with the VS-86 tripwire fuze. The mine is normally mounted in a tree.

The PM-68 is similar but uses a body formed from a tightly coiled spring, and currently uses a VS-91 fuze, although it can be used with any of the fuzes used with the PM-43.

After Finland joined the Ottawa Treaty, the Finnish Defence Forces began a process to destroy the mines. The work was completed in 2015.

== Specifications ==
- Diameter: 60 mm approx
- Length: 180 mm approx
- Weight: 2 kg
- Explosive content: 0.18 kg consisting of three 0.06 kg cylindrical blocks of TNT
