= Appleseed XIII =

Original video animation

- A promotional graphic for the series

アップルシード XIII (Appurushiido Sātiin)
- Genre: Action; Science fiction; War
- Original net animation
- Directed by: Takayuki Hamana
- Produced by: Katsuji Morishita; Hiroki Kawashima; Shinichi Ikeda
- Written by: Junichi Fujisaku
- Music by: Conisch
- Studio: Production I.G (Note: Co-animated by: Episode 1: Dynamo Pictures; Episode 2: Welz Animation Studios; Episode 3: Premium Agency; Episode 4: Mozoo & Keica; Episode 5: DandeLion Animation Studio; Episode 6: Koo-Ki; Episode 7: Frameworks Entertainment; Episode 8: Garage Film; Episode 9: D1FX; Episode 10: Kantana Animation Studios; Episode 11: N-Design; Episode 12: Jinni's Animation Studio; Episode 13: P.I.C.S.)
- Licensed by: Crunchyroll
- Released: June 3, 2011 – January 25, 2012
- Runtime: 22 minutes (each)
- Episodes: 13
- Anime film

Appleseed XIII: Tartaros
- Directed by: Takayuki Hamana
- Produced by: Katsuji Morishita; Hiroki Kawashima; Shinichi Ikeda
- Written by: Junichi Fujisaku
- Music by: Conisch
- Studio: Production I.G
- Licensed by: Crunchyroll
- Released: June 13, 2011
- Runtime: 100 minutes
- Anime film

Appleseed XIII: Ouranos
- Directed by: Takayuki Hamana
- Produced by: Katsuji Morishita; Hiroki Kawashima; Shinichi Ikeda
- Written by: Junichi Fujisaku
- Music by: Conisch
- Studio: Production I.G
- Licensed by: Crunchyroll
- Released: October 24, 2011
- Runtime: 100 minutes
- Manga
- Written by: Akira Miyagawa
- Published by: Kodansha
- Imprint: Afternoon KC
- Magazine: Monthly Afternoon
- Original run: October 25, 2011 – April 25, 2013
- Volumes: 3
- icon

Appleseed XIII (Japanese: アップルシードXIII, Hepburn: Appurushiido Sātiin) is a 2011 Japanese CGI anime adaptation of Masamune Shirow's science fiction manga series Appleseed. Composed of 13 episodes, the series retold the exploits of E-S.W.A.T. member Deunan and her cyborg partner Briareos. The series was produced by Production I.G and under the direction of Takayuki Hamana with Junichi Fujisaku as script supervisor. All 13 episodes were compiled into two feature-length films. The first feature film, titled Appleseed XIII: Tartaros, was announced by Shochiku and released on June 13, 2011. The second film, Appleseed XIII: Ouranos, was released on October 24, 2011.

A North American release of the TV series was released in June 2013. It was licensed by Funimation.

== Plot ==
=== Setting ===
Following World War III, a global-scale conflict fought with non-nuclear weapons that almost halved the earth's population, the city-nation of Olympus stands as a beacon of hope in a world of chaos. The utopian metropolis is governed by Gaia, a vast artificial intelligence, and administered by genetically engineered humanoids known as bioroids.

Although Olympus seems like a peaceful city, various conflicts lurk underneath, threatening to overturn the delicately balanced peace of this so-called utopia.

=== Story ===
Deunan, a young female special agent, and Briareos, a veteran cyborg soldier, are both partners and lovers, as well as members of E-S.W.A.T., the elite special forces serving Olympus. They are deployed wherever trouble strikes. Conspiracy, terrorism, deadly military weapons technology, greedy corporations, and power-hungry politicians: these are just some of the threats that Deunan and Briareos must contend with as they fight to protect Olympus and conduct their personal quest to find Eden in the wasteland.

As Olympus is carrying forward the Ark Project, aimed to preserve the future of human kind under bioroids' supervision, the Human Liberation Front is strongly opposing the plan and the very existence of the bioroids. The Front is supported by a radical fringe known as the Argonauts, a terrorist group hiding inside a legendary self-propelled city-fortress. But very little is known about the Argonauts, and their leader, Alcides is a man who reportedly died when the maritime industrial nation of Poseidon bombed the Argonauts' fortress, 20 years before.

=== Characters ===
Deunan Knute (デュナン・ナッツ, Dyunan Nattsu)
Voiced by: Maaya Sakamoto (Japanese); Luci Christian (English)
Deunan is a young woman of both African and Caucasian descent and the daughter of an American Securities officer named Carl Knute. Her mother was gunned down for crossing a street designated for white people. After that day, her father began drilling her in combat and survival skills to the point where she became a mercenary. During her training, she encountered Briareos, a former puppet for a KGB linked terrorist group. The two began training together and eventually became lovers.
Briareos (ブリアレオス, Buriareosu) / [Hecatonchires Cyborg System] (ヘカトンケイレス, Hekatonkeiresu)
Voiced by: Kōichi Yamadera (Japanese); David Matranga (English)
Originally, an African man from the Mediterranean, Briareos was used as a terrorist by the KGB while still a child. He sought political asylum in the former USA after killing the unit's commander of operations - for which he was put on the international "most wanted" list as an assassin. After meeting an agent from Special Security Forces, he began operating as a partner with the man's daughter, Deunan Knute. Caught in an explosion, the 31-year-old survived only by undergoing a full cyborg body replacement - and has been making modifications ever since. Briareos is a Hekatonkheires Combat Model cyborg.
Hitomi (ヒトミ)
Voiced by: Mikako Takahashi (Japanese); Emily Neves (English)
Yoshitsune Miyamoto (宮本 義経)
Voiced by: Hiro Shimono (Japanese); Micah Solusod (English)
Athena Aerios (宮本 義経)
Voiced by: Sakiko Tamagawa (Japanese); Allison Sumrall (English)
Nike (ニケ, Nikei)
Voiced by: Mayumi Yanigasawa (Japanese); Shelley Calene-Black (English)
Deia Chades
Voiced by: Naomi Shindo (Japanese); Monica Rial (English)

== Media ==
=== Anime ===
Takayuki Hamana directed the anime at various companies in cooperation with Production I.G. Junichi Fujisaku supervised and co-wrote the scripts, and Takayuki Goto designed the characters based on Shirow's original work. Atsushi Takeuchi led mechanical design efforts.

Appleseed XIII was released in Japan as a 13-episode OVA series and was compiled into two theatrical feature films. The first feature film, titled Appleseed XIII: Tartaros (アップルシードXIII ～遺言～, Appurushiido Sātiin: Yuigon), was released on June 13, 2011. The second, titled Appleseed XIII: Ouranos (アップルシード XIII ~預言~, Appurushiido Sātiin: Yogen), was released on October 24, 2011. During the release of the feature films, limited edition first Blu-ray volumes were being sold in theatres and the episodes were being streamed online.

A 2-disc soundtrack was released under catalog number KICA-3146 on October 26, 2011, by King Records (Japan).

The names of episodes 1 to 12 are a direct reference to the Twelve Labours of Hercules.

==== Episodes ====
No.	Title	Original release date
1	"The Nemean Lion" "Rakuen no owari" (Japanese: 楽園の終わり)	June 3, 2011
Deunan, Briareos, and the rest of Olympus' ESWAT force fend off an Argonaut attack.
2	"The Augean Stables" "Toraware no Yurika go" (Japanese: 囚われのゆりか ご)	June 13, 2011
An airplane carrying 3,000 bioroids is hijacked by the Human Liberation Front. When it changes course towards Tartarus, Deunan and Briareos' day off is cut short. But once they enter the plane they discover that the hostages are not quite what they seem.
3	"The Ceryneian Hind" "Itsuwari no omokage" (Japanese: 偽りの面影)	June 13, 2011
On their day off, Briareos' offer of a roadtrip is brushed off by Deunan who says she's going shopping with Hitomi, but when he goes to see Yoshi, Hitomi arrives. Turns out Deunan is having her hand gun serviced by a gunsmith who looks very much like her late father. Whilst this is going on a number of bioroids are committing suicide, something that should not be possible, which means a killer could be on the loose.
4	"The Cattle of Geryon" "Tanpopo to shōjo" (Japanese: タンポポと少女)	August 5, 2011
The episode begins with Deunan trialling a new police robot called a Kottos for inclusion in ESWAT. Her initial assessment is that they would be good for nothing but bullet shields. The scene then changes to the kidnapping of the daughter of a political aide and his wife. By complete chance a Kottos comes upon the van the girl was kidnapped in and rescues her, with the rest of the episode showing how it becomes more individual to other Kottos robots.
5	"The Cretan Bull" "Senketsu no bōrei" (Japanese: 潜血の亡霊)	August 10, 2011
The episode begins with Deunan hallucinating and having nightmares, she then wakes up, but after a couple of minutes attacks Dia, biting her neck like a vampire. The episode then spends some time explaining how Deunan was bitten, before showing her escape and then rescue from the infected victims. The bio-weapon used is also named after its first victim, Deunan's rescuer called Erinyes (named after the Greek goddesses of vengeance). This episode is about the bridge between light and darkness and the decisions we make.
6	"The Erymanthian Boar" "Sabiiro no rakuen" (Japanese: 錆色の楽園)	September 2, 2011
Deunan is tasked with infiltrating the Argonauts, and along the way she encounters a number of people with links to the Argonauts of Greek Myth (brother's called Castor & Pollux) until she meets Hyllus (in Greek mythology Alcides was an alternate name for Heracles (Hercules) who had a son named Hyllus). At the end Alcides seems to reveal himself, and the Stymphalean (Bronze) Bird, an interstellar landmate is launched.
7	"The Stymphalean Birds" "Seidō no tori" (Japanese: 青銅の鳥)	September 7, 2011
After Deia has returned to Poseidon, and Deunan has been kidnapped by the pilot of the Stymphalean, ESWAT tries to crack the encoding of the command signal. On realising that the signal is Deunan's heartbeat, Briareos is deployed to take her out, but not all is as it seems as the real pilot of the Stymphalean bird is revealed.
8	"The Mares of Diomedes" "Dīpu daibu" (Japanese: ディープダイブ)	November 4, 2011
Deunan is specifically requested as part of the security team for a goodwill ambassador from Poseidon, however the sub comes under attack and Deunan and the ambassador are the only ones left alive. At the end the ambassador is revealed to be someone from the recent past.
9	"The Girdle of Hippolyta" "Joō no takara" (Japanese: 女王の宝)	November 23, 2011
After the ambassador is shockingly revealed to be Deia, ESWAT are tasked with preventing the death of her next victim who it is revealed is one of 10 potential candidates for leader of the Ark Project. As 7 of them have already been killed by Deia (known or implied), she is watched by ESWAT when she meets with the diplomat, however her target is still killed at the end of the episode. Intermixed with this episode are flashbacks to the death of Deunan's mother.
10	"The Lernaean Hydra" "Sekizō no in de" (Japanese: 石像の陰で)	December 16, 2011
ESWAT are tasked with 24-hour protection of the remaining candidates, with Deunan and Briareos being assigned to a sculptor called Eurys. This episode is more about reflection, however it is shown that Deia has been implanted with the ability to process on the same level as Briareos and uses a 2nd Stymphalean landmate as a decoy drawing everyone away from Eurys.
11	"The Apples of Hesperides" "Saigo no hitori" (Japanese: 最後の一人)	December 21, 2011
Deia commences her attack on the last candidate for the Ark Project, simultaneously controlling a number of insect like robots as well as two Stymphalean landmates. After it is revealed that all of the bioroid candidates carried Alcides genes, a particular casualty causes Deia to give up, and she receives justice of a sort.
12	"The Capture of Cerberus" "Fukushū no kanata ni" (Japanese: 復讐の彼方に)	January 20, 2012
With all of the candidates dead, Deia's full name is revealed to be Dhianeira which is a reference to both Heracles second wife, Deianira and also an Amazon killed by him during his quest for the girdle of Hippolyta. Deia is forced by her partner to retake control of the Stymphalean and go after the baby that's with Hitomi as it's revealed to be carrying Alcides genes. However Deia willingly surrenders but is impaled on a large sword like structure and after her partner reports to an unknown person on Poseidon he is blown up.
13	"Paradeisos" "Rakuen" (Japanese: 楽園)	January 25, 2012
After the Deia incident, ESWAT is called in to supervise a diagnostic check of the Gaia Computer's systems. Soon after, unmanned Landmates and Auto Insectors start to malfunction.

=== Manga ===
A manga adaptation by Akira Miyagawa, titled Appleseed XIII (アップルシード・サーティーン, Appurushiido Sātiin), was serialized in Kodansha's seinen manga magazine Monthly Afternoon from October 25, 2011, to April 25, 2013. Its chapters were collected into three tankōbon volumes, released from April 23, 2012, to May 23, 2013.

==== Volumes ====
No.	Release date	ISBN
1	April 23, 2012	978-4-06-387820-2
2	December 21, 2012	978-4-06-387857-8
3	May 23, 2013	978-4-06-387888-2
