= Appleseed (1988 film) =

1988 OVA film by Kazuyoshi Katayama

- Cover of Appleseed, the OVA

アップルシード
- Genre: Science fiction action
- Original video animation
- Directed by: Kazuyoshi Katayama
- Produced by: Tōru Miura; Atsushi Sugita; Masaki Sawanobori; Tarō Maki; Hiroaki Inoue
- Written by: Kazuyoshi Katayama
- Music by: Norimasa Yamanaka
- Studio: Gainax, AIC, Bandai, Movic, Tohokushinsha
- Licensed by: AUS: Manga Entertainment; UK: Manga Entertainment; US: Discotek Media
- Released: April 21, 1988
- Runtime: 70 minutes

Appleseed (Japanese: アップルシード, Hepburn: Appurushīdo) is a Japanese OVA adaptation of the manga of the same name created by Masamune Shirow. The anime takes place in a non-determined future. The anime, produced by Gainax, departs greatly from the manga's storyline, sharing only the characters and setting.

== Plot ==
After World War III, the General Management Control Office constructs an experimental city known as Olympus. It is inhabited by humans, cyborgs, and bioroids. Bioroids are genetically engineered beings created to serve Mankind. They oversee all the administration duties of Olympus. Olympus was meant to be a utopian society, but for some, it feels more like a cage. Charon Mautholos, an Olympus city police officer, is one of the many who feel that way. Charon secretly conspires with a terrorist, A. J. Sebastian, to destroy Gaia, a super computer that runs the various utilities and networks of Olympus. Out to stop them are Olympus City ESWAT (Enhanced SWAT) team members Deunan Knute and Briareos Hecatonchires. Deunan and Briareos are determined to stop the terrorist plot by any means necessary.

A.J. Sebastian and Charon have plotted to disable Gaia, the computer system which controls Olympus' infrastructure, including the override circuits which safeguard Multi-ped Cannon. To do so, they stage a raid on the facility where bioroids are created, creating havoc by killing and by arson. However, it is discovered that the attack is just a cover for stealing information on one particular bioroid, Hitomi, a friend of Deunan and Briareos, whose DNA is the genetic key which will cause Gaia to shut down. The "locks" are a handful of kiosks, scattered across the city, and the city director orders all but one destroyed, and a heavy guard placed around the one which remains.

Sebastian converts to his full-military configuration and steals Multi-ped Cannon, while Charon—wearing a Cadmos suit which has been made faster through the removal of half the armor—takes Hitomi to the one surviving kiosk. With his faster suit, he is able to get her to the portal, through a hail of gunfire which goes through the decreased armor. As Charon dies, a terrified, confused Hitomi backs into the kiosk, launching the shutdown process. To cover his theft of the Multi-ped Cannon, Sebastian uses the tank and its weapons to cause damage in the city, while the director and Deunan rush to try to restart Gaia, by destroying the circuit module which keeps the system offline. However, Deunan's pistol is damaged and her right (shooting) hand is injured by the databank defense system. The director hands over her own pistol, trusting Deunan's skill more than her own, even with an unfamiliar weapon and shooting left-handed. With her last round of ammunition, Deunan is able to hit the module with pistol fire, and Gaia immediately disables the Multi-ped Cannon. Sebastian is killed, Charon is mourned, and life goes on.

== Characters ==
Briareos Hecatonchires is a cyborg, mostly human but with enhanced physical strength and an integrated head/helmet, with multiple camera eyes. The most obvious feature is the long sensor antennae which resemble the ears of a rabbit, but which hold such things as a camera eye which allows him to see around corners without exposing himself. They are hinged at the base, and move in response to Briareos' mood. His name is transliterated as Bularios in the English dub.

Deunan Knute is a natural human. However, she is skilled in operating her "Guges"-model "Landmate", an exoskeleton-armor powersuit, more powerful and responsive than the standard police-issue "Cadmos" Landmates, and the only type which can take the punishment which she gives.

Charon Mautholos, a natural human like Deunan, is a friend of hers and of Briareos, but he has become disenchanted with life in Olympus following the suicide of his wife, an artist who felt stifled by the pre-programmed environment. Charon becomes bitter, and believes that it is his duty to liberate natural humans from this unnatural environment.

A.J. Sebastian is also a foreign cyborg, with enhanced strength and interchangeable limbs, whose mission is to steal a huge, flying armored tank (called the Multi-ped Cannon) and deliver it to a strike force which flies across the border in support.

== Cast ==
Role	Japanese	English
Deunan Knute	Masako Katsuki	Larissa Murray
Briareos Hecatonchires	Yoshisada Sakaguchi	William Roberts
Athena Areios	Toshiko Sawada	Lorelei King
Charon Mautholos	Toshio Furukawa	Alan Marriott (as David Reynolds)
Fleia Mautholos	Mika Doi	
A.J. Sebastian	Norio Wakamoto	Vincent Marzello
Hitomi	Mayumi Shou	Julia Brahms
Yoshitsune Fujimoto	Yuji Mitsuya	Adam Henderson
Nike	Kumiko Takizawa	
Nereus	Tamio Oki	
Lt. Bronx (Police Chief)	Yuzuru Fujimoto	
Legislator Woman	Mari Yokoo	
Video Phone Cop	Kenichi Ono	
Christopher Evans (SWAT Team Member)	Takao Oyama	
Gaia Operator	Nobuyuki Furuta	
News Anchor	Masayuki Omoro	
Police Officer A	Yasunori Matsumoto	
Terrorist Leader	Koji Totani	
News Center Staffer	Yosuke Akimoto	

== Reception ==
Chris Beveridge of Mania gave the OVA a mixed review stating "The plot, though simplistic, does work fairly well as a sidestory for the manga." Paul Jacques also from Mania, also gave it a similar review when comparing it to the 2004 film stating, "This original release has slightly better script dialogue (less one liners) than the 2004 version, but lacks the back-story to make you care about anyone. This original version never engaged me emotionally as the 2004 version did: Whereas the 2004 version pulled me in with pathos, this original repels me with judicious swearing and "out of left field" plot twists."

Stig Høgset of THEM Anime Reviews heavily criticized the OVA for the changes made from the plot of the manga stating, "It's like they took the deep stories of the manga and tossed them out the window, replacing them with your typical action fare." Michael Poirier of EX Media, also gave it a negative review stating, "its limited length, crude animation techniques and easy-listening musical score, this animated version of APPLESEED sputters from start to finish." Paul Thomas Chapman of Otaku USA criticized the plot and animation, stating "The animation is laughably limited in places" and "The story isn't particularly engaging." Helen McCarthy in 500 Essential Anime Movies stated that although the anime "is showing its age, it's still worth the shelf space." She criticized the English translation, however, and noted that "many of the Greek names are rendered into gibberish rather than English".
