= The Prometheus Institute =

US non-profit organization

The Prometheus Institute is a US 501(c)(3) non-profit public policy organization founded in 2003, "dedicated to discovering independent policy solutions to pressing national issues, and creatively marketing these ideas to the people of the United States, especially the younger generations." Projects have included:

- DIY Democracy, a free application for the iPhone, iPod Touch, and iPad, which "allows users to communicate directly with leaders at local, state and federal levels of government" instantly and conveniently.
- People for the American Dream, a project designed to inspire young entrepreneurs
- StateHouseCall.org, a blog devoted to decentralized health care solutions
