= USS Prometheus (1814) =

United States Navy brig

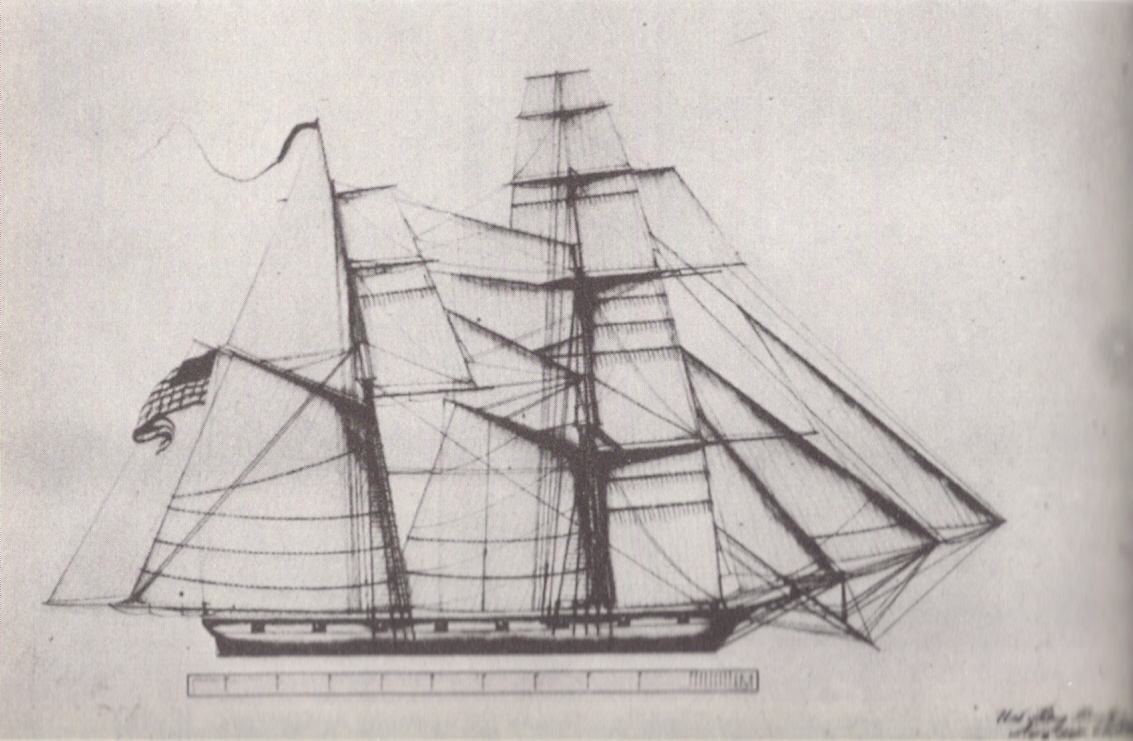
- Sail plan of USS Prometheus

History

United States
- Name: USS Prometheus
- Builder: William Seguin, Philadelphia
- Acquired: by purchase, 1814
- Decommissioned: October 1818
- Fate: Sold, 1819

General characteristics
- Type: Brig
- Displacement: 290 long tons (295 t)
- Length: 99 ft 9 in (30.40 m) (b.p) 82 ft (25 m) keel
- Beam: 27 ft 6 in (8.38 m)
- Draft: 11 ft 4 in (3.45 m)
- Propulsion: Sail
- Complement: 50-60
- Armament: in 1814; 2 × 32-pounder gun; 6 × 32-pounder carronades; 4 × 9-pounder guns; in 1816; 1 × 32-pounder gun; 4 × 18-pounder carronades; 4 × 9-pounder guns; in 1818; 1 × 18-pounder gun; 4 × 18-pounder carronades; 6 × 9-pounder guns

The first USS Prometheus was a brig in the United States Navy from 1814 to 1818.

Prometheus was built by William Seguin, Philadelphia, Pennsylvania; purchased in 1814 by the Navy from Messrs. Savage and Dryan, the original owners, as the brig Escape; commissioned and renamed Prometheus, she was fitted out at Philadelphia by Master Commandant Joseph J. Nicholson.

In March–May 1815 she made a cruise to the West Indies to carry U.S. Senators Eligius Fromentin and James Brown to Havana. She sailed for Europe on 14 August 1816 to take Edward Coles, special messenger from the President of the United States to the Emperor Alexander I of Russia, returning to Boston, Massachusetts, on 25 November. In 1817 she was employed in surveying the U.S. coast north of Newport, Rhode Island, and in 1818 she operated along the southern coast and at New Orleans, Louisiana.

In October 1818 she was pronounced unseaworthy and decommissioned. Prometheus was dismantled and sold at auction at New Orleans in 1819.
