= Appleseed Ex Machina =

2007 Japanese computer-generated animation film

Appleseed: Ex Machina
- Japanese promotional poster
- Kana: エクスマキナ
- Revised Hepburn: Ekusu Makina
- Directed by: Shinji Aramaki
- Written by: Kiyoto Takeuchi; Todd W. Russell
- Based on: Appleseed by Masamune Shirow
- Produced by: John Woo; Joseph Chou; Terence Chang
- Starring: Ai Kobayashi; Kōichi Yamadera; Gara Takashima; Yūji Kishi; Miyuki Sawashiro
- Edited by: Ryūji Miyajima
- Music by: Haruomi Hosono; Tetsuya Takahashi
- Production companies: Micott & Basara; Digital Frontier
- Distributed by: Toei Company
- Release date: October 20, 2007 (Japan)
- Running time: 101 minutes
- Country: Japan
- Language: Japanese
- Budget: $10 million

Appleseed: Ex Machina, also known as E.X. Machina (Japanese: エクスマキナ, Hepburn: Ekusu Makina) in the original version, is a 2007 Japanese animated CG science fiction film and is the sequel to the 2004 Appleseed film, similarly directed by Shinji Aramaki, and was produced by Hong Kong director and producer John Woo. It was released on October 20, 2007, in Japan and in the United States on March 11, 2008, as a direct-to-video sequel.

== Plot ==
Two years after the incident at the utopian city Olympus, Deunan Knute and Briareos Hecatonchires of the counter-terrorism unit E-SWAT rescue a group of European Union officials from cyborgs. The duo returns to Olympus, where Briareos is confined to hospital until he recovers. Deunan continues E-SWAT work, meeting her new partner, Tereus, who surprisingly resembles Briareos' human form. Deunan demands an explanation and is given the tour of the new Bioroid production facility. During the tour, Hitomi, a bioroid that Deunan has befriended, is mentioned to now be a minister of political affairs. Tereus is actually a Bioroid; a prototype for a whole new production line of Bioroids to be soldiers without negative emotions to impact their judgment in fighting. As his physical and mental strength was found to be most desirable in E-SWAT, Briareos' DNA was used mostly in Tereus' design. Reluctantly, Deunan is partnered up with Tereus to evaluate his performance. Deunan notices that many Olympus citizens are wearing Connexus; a device on their ears which projects holographic data over the eyes.

Deunan, Lance and Hitomi visit Briareos, still recovering in hospital. Here, Lance states that out of the last five terrorist incidents, four of them have been by groups composed solely of cyborgs, with transmitted signals from surrounding locations, thus suggesting that digitally vulnerable cyborgs are actually being manipulated to perform these acts. Because many of these cyborgs consist of parts made by Poseidon, a multinational industrial conglomerate, an emissary is sent to Prime Minister Athena. The emissary denies Poseidon blame, but Olympus still boycotts them, which Poseidon finds undesirable as other world powers may follow suit.

Meanwhile, Hitomi hosts a birthday party, in which Deunan is happy to find Briareos attending now that he's fully recovered. Briareos meets Tereus for the first time — which makes him uncomfortable — but the two accept each other. Briareos also accepts Deunan's new partnership with Tereus and has found another partner, which upsets Deunan. She storms off, but is eventually joined by Tereus, who displays many of Briareos' personality traits, which causes further confusion for Deunan.

The next day, Athena and an assemblage of world leaders discuss making a global security network by merging all the satellites worldwide to prevent terrorist attacks. ESWAT and the Olympus police forces set up barricades around the conference hall. ESWAT personnel detect the broadcast of an unknown signal. Soon, a variety of vehicles and non-cybernetic humans begin to assault the conference, much to the confusion of ESWAT and the regular police. Even more strangely, at the same time, Aeacus kills an engineer on board an ESWAT transport, declaring, "We will all be one. I am Halcon" and destroys it to escape wearing his Land-Mate. Briareos rushes to the explosion, and initially tries to stop Aeacus but ends up killing him. As Deunan and Tereus arrive, Tereus uncovers the mysterious signal coming from robotic doves. Simultaneously, the unknown signal disappears, and the attackers collapse. A funeral is held sometime later for Aeacus.

At the same time all the satellites are joined, Briareos is nearly run down by an unmanned vehicle. He stops it but suddenly goes berserk and hacks into a public terminal, crashing the main satellite control, forcing Olympus to switch to a backup. Briareos is hospitalized, with the unknown signal ruled out as the cause of his outburst. Briareos gets suspicious of his cyborg doctor, Richard Kestner, who operated on him after his accident. He has Hitomi look up Kestner's files, learning that he once worked with Poseidon's Halcon Laboratories — but all records of his project are mysteriously erased. Briaereos escapes and locates Kestner, who confesses that he is part of a plan to "unify" humanity by erasing individuality, to which he attributes the source of human conflict. He reveals that he secretly injected Briareos with nanites designed to take control of his body when his adrenaline is heated. Kestner commits suicide before the police arrive, making them think that Briareos killed him. Briareos escapes, but is cornered by Tereus. Deunan arrives with an antidote designed to suppress the nanites.

The virus Kestner placed in the backup network takes control of the satellites and, through these satellites, all people linked to the Connexus, compelling them to riot against Olympus. Believing that Poseidon knows something about all this, Briareos, Tereus and Deunan track down a Poseidon convoy to learn about Halcon. As they discover, Halcon was once the leading scientific laboratory until they started mind control experiments. Poseidon stopped the project by killing lead researcher Elizabeth Xander in an "accident". Poseidon assists the ESWAT officers in infiltrating the fortress where the Halcon signal is transmitting. Once they are in the control center, they discover that Xander was resurrected as a cyborg to control all those linked to the Connexus. Deunan manages to briefly free her from Halcon control with the last syringe of antidote. With little time before the virus retakes control, Xander frees the enthralled before she has Deunan kill her. The heroes then escape the collapsing fortress and return to Olympus.

== Cast ==
The English version dub was produced at Amusement Park Media in Houston, Texas. The cast were made up of actors from ADV Films.

Role	Japanese voice actor	English dubbing actor
Deunan Knute	Ai Kobayashi	Luci Christian
Briareos Hecatonchires	Kōichi Yamadera	David Matranga
Tereus	Yūji Kishi	Illich Guardiola
Athena	Gara Takashima	Allison L. Sumrall
Nike	Rei Igarashi	Shelley Calene-Black
Hitomi	Miyuki Sawashiro	Hilary Haag
Commander Lance	Shinpachi Tsuji	Chris Hutchison
Manuel Aeacus	Kong Kuwata	Mike MacRae
Dr. Riharuto Kestner	Takaya Hashi	John Gremillion
Yoshino	Rika Fukami	Melissa Davis
Arges	Takaya Kuroda	Quentin Haag
Dr. Xander	Naoko Kouda	Alice Fulks
Yoshitsune	Yasuyuki Kase	Chris Patton

=== Motion capture actors ===
Role	Mocap actor
Deunan Knute	Toyoe Sekita
Briareos Hecatonchires	Moki Ogawa
Tereus	Yoshiyuki Kamata
Manuel Aeacus	Taisuke Nishimura
Commander Lance	Michihiko Kuwagaki
Athena	Miyoko Hanai
Nike	Hideka Suzuki
Yoshino	Junko Hiratsuka
Dr. Riharuto Kestner	Inaho Miyazaki
Hitomi	Naoko Ito
Yoshitsune	PEPE
Aeacus' son	Tomoki Mure

== Production ==
The film was produced by Hidenori Ueki, Joseph Chou, Naoko Watanabe, John Woo and Terence Chang. Woo and Chang became involved after they were invited to a screening of the original film. While Woo was unfamiliar with anime, he liked Appleseed's designs and story enough to become interested in working with Aramaki.

=== Costume design ===
Deunan in one of her Prada-designed costumes

Two of Deunan's costumes in the film were designed by Italian fashion designer Miuccia Prada. Prada was apparently already a fan of the first Appleseed movie, and she jumped at the chance to work on the second installment. At a press conference for the film, she said:

Watching the previous 'Appleseed,' I thought that the expression of contrast in man and machine, violence and love was wonderful.

— Miuccia Prada

=== Marketing ===
Warner Home Video created a trailer remix contest in December 2007 to promote the release of the film. The contest's aim was to have fans remix the Appleseed: Ex Machina trailer into new short videos, using clips from the film and songs from the soundtrack. Fans could put these assets together into new short videos within an editing program on the contest site. Visitors to the site then voted on their favorite video, with the creator of the winning video winning a trip to WonderCon 2008. The contest ended February 7, 2008.

Appleseed: Ex Machina was released on DVD on "Single Disc" and "Two-Disc Collector's Edition" on March 11, 2008.

Following the release of the film, Hot Toys released 1/6 scale poseable action figures of Deunan Knute and Briareos Hecatonchires.

== Reception ==
Appleseed Ex Machina received a mostly positive response.

Mark Schilling of The Japan Times stated that "the film was a "dramatic improvement" over the 2004 Appleseed film. Schilling compared the characters to that of Vexille, noting that the characters in Ex Machina have a "wider emotional range, expressing everything from matey humor to expressions of embarrassment and gestures of love that are surprisingly natural, even moving". Commenting on the action scenes, Schilling found that Aramaki and Woo and their team "try to make Ex Machina the latest word in sci-fi anime, they are firmly wedded to standard action tropes, such as characters who spray foes with terrific blasts of automatic firepower, like Leslie Cheung and Chow Yun-fat in Woo's 1980s Hong Kong action pics."
