= Appleseed Alpha =

2014 film by Shinji Aramaki

- Blu-ray Disc cover
- Directed by: Shinji Aramaki
- Written by: Marianne Krawczyk
- Based on: Appleseed by Masamune Shirow
- Produced by: Joseph Chou; Eiichi Kamagata
- Music by: Tetsuya Takahashi
- Production companies: Lucent Pictures; Sola Digital Arts
- Distributed by: Stage 6 Films (United States); Aniplex (Japan)
- Release dates: July 15, 2014 (United States); January 17, 2015 (Japan)
- Running time: 93 minutes
- Countries: Japan; United States
- Language: English

Appleseed Alpha (also styled as Appleseed α) is an animated military science fiction cyberpunk film. The English version's voice cast includes Luci Christian (Deunan Knute), David Matranga (Briareos) and Wendel Calvert (Two Horns). This film does not follow the previous Appleseed film canon; it is an alternate version of the story's origins. Briareos, for example, is already a cyborg and did not become separated from Deunan to be later reunited in Olympus to join ESWAT. A two-volume prequel manga by Iou Kuroda was published in Morning Two in 2014.

It was announced on February 11, 2014, that Sony Pictures Worldwide and Lucent Pictures Entertainment would be making a new CG-animated film. Appleseed Alpha had an advance digital release on July 15, 2014.

== Plot ==
In the 22nd century, after a devastating world war, veterans Deunan Knute and Briareos are living in the ruins of New York doing jobs for a cyborg despot named Two Horns, with Deunan hoping that once they've paid off their debt to him for fixing Briareos' war injuries, they can go find the legendary utopic city of Olympus, though Briareos is more pessimistic. However, whenever they are close to finishing a job, they are sabotaged.

One day, while eliminating rogue combat drones, Deunan and Briareos meet Olson, a cybernetics-equipped soldier, and a young girl named Iris. Though initially reserved with each other, Olson discovers that Two Horns' mechanic Mattews has been deliberately crippling Briareos' systems to keep him and Deunan under Two Horns' thumb. Soon after, two cyborgs named Talos and Nyx, who are trailing Olson and Iris, appear, forcing Deunan and Briareos to depart with their new friends. After questioning Two Horns, and then attempting to kill him, Talos puts Deunan and Briareos on his target list as well. After recovering, Two Horns follows them to capture Iris and use her as a bargaining chip against Talos.

As they travel together, Iris and Olson gradually reveal that they are from Olympus, on a mission to dispose of leftover weapons from the war. Talos is also an agent from Olympus who has developed a messiah complex and wants to use Iris to take control of these weapons. When Two Horns finds and attacks them, Iris and Olson are captured by Talos. After brutally extracting the location of a prototype superweapon from Olson's memories, Talos murders him and takes Iris with him. Briareos and Deunan find Olson's body, recover the information they need, and follow Talos and Iris to the weapon's location.

In a secret underground bunker, Talos activates the superweapon - a giant, heavily armed mobile fortress - using Iris' retinal pattern. Deunan and Briareos fight their way into the complex, supported by Two Horns, who is now out for revenge against Talos, and Mattews, who presents Deunan with a power armor suit. Briareos duels and kills Nyx, but Deunan is too late to save Iris; the fortress makes its way to the surface, but instead of following Talos' commands, it is hardwired on a suicide bombing mission against New York. With Two Horns and Briareos' help, Deunan boards the superwalker and kills Talos, but in order to destroy the weapon, Briareos must snipe its power core. To prevent countermeasures, Iris remains on board and evicts Deunan from the fortress after revealing that she is a bioroid specifically created for this mission. Briareos takes the shot, destroying both the fortress and Iris inside it.

After regrouping, Deunan and Briareos depart for Olympus, with Two Horns absolving them of their debts and Mattews gifting them the restored exosuit. Unknown to them, they have been closely observed by Olympus Officer Hitomi, Iris' human template. When asked whether Deunan and Briareos should be brought to Olympus for their help, Hitomi explains instead: "They're like apple seeds. Wherever they go, hope will sprout. Others who are worthy are sure to follow."

== Voice cast ==
Character	English voice actor	Japanese voice actor
Deunan	Luci Christian	Yuka Komatsu
Briareos	David Matranga	Junichi Suwabe
Two Horns	Wendel Calvert	Tessho Genda
Mattews	Chris Hutchison	Katsunosuke Hori
Olson	Adam Gibbs	Hiroki Takahashi
Iris/Hitomi	Brina Palencia	Aoi Yūki
Talos	Josh Sheltz	Hiroki Touchi
Nyx	Elizabeth Bunch	Kaori Nazuka

== Reception ==
Zac Bertschy from Anime News Network called it "the most visually stunning Appleseed movie yet". Hollywood Outbreak website wrote that "thanks to the extensive motion and facial capture work on the project, the animation is a perfect balance of realism and science fiction-esque fantasy". Appleseed Alpha was selected for screening at Fantasia Festival on July 19, 2014.

== Awards and nominations ==
Year	Award	Nominated work	Result
2015	Behind the Voice Actors (BTVA) Voice Acting Award for Best Female Lead Vocal Performance in an Anime Feature Film/Special	Luci Christian	Nominated
2015	Behind the Voice Actors (BTVA) Voice Acting Award for Best Male Vocal Performance in an Anime Feature Film/Special in a Supporting Role	Wendel Calvert	Nominated
