= Erika Ishitobi =

Japanese actress and singer

- 石飛 恵里花
- Born: 9 May 1997 (age 29)
- Occupations: Actress; singer
- Years active: 2016–present
- Employer: Holy Peak
- Notable work: The Honor Student at Magic High School as Saho Mizuo; Idol Bu Show as Misao Kiyomi; Blue Archive as Haruka Igusa
- Musical career
- Formerly of: Purely Monster

Erika Ishitobi (Japanese: 石飛 恵里花, Hepburn: Ishitobi Erika; born 9 May 1997) is a Japanese actress and singer from Saitama Prefecture, affiliated with Holy Peak. A former member of the voice acting idol unit Purely Monster, she is known for voicing Saho Mizuo in The Honor Student at Magic High School, Misao Kiyomi in Idol Bu Show, and Haruka Igusa in Blue Archive.

== Biography ==
Erika Ishitobi, a native of Saitama Prefecture, was born on 9 May 1997. During her youth, she ran a website for yume shōsetsu and was an absentee in junior high school. In December 2012, she was selected as a finalist in the 4th Popteen Model Audition and won the Pop Model Award. She made her debut as a reader model for the magazine. She left Popteen while she graduated high school.

On 2 June 2016, she announced that she had joined Holy Peak as a voice actress. In May 2017, she became an inaugural member of the voice actress idol unit Purely Monster, a joint venture between Holy Peak and Amuse Inc. In August 2017, she became a shinjin joshi manager for the official Monster Hunter fan site Monhan-bu. In 2019, it was announced that she would voice Misao Kiyomi in the Idol Bu Show franchise.

On 17 May 2021, she announced her graduation from Purely Monster; she graduated on 3 November 2021. In June 2021, she was cast as Saho Mizuo in The Honor Student at Magic High School. She stars as Haruka Igusa in Blue Archive, reprising her role in the 2024 anime adaptation.

She has also worked as a stage actress and radio personality, having appeared in Tobe! Ishitobi.

Ishitobi has a pet cat named Ten-san (てんさん).

== Filmography ==
=== Television animation ===
Year	Title	Role	Ref.
2017	A Centaur's Life		
2018	Tada Never Falls in Love	Maid	
2021	Assault Lily Fruits	Renka Iijima	
2021	Hortensia Saga	Alfred (young)	
2021	The Honor Student at Magic High School	Saho Mizuo	
2024	Blue Archive The Animation	Haruka Igusa	

=== Animated film ===
Year	Title	Role	Ref.
2021	Sword Art Online Progressive: Aria of a Starless Night		
2022	Idol Bu Show	Misao Kiyomi	

=== Video games ===
Year	Title	Role	Ref.
2016	Chain Chronicle 3	Carlin	
2017	Onsen Musume	Miya Harazuru	
2017	Destiny Child	Isis	
2017	Spirit Hunter: Death Mark	Madoka Hiroo	
2018	Hortensia Saga	Protagonist (young)	
2018	Magatsu Wahrheit	Fanny	
2018	Metal Max Xeno	Tony	
2018	Spirit Hunter: NG	Manami Onijima, Kakuya	
2019	Quiz RPG: The World of Mystic Wiz	Enigma Black Lily	
2020	Baton Relay	Fuyuka Kabasaka	
2021	Assault Lily: Last Bullet	Koika Iijima	
2021	Blue Archive	Haruka Igusa	
2021	Famicom Detective Club: The Girl Who Stands Behind	Akane Yamazaki	
2022	Spirit Hunter: Death Mark II	Madoka Hiroo, others	

=== Stage productions ===
Year	Title	Role	Ref.
2020	Assault Lily The Fateful Gift	Renka Iijima	
2023	Arisugawa Gakuin Bunkamatsuri Live Stage	Student council president	
