= Maki Hanatani =

Japanese singer and voice actress

- 花谷 麻妃
- Born: 16 March 2002 (age 24)
- Occupations: Singer; voice actress
- Employer: Style Cube
- Notable work: The Idolmaster Cinderella Girls as Kozue Yusa; Idol Bu Show as Sakura Saruno
- Musical career
- Formerly of: Fullfull Pocket

Maki Hanatani (花谷 麻妃, Hanatani Maki; born 16 March 2002) is a Japanese singer and voice actress from Hyōgo Prefecture, affiliated with Style Cube. A member of the Japanese idol group Fullfull Pocket until 2017, she made her solo debut with "Datte, Gyutte Shite", the opening theme song of the 2016 anime Kuma Miko: Girl Meets Bear. As a voice actor, she is known for portraying Kozue Yusa in The Idolmaster Cinderella Girls and Sakura Saruno in Idol Bu Show.

== Biography ==
Maki Hanatani, a native of Hyōgo Prefecture, was born on 16 March 2002. She began her entertainment career at the age of three, initially appearing in commercials. Influenced by her father, she became interested in Shōwa era music. A member of the Japanese idol group Fullfull Pocket, she started her idol group activities while in the 6th grade of elementary school.

On 27 April 2016, she released her solo debut single "Datte, Gyutte Shite", the opening theme song of the anime Kuma Miko: Girl Meets Bear. On 18 March 2017, she left Fullfull Pocket to concentrate on her voice acting career.

She voices Kozue Yusa in The Idolmaster Cinderella Girls, a sub-franchise in The Idolmaster franchise. She has performed as a singer on several Idolmaster music releases, including the 2020 single "The Idolmaster Cinderella Girls Little Stars Extra! Sing the Prologue" (which charted at #9 in the Oricon Singles Chart) and the 2020 single "The Idolmaster Cinderella Girls Starlight Master Gold Rush! 2: Taiyou no Enogubako" (which charted at #10 in the Oricon Singles Chart). She also voices Sakura Saruno in the Idol Bu Show franchise.

On 10 July 2021, she left Space Craft, her agency for sixteen years since the beginning of her career, and began working as a freelancer.

Her favorite songs are the Rolling Stones's "Paint It Black" and Machiko Watanabe's "Kamome ga Tonda Hi", and among her favorite musicians are Goose House, Sting, Junko Yagami, and Kenshi Yonezu. Her hobbies include desktop music and building PCs.

== Filmography ==
=== Animated television ===
- Kuma Miko: Girl Meets Bear, Aki Andō (2016)
- Idolish7, female customer (2023)

=== Original net animation ===
- The Idolmaster Cinderella Girls Theater: Extra Stage, Kozue Yusa (2020)

=== Animated film ===
- Idol Bu Show, Sakura Saruno (2022)

=== Video games ===
- The Idolmaster Cinderella Girls, Kozue Yusa (2019)
- Vivid Army, Martel (2020)
- London Meikyūtan, Kotetsu (2021)
- Kemono Friends 3, Serval (2023)

=== Live-action television ===
- Oha Suta 645, Mushi Kids
- Wataru Seken wa Oni Bakari, friend

== Discography ==
Title	Year	Single details	Peak chart positions		Sales
Title	Year	Single details	JPN	JPN Hot	Sales
"Datte, Kyutte shite"	2016	Released: 27 April 2016; Label: Kadokawa Media Factory	67	—	—
"—" denotes releases that did not chart or were not released in that region.
