= The Dance for Philosophy =

Japanese girl group

The Dance for Philosophy フィロソフィーのダンス
- Genre: J-pop
- Years active: 2015–2026
- Label: Sony Music Records
- Members: Haru Hinata; Mariri Okutsu; Maria Sato; Nono Kiyoshi; Nanako Kayama
- Past members: Nanako Ichikawa; Otoha Totsuka

The Dance for Philosophy (フィロソフィーのダンス, Philosophy no Dance) was a Japanese idol group. Abbreviated as Filonosu (Japanese: フィロのス), the girl group was formed in 2015. It disbanded with a final concert on June 13, 2026.

== History ==
=== 2015–2019: Formation and debut ===
Philosophy no Dance, consisting of members Halu Hinata, Mariri Okutsu, Maria Sato, Nanako Ichikawa, and Otoha Totsuka, was formed in July 2015. Nanako Ichikawa left the group on October 7. They released their debut single "Suki Kirai Antinomy" on December 20.

Their second single, "All We Need Is Love Story", was released on May 15, 2016, followed by their third single, "I'm After Time", on October 22. They held their first concert on November 20 of that same year. Their debut album Funky but Chic was released on November 23.

They released their fourth single "Like a Zombie" on March 19, 2017, followed by their fifth single "Just Memories" on July 15, and their sixth single "Anne to Otohasu" on September 15. Their second album, The Founder, was released on November 22.

On August 31, 2018, they released the double A-side single "It's My Turn / Live Life". A second double A-side single, "Love Variation with Scoobie Do / Heuristic City", was released on December 14. Their third album Excelsior was released on April 5, 2019.

=== 2020–2026: Major label debut and line-up changes ===
They released a remix album titled Sapiosexual on March 6, 2020. The made their major label debut with the single "Don't Stop the Dance" through Sony Music Records on September 23.

Their second major single "Cup Ramen Program" was released on April 28, 2021, followed by their third; "Double Standard", which was the ending theme song of The Honor Student at Magic High School, on August 18, and their fourth; "Sunflower" on December 1.

On April 27, 2022, they released their fourth album Ai no Tetsugaku. They released their first EP, Red Carnival, on October 19. On November 19, Otoha Totsuka graduated from the group and two new members: Nono Kiyoshi and Nanako Kayama joined.

Their fifth major single, "Neppū wa Ruten Suru", which was the opening theme song of Ayakashi Triangle, was released on March 15, 2023. Their sixth major single, "Chou Cream Funk", which was the ending theme song of Mashle, was released on May 31. Their second EP, One Summer Dream, was released on September 20.

Their fifth album New Berry was released on March 13, 2024. They released their seventh major single "Liar Girl" on July 31, followed by their eighth major single "Koi no Shabadubidu" on November 13.

On January 13, 2026, the group announced their final tour, with their last show at the Line Cube Shibuya on June 13.

== Members ==
=== Final ===
- Halu Hinata (日向ハル)
- Mariri Okutsu (奥津マリリ)
- Maria Sato (佐藤まりあ)
- Nono Kiyoshi (木葭のの)
- Nanako Kayama (香山ななこ)

=== Former ===
- Nanako Ichikawa (市川菜々子)
- Otoha Totsuka (十束おとは)

== Discography ==
=== Studio albums ===
Title	Album details	Peak chart positions	
Title	Album details	Oricon	Billboard
Funky but Chic	Released: November 23, 2016; Label: Philosophy of the World; Formats: CD, digital download	—	—
The Founder	Released: November 22, 2017; Label: Philosophy of the World; Formats: CD, digital download	38	61
Excelsior (エクセルシオール)	Released: April 5, 2019; Label: Philosophy of the World; Formats: CD, digital download	18	63
Ai no Tetsugaku (愛の哲学)	Released: April 27, 2022; Label: Sony Music Records; Formats: CD, digital download	8	8
New Berry	Released: March 13, 2024; Label: Sony Music Records; Formats: CD, digital download	11	12

=== Compilation albums ===
Title	Album details	Peak chart positions	
Title	Album details	Oricon	Billboard
Dance Founder (Re Vocal Version) (ダンス・ファウンダー (リ・ボーカル・バージョン))	Released: February 7, 2017; Label: Philosophy of the World; Formats: CD, digital download	33	58

=== Remix albums ===
Title	Album details
Sapiosexual	Released: March 6, 2020; Label: Philosophy of the World; Formats: CD, digital download

=== Extended plays ===
Title	Album details	Peak chart positions	
Title	Album details	Oricon	Billboard
Red Carnival	Released: October 19, 2022; Label: Sony Music Records; Formats: CD, digital download	8	8
One Summer Dream	Released: September 20, 2023; Label: Sony Music Records; Formats: CD, digital download	11	10

=== Singles ===
Title	Year	Peak chart positions		Album
Title	Year	Oricon	Billboard	Album
"Suki Kirai Antinomy" (すききらいアンチノミー)	2015	—	—	Funky but Chic
"All We Need Is Love Story" (オール・ウィー・ニード・イズ・ラブストーリー)	2016	—	—	Funky but Chic
"I'm After Time" (アイム・アフター・タイム)	2016	—	—	Funky but Chic
"Like a Zombie" (ライク・ア・ゾンビ)	2017	—	—	The Founder
"Just Memories" (ジャスト・メモリーズ)	2017	—	—	The Founder
"Anne to Otohasu" (アンヌトオトハス)	2017	—	—	Non-album single
"It's My Turn" (イッツ・マイ・ターン)	2018	7	58	Excelsior
"Live Life" (ライブ・ライフ)	2018	7	—	Excelsior
"Love Variation with Scoobie Do" (ラブ・バリエーション with SCOOBIE DO)	2018	—	—	Excelsior
"Heuristic City" (ヒューリスティック・シティ)	2018	—	—	Excelsior
"Don't Stop the Dance" (ドント・ストップ・ザ・ダンス)	2020	2	61	Ai no Tetsugaku
"Cup Ramen Program" (カップラーメン・プログラム)	2021	14	—	Ai no Tetsugaku
"Double Standard" (ダブル・スタンダード)	2021	11	—	Ai no Tetsugaku
"Sunflower" (サンフラワー)	2021	19	—	Ai no Tetsugaku
"Neppū wa Ruten Suru" (熱風は流転する)	2023	13	—	New Berry
"Chou Cream Funk" (シュークリーム・ファンク)	2023	10	—	New Berry
"Liar Girl" (ライアーガール)	2024	10	—	Non-album singles
"Koi no Shabadubidu" (恋のシャバドゥビドゥ)	2024	19	—	Non-album singles
"Mayocchauwa" (迷っちゃうわ)	2025	11	—	Non-album singles
"Gerende Funky Love" (ゲレンデ・ファンキー・ラブ)	2025	9	—	Non-album singles
"—" denotes releases that did not chart or were not released in that region.

== Awards and nominations ==
Year	Award	Category	Recipient	Result	Ref.
2024	10th Anime Trending Awards	Ending Theme Song of the Year	"Chou Cream Funk"	Nominated	
