= List of The Irregular at Magic High School episodes =

Cover of the first volume of The Irregular at Magic High School featuring the main characters Tatsuya Shiba (foreground) and Miyuki Shiba (background).

The Irregular at Magic High School is a 2014 science fiction Japanese anime series of the light novel series of the same name written by Tsutomu Satō.

The anime is produced by Madhouse and directed by Manabu Ono, along with original character designs by Kana Ishida and soundtrack music by Taku Iwasaki. The series ran on Tokyo MX, GTV, and GYT in Japan from April 6 to September 28, 2014, with later airings on MBS, CTC, tvk, TV Saitama, TV Aichi, TVQ, TVh, AT-X, BS11. The anime has been licensed for streaming by Aniplex of America.

At the "Dengeki Bunko Aki no Namahōsō Festival" event on October 6, 2019, a second season of the anime series was announced and originally scheduled to air in July 2020, which will adapt the "Visitor Arc" in the novel series, but it aired from October 4 to December 27, 2020, due to the COVID-19 pandemic. The main staff and cast from the 2017 film are reprising their roles in the second season.

After the end of the series, it was revealed that the spin-off manga series, The Honor Student at Magic High School would get an anime television series adaptation in 2021.

On February 28, 2021, an anime adaptation of the "Reminiscence Arc" has been announced. It was later revealed to be a 60-minute episode, with the main cast and staff of the second season reprising their roles. It aired on December 31, 2021.

On January 1, 2022, a sequel anime was announced. In July 2023, the sequel was confirmed to be a new television series directed by Jimmy Stone at Eight Bit. The season aired from April 5 to June 28, 2024.

== Series overview ==
Season	Episodes	Originally released	
Season	Episodes	First released	Last released
1	26	April 6, 2014	September 28, 2014
2	13	October 4, 2020	December 27, 2020
Special		December 31, 2021	
3	13	April 5, 2024	June 28, 2024

== Episodes ==
=== Season 1 (2014) ===
No. overall	No. in season	Title	Directed by	Written by	Storyboarded by	Original release date	Ref.
1	1	"Enrollment Part I"; Transliteration: "Nyūgaku-hen I" (Japanese: 入学編I)	Masaki Matsumura	Yukie Sugawara	Manabu Ono	April 6, 2014	
2	2	"Enrollment Part II"; Transliteration: "Nyūgaku-hen II" (Japanese: 入学編II)	Sadanori Kaneda	Yukito Kizawa	Koji Iwai	April 13, 2014	
3	3	"Enrollment Part III"; Transliteration: "Nyūgaku-hen III" (Japanese: 入学編III)	Tamaki Nakatsu	Muneo Nakamoto	Yuuji Kumazawa	April 20, 2014	
4	4	"Enrollment Part IV"; Transliteration: "Nyūgaku-hen IV" (Japanese: 入学編IV)	Shūji Miyazaki	Yukie Sugawara	Shuuji Miyazaki	April 27, 2014	
5	5	"Enrollment Part V"; Transliteration: "Nyūgaku-hen V" (Japanese: 入学編V)	Eiichi Kuboyama	Yukito Kizawa	Kenichi Kawamura	May 4, 2014	
6	6	"Enrollment Part VI"; Transliteration: "Nyūgaku-hen VI" (Japanese: 入学編VI)	Jun Fukuda	Yukito Kizawa	Hiroyuki Shimazu	May 11, 2014	
7	7	"Enrollment Part VII"; Transliteration: "Nyūgaku-hen VII" (Japanese: 入学編VII)	Risako Yoshida	Yukito Kizawa	Risako Yoshida	May 18, 2014	
8	8	"Nine Schools Competition Part I"; Transliteration: "Kyūkōsen-hen I" (Japanese: 九校戦編I)	Masaki Matsumura	Yukie Sugawara	Yuuji Kumazawa	May 25, 2014	
9	9	"Nine Schools Competition Part II"; Transliteration: "Kyūkōsen-hen II" (Japanese: 九校戦編II)	Sadanori Kaneda	Yukie Sugawara	Koji Iwai	June 1, 2014	
10	10	"Nine Schools Competition Part III"; Transliteration: "Kyūkōsen-hen III" (Japanese: 九校戦編III)	Tamaki Nakatsu	Yukie Sugawara	Naoyuki Itō	June 8, 2014	
11	11	"Nine Schools Competition Part IV"; Transliteration: "Kyūkōsen-hen IV" (Japanese: 九校戦編IV)	Shūji Miyazaki	Yukie Sugawara	Shuuji Miyazaki	June 15, 2014	
12	12	"Nine Schools Competition Part V"; Transliteration: "Kyūkōsen-hen V" (Japanese: 九校戦編V)	Michita Shiraishi	Muneo Nakamoto	Kenichi Kawamura	June 22, 2014	
13	13	"Nine Schools Competition Part VI"; Transliteration: "Kyūkōsen-hen VI" (Japanese: 九校戦編VI)	Ippei Yokota	Muneo Nakamoto	Hiroyuki Shimazu	June 29, 2014	
14	14	"Nine Schools Competition Part VII"; Transliteration: "Kyūkōsen-hen VII" (Japanese: 九校戦編VII)	Risako Yoshida	Muneo Nakamoto	Risako Yoshida	July 6, 2014	
15	15	"Nine Schools Competition Part VIII"; Transliteration: "Kyūkōsen-hen VIII" (Japanese: 九校戦編VIII)	Masaki Matsumura	Yukito Kizawa	Masashi Kojima	July 13, 2014	
16	16	"Nine Schools Competition Part IX"; Transliteration: "Kyūkōsen-hen IX" (Japanese: 九校戦編IX)	Tamaki Nakatsu	Yukito Kizawa	Yuuji Kumazawa	July 20, 2014	
17	17	"Nine Schools Competition Part X"; Transliteration: "Kyūkōsen-hen X" (Japanese: 九校戦編X)	Kuraya Ryōichi	Yukito Kizawa	Kenichi Kawamura	July 27, 2014	
18	18	"Nine Schools Competition Part XI"; Transliteration: "Kyūkōsen-hen XI" (Japanese: 九校戦編XI)	Shūji Miyazaki	Yukito Kizawa	Shuuji Miyazaki	August 3, 2014	
19	19	"Yokohama Disturbance Part I"; Transliteration: "Yokohama Sōran-hen I" (Japanese: 横浜騒乱編I)	Ken'ichi Kawamura	Muneo Nakamoto	Kenichi Kawamura	August 10, 2014	
20	20	"Yokohama Disturbance Part II"; Transliteration: "Yokohama Sōran-hen II" (Japanese: 横浜騒乱編II)	Ippei Yokota	Muneo Nakamoto	Hiroyuki Shimazu	August 17, 2014	
21	21	"Yokohama Disturbance Part III"; Transliteration: "Yokohama Sōran-hen III" (Japanese: 横浜騒乱編III)	Risako Yoshida	Yukie Sugawara	Risako Yoshida	August 24, 2014	
22	22	"Yokohama Disturbance Part IV"; Transliteration: "Yokohama Sōran-hen IV" (Japanese: 横浜騒乱編IV)	Kuraya Ryōichi	Yukie Sugawara	Masashi Kojima	August 31, 2014	
23	23	"Yokohama Disturbance Part V"; Transliteration: "Yokohama Sōran-hen V" (Japanese: 横浜騒乱編V)	Dai Seki	Yukie Sugawara	Hiroko Kazui	September 7, 2014	
24	24	"Yokohama Disturbance Part VI"; Transliteration: "Yokohama Sōran-hen VI" (Japanese: 横浜騒乱編VI)	Masaki Matsumura	Yukito Kizawa	Kenichi Kawamura	September 14, 2014	
25	25	"Yokohama Disturbance Part VII"; Transliteration: "Yokohama Sōran-hen VII" (Japanese: 横浜騒乱編VII)	Tamaki Nakatsu	Yukito Kizawa	Akira Hayashi	September 21, 2014	
26	26	"Yokohama Disturbance Part VIII"; Transliteration: "Yokohama Sōran-hen VIII" (Japanese: 横浜騒乱編VIII)	Ippei Yokota, Risako Yoshida	Yukito Kizawa	Manabu Ono	September 28, 2014	

=== Season 2: Visitor Arc (2020) ===
No. overall	No. in season	Title	Directed by	Storyboarded by	Original release date	Ref.
27	1	"Visitor Arc I"; Transliteration: "Raihō-sha-hen I" (Japanese: 来訪者編I)	Daisuke Eguchi	Risako Yoshida	October 4, 2020	
28	2	"Visitor Arc II"; Transliteration: "Raihō-sha-hen II" (Japanese: 来訪者編II)	Jun'ichi Takaoka	Junichi Takaoka	October 11, 2020	
29	3	"Visitor Arc III"; Transliteration: "Raihō-sha-hen III" (Japanese: 来訪者編III)	Shigetaka Ikeda	Katsumi Terahigashi	October 18, 2020	
30	4	"Visitor Arc IV"; Transliteration: "Raihō-sha-hen IV" (Japanese: 来訪者編IV)	Jimmy Stone	Jimmy Stone	October 25, 2020	
31	5	"Visitor Arc V"; Transliteration: "Raihō-sha-hen V" (Japanese: 来訪者編V)	Kunio Wakabayashi	Manabu Ono	November 1, 2020	
32	6	"Visitor Arc VI"; Transliteration: "Raihō-sha-hen VI" (Japanese: 来訪者編VI)	Daishi Katō	Risako Yoshida	November 8, 2020	
33	7	"Visitor Arc VII"; Transliteration: "Raihō-sha-hen VII" (Japanese: 来訪者編VII)	Kazuo Miyake	Satoshi Shimizu	November 15, 2020	
34	8	"Visitor Arc VIII"; Transliteration: "Raihō-sha-hen VIII" (Japanese: 来訪者編VIII)	Tatsuya Sasaki	Satoshi Shimizu	November 22, 2020	
35	9	"Visitor Arc IX"; Transliteration: "Raihō-sha-hen IX" (Japanese: 来訪者編IX)	Daishi Katō, Daisuke Eguchi	Katsumi Terahigashi	November 29, 2020	
36	10	"Visitor Arc X"; Transliteration: "Raihō-sha-hen X" (Japanese: 来訪者編X)	Jimmy Stone	Jimmy Stone	December 6, 2020	
37	11	"Visitor Arc XI"; Transliteration: "Raihō-sha-hen XI" (Japanese: 来訪者編XI)	Jimmy Stone	Katsumi Terahigashi	December 13, 2020	
38	12	"Visitor Arc XII"; Transliteration: "Raihō-sha-hen XII" (Japanese: 来訪者編XII)	Kazuo Miyake	Katsumi Terahigashi	December 20, 2020	
39	13	"Visitor Arc XIII"; Transliteration: "Raihō-sha-hen XIII" (Japanese: 来訪者編XIII)	Munenori Nawa, Kazuo Miyake	Katsumi Terahigashi	December 27, 2020	

=== Special: Reminiscence Arc (2021) ===
No.	Title	Directed by	Written by	Original release date
Special	"The Irregular at Magic High School: Reminiscence Arc"; Transliteration: "Mahōka Kōkō no Rettōsei: Tsuioku-hen" (Japanese: 魔法科高校の劣等生 追憶編)	Risako Yoshida	Muneo Nakamoto	December 31, 2021

=== Season 3 (2024) ===
No. overall	No. in season	Title	Directed by (Note: Information is taken from the ending credits of each episode.)	Storyboarded by	Original release date
40	1	"Double Seven Part I"; Transliteration: "Daburu Sebun-hen I" (Japanese: ダブルセブン編I)	Jimmy Stone	Jimmy Stone	April 5, 2024
41	2	"Double Seven Part II"; Transliteration: "Daburu Sebun-hen II" (Japanese: ダブルセブン編II)	Junichi Takaoka	Junichi Takaoka	April 12, 2024
42	3	"Double Seven Part III"; Transliteration: "Daburu Sebun-hen III" (Japanese: ダブルセブン編III)	Risako Yoshida	Risako Yoshida	April 19, 2024
43	4	"Double Seven Part IV"; Transliteration: "Daburu Sebun-hen IV" (Japanese: ダブルセブン編IV)	Jimmy Stone	Ken Ōtsuka	April 26, 2024
44	5	"Steeplechase Part I"; Transliteration: "Sutīpuruchēsu-hen I" (Japanese: スティープルチェース編I)	Akira Toba	Risako Yoshida	May 3, 2024
45	6	"Steeplechase Part II"; Transliteration: "Sutīpuruchēsu-hen II" (Japanese: スティープルチェース編II)	Ryoutarou	Katsumi Terahigashi	May 10, 2024
46	7	"Steeplechase Part III"; Transliteration: "Sutīpuruchēsu-hen III" (Japanese: スティープルチェース編III)	Tatsuya Sasaki	Katsumi Terahigashi	May 17, 2024
47	8	"Steeplechase Part IV"; Transliteration: "Sutīpuruchēsu-hen IV" (Japanese: スティープルチェース編IV)	Jimmy Stone, Munenori Nawa, Risako Yoshida, Mitsutoshi Satō	Ken Ōtsuka	May 24, 2024
48	9	"Ancient City Insurrection Part I"; Transliteration: "Koto Nairan-hen I" (Japanese: 古都内乱編I)	Yoshinobu Kasai	Masao Kojima	May 31, 2024
49	10	"Ancient City Insurrection Part II"; Transliteration: "Koto Nairan-hen II" (Japanese: 古都内乱編II)	Yinkai Cai	Masao Kojima	June 7, 2024
50	11	"Ancient City Insurrection Part III"; Transliteration: "Koto Nairan-hen III" (Japanese: 古都内乱編III)	Kentaro Mizuno	Katsumi Terahigashi	June 14, 2024
51	12	"Ancient City Insurrection Part IV"; Transliteration: "Koto Nairan-hen IV" (Japanese: 古都内乱編IV)	Unknown	TBA	June 21, 2024
52	13	"Ancient City Insurrection Part V"; Transliteration: "Koto Nairan-hen V" (Japanese: 古都内乱編V)	Risako Yoshida, Chacha Yamamoto	Jimmy Stone, Tomomi Mochizuki	June 28, 2024

== See also ==
- List of The Honor Student at Magic High School episodes
