= Kuma Miko: Girl Meets Bear =

Japanese manga and anime series

- Cover of Kuma Miko: Girl Meets Bear volume one as published by Media Factory.

くまみこ
- Genre: Comedy, slice of life
- Manga
- Written by: Masume Yoshimoto
- Published by: Media Factory
- English publisher: NA: One Peace Books
- Magazine: Monthly Comic Flapper
- Original run: April 5, 2013 – December 5, 2023
- Volumes: 20
- Anime television series
- Directed by: Kiyoshi Matsuda
- Written by: Pierre Sugiura; Masao Iketani
- Music by: Akiyuki Tateyama
- Studio: Kinema Citrus; EMT Squared
- Licensed by: AUS: Madman Entertainment; NA: Crunchyroll
- Original network: AT-X, Tokyo MX, BSN, BS11, KBS, KHB
- Original run: April 3, 2016 – June 19, 2016
- Episodes: 12 (Note: The anime's first and second home video release volumes include 6 episodes each, totaling up to 12 episodes.) + 2 OVA

Kuma Miko: Girl Meets Bear (くまみこ) is a Japanese manga series by Masume Yoshimoto, serialized in Media Factory's seinen manga magazine Monthly Comic Flapper from May 2013 to December 2023. It has been collected in twenty tankōbon volumes and is also available on Kadokawa's ComicWalker web comic service. An anime television series adaptation by Kinema Citrus and EMT Squared aired from April 3, 2016, to June 19, 2016.

== Plot ==
Machi Amayadori is the young shrine maiden who has spent her whole life in the rural mountains with Natsu, her talking guardian bear. Now, at fourteen, she wants to take a chance and attend high school in the big city.

== Characters ==
Machi Amayadori (雨宿 まち, Amayadori Machi)
Voiced by: Natsumi Hioka
The 14-year-old Miko of a mountain shrine in a remote village and is also a middle school student. She wants to move to the big city for high school because she finds life in the countryside boring, but has never left the village in her entire life, nor ever made a human friend around her age.
Natsu Kumai (クマ井 ナツ, Kumai Natsu)
Voiced by: Hiroki Yasumoto
Natsu is a talking bear who has lived with Machi since she was a child and tries his best to deal with her antics and keep her out of trouble. He opposes Machi's idea of leaving the town, fearing for her safety.
Yoshio Amayadori (雨宿 良夫, Amayadori Yoshio)
Voiced by: Kazuyuki Okitsu
Yoshio is Machi's 25 year old cousin who works as a village officer.
Etsuko Amayadori (雨宿 エツ子, Amayadori Etsuko)
Voiced by: Kazue Minami
Etsuko is Machi's aunt and Yoshio's mother.
Fuchi Amayadori (雨宿 フチ, Amayadori Fuchi)
Voiced by: Ikuko Tani
Fuchi is Etsuko's mother and Yoshio and Machi's grandmother. She lives with Machi and Natsu, but her face is never shown.
Hibiki Sakata (酒田 響, Sakata Hibiki)
Voiced by: Eri Kitamura
Hibiki is Yoshio's 24-year-old friend with a longtime crush on him, which she denies. She smokes and rides around on a motorcycle. She also displays an overly aggressive nature to hide her shyness.

== Media ==
=== Manga ===
The manga series by Masume Yoshimoto began serialization in Monthly Comic Flapper magazine on April 5, 2013. The series ended serialization on December 5, 2023. The first tankōbon volume was released on October 23, 2013. The manga has been licensed by One Peace Books for a North American release.

==== Volume list ====
No.	Original release date	Original ISBN	English release date	English ISBN
1	October 23, 2013	978-4-04-066576-4	September 20, 2016	978-1-93-554853-9
2	May 23, 2014	978-4-04-066562-7	December 20, 2016	978-1-93-554852-2
3	December 22, 2014	978-4-04-067227-4	February 14, 2017	978-1-94-493713-3
4	May 23, 2015	978-4-04-067524-4	April 18, 2017	978-1-94-493714-0
5	October 23, 2015	978-4-04-067829-0	July 18, 2017	978-1-94-493728-7
6	March 23, 2016	978-4-04-068230-3	October 24, 2017	978-1-94-493729-4
7	September 23, 2016	978-4-04-068539-7	March 13, 2018	978-1-94-493744-7
8	March 23, 2017	978-4-04-069114-5	April 17, 2018	978-1-94-493745-4
9	November 22, 2017	978-4-04-069514-3	—	—
10	June 23, 2018	978-4-04-069893-9	—	—
11	December 21, 2018	978-4-04-065349-5	—	—
12	June 22, 2019	978-4-04-065774-5	—	—
13	December 23, 2019	978-4-04-064210-9	—	—
14	June 23, 2020	978-4-04-064683-1	—	—
15	December 23, 2020	978-4-04-680051-0	—	—
16	June 23, 2021	978-4-04-680482-2	—	—
17	January 21, 2022	978-4-04-681045-8	—	—
18	September 22, 2022	978-4-04-681798-3	—	—
19	June 22, 2023	978-4-04-682522-3	—	—
20	January 23, 2024	978-4-04-683200-9	—	—

=== Anime ===
An anime television series adaptation by Kinema Citrus and EMT Squared aired from April 3, 2016 to June 19, 2016. The opening theme is "Datte, Gyutte Shite." (だって、ギュってして。; lit. 'Well, Because Hug Me.') by Maki Hanatani, and the ending theme is "Kumamiko Dancing" by Natsumi Hioka and Hiroki Yasumoto. Kadokawa, AT-X, Kinema Citrus and Sony Music Communications were involved in the production of the anime. Two OVAs are included in the first and second volume of the anime's home video release, which were released on June 24, 2016, and August 24, 2016, respectively.

==== Episode list ====
No.	Official English title (Note: All English titles are taken from Funimation.) Original Japanese title	Original release date	Ref.
1	"Time for Bear and Girl to Part"; Transliteration: "Kuma to Shōjo Owakare no Toki" (Japanese: クマと少女 お別れの時)	April 3, 2016	
Machi Amayadori is a miko who always lived on a mountain shrine with Natsu, a sacred talking bear, but she now intends to move to the big city for the high school in order to enjoy a new life, but Natsu objects, fearing for her safety. Some time later, Machi is introduced as a miko to some young children by her cousin Yoshio, but the event becomes a ruckus, much to her dismay.
2	"A Hard Road"; Transliteration: "Kewashiki Michi" (Japanese: 険しき道)	April 10, 2016	
As part of her trials to prove Natsu that she is ready to leave the town, Machi must go by herself to buy an item from a shop on a faraway location, but the errand proves itself much harder than it seems for her.
3	"The One Who Upholds Tradition"; Transliteration: "Dentō o Mamoru Mono" (Japanese: 伝統を守る者)	April 17, 2016	
Machi decides to perform a ceremonial dance by herself, an idea that pleases Natsu at first, until he realizes her true intentions. On a later occasion, a contest is held to choose some new clothes for Machi to wear, but the designs introduced are far from what she expected.
4	"Village Treasure"; Transliteration: "Mura no Takaramono" (Japanese: 村の宝物)	April 24, 2016	TBA
Machi wonders if Natsu could handle himself in her absence, but she then realizes that the opposite is less likely, and Yoshio's childhood friend Hibiki suddenly appears and takes Machi for some shopping spree.
5	"The Opposite"; Transliteration: "Urahara" (Japanese: ウラハラ)	May 1, 2016	TBA
After dealing with one of the local children's misbehavior with Natsu's help, Machi learns that Hibiki took her for shopping by Yoshio's request. Wondering why she did it, Machi ends up discovering Hibiki's most intimate secret.
6	"Village of Vanguards"; Transliteration: "Senku-sha no Mura" (Japanese: 先駆者の村)	May 8, 2016	TBA
Another of Machi's errands from Natsu turns to the worse when she causes a ruckus after a panic attack and she ends up sick in bed. Struck with guilt and worried about her, Natsu attempts to take care of Machi by himself.
7	"Kikase"; Transliteration: "Kikase" (Japanese: キカセ)	May 15, 2016	TBA
Machi attempts to use a rice cooker for a first time with disastrous results, and later, Machi, Natsu and Yoshio must prepare the shrine for an upcoming, scheduled ritual, but they were not even informed about its nature, or what they must do.
8	"On The Floor"	May 22, 2016	TBA
With the promise of briefly traveling to the big city, Machi is deceived by Yoshio into working at a nearby supermarket. However, her inability to deal with crowds put her on serious trouble, until Hibiki and Yoshio come to her aid.
9	"Commercial"; Transliteration: "Komāsharu" (Japanese: コマーシャル)	May 29, 2016	TBA
The villagers decide to shoot a commercial to promote the village's specialities in order to attract more visitors and Machi is chosen to star on it, much to her chagrin.
10	"Is That An Idol!?"; Transliteration: "Sore tte Aidoru!?" (Japanese: それってアイドル！？)	June 5, 2016	TBA
Machi gets devastated upon knowing that she is the only one at her school without a cellphone and starts begging Natsu and Yoshio for one. On a later occasion, Yoshio appears to drag Machi in another of his ideas to revitalize the village, this time by having her acting as in idol and Natsu convinces Hibiki to work with them for once.
11	"Go to the City?"; Transliteration: "Tokai e GO?" (Japanese: 都会へGO?)	June 12, 2016	TBA
Machi is chosen to participate in an idol contest at Sendai, where she finally realizes her dream of meeting the big city. However, during the contest, her fears of being shunned get the best of her again and she flees in panic.
12	"Decision"; Transliteration: "Ketsudan" (Japanese: 決断)	June 19, 2016	TBA
Machi reluctantly returns to do the contest after overhearing Yoshio saying the future of the village depends on her. She successfully completes it and wins a special award, but hallucinates that the cheering audience is throwing rocks at her. Back at home Machi, still terrified by the imagined attack, decides to abandon her dream of living in the city. Natsu hugs her and tells her she never has to think about anything difficult again. The episode ends with Machi more childish and ignorant of technology than ever before while playing with Natsu.
OVA–1	"The Day of the First Snow"; Transliteration: "Hatsuyuki no Hi" (Japanese: 初雪の日)	June 24, 2016	TBA
Winter has arrived. The villagers have to hold a farewell ceremony for Natsu because Natsu has to hibernate until the winter ends, but Machi doesn't want to be separated from Natsu.
OVA–2	"Nacchan's Shocking Debut!"; Transliteration: "Nacchan, Shōgeki Debut!" (Japanese: ナッちゃん、衝撃デビュー！)	August 24, 2016	TBA
While Machi is taking part in an idol contest at big city, Natsu is suddenly invited to participate in a mascot contest. Yoshio agrees and directs Natsu to become the mascot representing his village and wins the mascot contest.

== Reception ==
The series ranked 20th in the first Next Manga Award in the print manga category.
