= Idol Bu Show =

Japanese multimedia project

IDOL舞SHOW (Aidoru Bu Shō)
- Anime film
- Directed by: Shingo Kobayashi
- Written by: Kotsukotsu
- Music by: Shigeru Saitoh, Akihiro Tomita, and Yōhei Kisara
- Studio: ORENDA and Amineworks
- Released: 24 June 2022

Idol Bu Show (IDOL舞SHOW, Aidoru Bu Shō; lit. "Idol Dance Show") is a Japanese multimedia project centered around competing Japanese idol groups. An anime film adaptation was released in June 2022.

== Concept ==
The project is about idol groups who, after the dissolution of idol group Fool's End, compete for music and merchandise sales, concert audiences, and other things. Each group operates under the leadership of a music producer reincarnated from a general from the Sengoku period.

== Cast and characters ==
=== No Princess ===
No Princess is a "dance and vocal" idol unit whose music is produced by Shigeru Saitoh.

- Machico (2020–present) as Hikaru Fuwa (不破ひかる, Fuwa Hikaru)
- Reo Kurachi as Shiho Hoshino (星野しほ, Hoshino Shiho)
- Marina Horiuchi as Ami Akise (明瀬亜美, Akise Ami)
- Hisayo Abe as Love Kurumizaka (胡桃坂らぶ, Kurumizaka Rabu)
- Junji Majima as Shigemichi Saitō (斎藤重道, Saitō Shigemichi), the unit's music producer and a reincarnation of Saitō Dōsan, the head of the Saitō clan of Mino Province.
- Sachika Misawa (2019–2020) as Yuika Hanazono (花園ユイカ, Hanazono Yuika). She was replaced by Hikaru.

=== Lunatic Eyes ===
Lunatic Eyes (三日月眼, Runatikku Aizu) is a "high tension" idol unit whose music is produced by Akihiro Tomita.

- Ibuki Kido as Futaba Ayase (綾瀬双葉, Ayase Futaba)
- Miho Okasaki as Mirei Wakatsuki (若月美鈴, Wakatsuki Mirei)
- Yuki Nakashima as Yui Kongōji (金剛寺ゆい, Kongōji Yui)
- Shinji Kawada as Munehito Date (伊達宗人, Date Munehito), the unit's music producer and a reincarnation of Date Masamune, the daimyō of Sendai Domain.

=== X-UC ===
X-UC (X-UC, Ten'yūshi) is a "new-generation" idol unit whose music is produced by Yōhei Kisara.

- Nanaka Suwa as Risa Umino (羽美野りさ, Umino Risa)
- Maki Hanatani as Sakura Saruno (猿野さくら, Saruno Sakura)
- Moe Toyota as Koharu Hoshizuki (星月小春, Hoshizuki Koharu)
- Rena Hasegawa as Kokoro Kakegawa (掛川こころ, Kakegawa Kokoro)
- Misano Sakai as Aki Anna (安奈あき, Anna Aki)
- Anna Suzuki as Misaki Yurigaoka (百合ヶ丘みさき, Yurigaoka Misaki)
- Yuna Kitahara as Shiori Kirino (霧野しおり, Kirino Shiori)
- Sakurako Aoyama as Kawori Hachimura (八村かをり, Hachimura Kawori)
- Yui Ninomiya as Erina Isayama (伊佐山エリナ, Isayama Erina)
- Erika Ishitobi as Misao Kiyomi (清見みさ緒, Kiyomi Misao)
- Ryūnosuke Kawai as Kōnosuke Sanada (真田幸之助, Sanada Kōnosuke), the unit's music producer and a reincarnation of Sanada Yukimura, a rebel general in the Siege of Osaka.

=== It's Your Cider ===
It's Your Cider (It's your サイダー, It's your saidā) are a band of five girls. Their in-universe producers, QTarō Mōri, are a quartet of reincarnations of western Chūgoku region daimyō Mōri Motonari, while Q-MHz is their real-life music producer.

- Chihaya Yoshitake as Ichika
- Misuzu Yamada as Nina
- Haruka Yoshiki as Mina
- Wakana Ōhara as Shion
- Maki Yamamoto as Isuzu

=== Other characters ===
- Aoi Yūki and Ayana Taketatsu as Shinobu Sakuma and Nagaho Mori, the two members of Fool's End, the idol unit whose dissolution is the catalyst for the idols' competition. Their real-life music producer is Shigeru Saitoh.
- Reina Kondō as Mashiro Honma (本間ましろ, Honma Mashiro), an idol who operates solo. Her in-universe producer, Kenji Uesagi, is a reincarnation of Uesugi Kenshin, while Kо̄ichi Tsurusaki is her real-life music producer.

== Production ==
In September 2019, the project was announced, as was a 26 October concert, Senran! Idol Bu Show: Toyosu no Jin (せんらん！IDOL 舞SHOW～豊洲の陣～, Senran! Aidoru Bu Shō ~Toyosu no Jin~; lit. 'War! Idol Bu Show: Toyosu's Camp'). The screenwriter is Kanata Nakamura and the characters and key visual were designed by NOB-C. In July 2020, Yuika Hanazono was replaced by a new character, Hikaru Fuwa.

Two days before the 2022 release of the project's film, the voice actresses for Mashiro Honma and It's Your Cider were announced.

== Media ==
=== Film adaptation ===
In February 2022, it was announced that an anime film adaptation from ORENDA and Amineworks would be released that year. In March, it was announced that the film would be released on 24 June, and that part of the film would also be concert footage. The film was directed by Shingo Kobayashi, written by Kotsukotsu, produced by Ryō Aizawa, and supervised by Tetsuya Sano. The three primary idol units' music producers produced the music.

=== Discography ===
Title	Year	Album details	Peak chart positions		Sales
Title	Year	Album details	JPN	JPN Hot	Sales
Truth or Dare (by No Princess)	2020	Released: 8 January 2020; Label: Universal Music Artists	33	—	—
Fanatic! (by Lunatic Eyes)	2020	Released: 8 January 2020; Label: Universal Music Artists	39	—	—
Current Xanadu (by X-UC)	2020	Released: 8 January 2020; Label: Universal Music Artists	28	—	—
"—" denotes releases that did not chart or were not released in that region.
