= Haruka Yoshiki =

Japanese singer and voice actress

- 吉木 悠佳
- Born: 1 July 1998 (age 28)
- Occupations: Singer; voice actress
- Years active: 2012–present
- Agent: Crocodile
- Notable work: Idol Bu Show as Mina; Kizuna no Allele as Ellie
- Musical career
- Genres: J-Pop; anison
- Instrument: Vocals
- Years active: 2012–present
- Label: Rocket Beats
- Formerly of: Party Rockets GT

Haruka Yoshiki (吉木 悠佳, Yoshiki Haruka; born 1 July 1998) is a Japanese singer and voice actress affiliated with Crocodile. She was the leader of the local idol group Party Rockets GT, and she later started solo singing and voice acting careers, starring as Mina in Idol Bu Show and as Ellie in Kizuna no Allele.

== Biography ==
Haruka Yoshiki, a native of Sendai, was born on 1 July 1998. She was originally a member of B Sharp before she was tapped to join the local idol group Party Rockets GT in 2012. She was also the group's leader, under the stage name Haruka (stylized in all-caps). She had originally planned to be a voice actress, but decided to focus on Party Rockets GT instead of continuing her education beyond high school or her voice acting lessons.

As the only Party Rockets GT member who did not reserve time for school, she was the busiest member and decided to start a solo career after receiving staff encouragement to do so. On 21 April 2017, a music video for her solo debut song "Daybreak" was released. On 29 April 2017, her solo debut performance "Yoshiki Now" was held at Club Crawl in Shibuya. On 1 July 2017 (her 19th birthday), her solo debut concert Grown Up was held at Shibuya Take Off 7. On 8 November 2017, her solo debut album Yoshiki Now was released from Rocket Beats., with a release commemoration event held at Tower Records' Shibuya store on the same day. In 2018, she collaborated with Aili on two songs, "Blue" (released on 28 March) and "Twenty" (released on 27 June).

In June 2022, she was cast as Mina (part of the group It's Your Cider) in the film adaptation of the Idol Bu Show franchise. In September 2022, she was cast as Ellie in Kizuna no Allele. In December 2022, she was cast in the rōdoku-geki drama Echo at Kiwa Tennoz, Tokyo.

== Filmography ==
=== Animated television ===
2022

- Dropkick on My Devil! X, Taishō Kōtsū employees
- Lucifer and the Biscuit Hammer, male friend

2023

- Kizuna no Allele, Ellie

=== Animated film ===
2022

- Idol Bu Show, Mina

=== Video games ===
2022

- Black Stella Inferno, Yulia Pelevin Yamada
- The Legend of Heroes: Trails Through Daybreak II, Ariya, etc.

=== Stage performances ===
2023

- Echo (Kiwa Tennoz, Tokyo)
