= Blue Archive =

2021 video game and its franchise

- Key visual of the series (global version), featuring the four playable characters of the Gourmet Research Society (from left to right): Junko, Haruna, Izumi, and Akari.
- Created by: Nexon Games
- Video game
- Developer: Nexon Games (MX Studio branch)
- Publisher: CN/JP: Yostar; WW: Nexon
- Directed by: Kim Yong-ha
- Music by: Mitsukiyo; Karut; Nor
- Genre: Tactical role-playing
- Engine: Unity
- Platform: Android, iOS, HarmonyOS NEXT, Microsoft Windows
- Released: Android/iOS: JP: February 4, 2021; WW: November 8, 2021; CN: August 3, 2023; HarmonyOS NEXT: CN: November 8, 2024; Windows: WW: July 4, 2025; JP: January 20, 2026
- Anime television series

Blue Archive The Animation
- Directed by: Daigo Yamagishi
- Written by: Hiroshi Ōnogi; Daigo Yamagishi
- Music by: 40mP
- Studio: Yostar Pictures; Candy Box
- Licensed by: SA/SEA: Medialink
- Original network: TXN (TV Tokyo), BS11, AT-X
- Original run: April 7, 2024 – June 23, 2024
- Episodes: 12
- Print media
- Manga: Blue Archive: Problem Solver 68 Business Diary; Blue Archive: The Grand Adventure of the Game Development Department
- icon

Blue Archive (Korean: 블루 아카이브; RR: Beullu Akaibeu) is a 2021 real-time strategy role-playing game developed by MX Studio, under the management umbrella of Nexon Games (formerly NAT Games) and IO Division. The player and protagonist is a sensei who was summoned from outside the academic city-state of Kivotos by the president of the General Student Council, an extrajudicial committee governing the culturally rich regional school districts. Following her sudden disappearance, criminal activity rises around Kivotos and the player is tasked by the remaining members of the council to resolve issues that crop up and help search for the president.

It was first released in February 2021 for Android and iOS devices in Japan by Yostar and self-published worldwide in November of the same year by Nexon, with a global release on Microsoft Windows in July 2025 via Steam, barring Benelux, Vietnam, and Germany and Yostar-managed regions. The game is free-to-play with gacha game mechanics as a means to obtain new characters and improvise strategies via team building.

Two short-length original net anime productions were released between July and November 2022; a full-length anime television series adaptation, announced in 2023, was produced by Yostar Pictures and Candy Box, and was broadcast from April to June 2024.

== Gameplay ==
Battles in Blue Archive take place in a real-time strategy format, with students attacking enemies independently while players activate their skills using the interface in the bottom right.

Blue Archive is a tactical role-playing game that allows the player to form and mobilize units of up to six members (two "Specials" and four "Strikers") with which to participate in various military campaigns.

Students' strengths can be enhanced in various ways, such as by increasing their levels, weapons, armor and skills. More students can be recruited through the gacha system using in-game currency, which may be purchased through in-app purchases.

The units are mobilized on a turn-based hex map and battle initiates when they encounter an enemy or vice versa. In combat, Strikers march along a straight path and occasionally do combat with enemy groups. They also fire automatic attacks and can hide behind objects to decrease their chances of getting hit. Specials do not engage in direct combat but increase the Strikers' stats and support them from the backlines instead. The player has no conventional method of control over battles with the exception of using students' skills that cost the team's regenerable synergy bar to use. Students and enemies both have rock-paper-scissors-based attacks and defenses, which determine their strengths and weaknesses. Students get rescued by a helicopter and cannot participate in later battles if they lose all of their health.

== Story ==
=== Setting ===
Blue Archive takes place in the academic city-state of Kivotos, which was established by the union of thousands of academies. The citizens of Kivotos are composed of three races: Humanoids, which include subraces ranging from the common human to resembling angels, demons, elves, bioroids, and kemonomimi retaining lesser features of various animal races such as ears and tails; intelligent werebeast citizens of various races; and highly advanced robots with human levels of intelligence and individuality. Due to possessing Halos, humanoids are surprisingly strong and durable enough to resist and survive serious injuries like gunshots and explosions, though they can only be killed by destroying their Halo through certain means. As a result of this, every student possesses some kind of firearm and/or ordnance as a means to protect themselves and fight back against other students, with frequent campus shootouts happening quite a lot across Kivotos.

The city is ruled by the General Student Council (GSC), a federal committee led by a President, who governs the city from the Sanctum Tower with access to every student's register. Despite the GSC having the main authority within Kivotos, many of the schools operate and lead their districts with virtually autonomous independence with almost every school district having a rich, long-lasting history to them, with the three most powerful schools being Millennium Science School, Trinity General School, and Gehenna Academy.

Before the events of the game, the GSC President summons the player character, a teacher with the education status of Sensei, to be the advisor of SCHALE, an extrajudicial organization established by the president herself. She then proceeds to disappear, which is followed by a rise in criminal activity and military presence in the city. As Sensei helps the students, clubs, and academies of Kivotos with their various problems, the Sensei must also deal with school rivalries, criminal warfare, corrupt corporations, rogue AIs, paranormal creatures, mysterious groups, and insidious cults that threaten Kivotos, often with the assistance of their highly advanced smart-tablet known as the "Shittim Chest" and its sentient AI named Arona.

=== Plot ===
The main story is divided into several Volumes, which focus on a specific group (and sometimes, one or more of its members) in their respective school, in which each volume is also divided into chapters that tell a relatively complete story on their own. There are currently six main story volumes after the prologue, the first four of which lead up to the story's first climactic volume titled "Volume F" that ties those initial volumes together as the first overarching story arc closes and allows future volumes afterwards to exist and evolve, narratively.

==== Volume 1 ====
Abydos High School is in deep debt, and its five remaining students have formed the Foreclosure Task Force. They have been fighting off gangs attacking the school for a long time, and ask SCHALE for help. They investigate and eventually learn that the company the school is in debt to, Kaiser Corporation, orchestrated the events by having the school take out a loan larger than it could afford in the wake of a natural disaster, forcing the school to sell much of the Abydos District land. Kaiser Corporation hired the gangs when the Foreclosure Task Force did not give in and sell the land the Abydos High School is on. As punishment for the Foreclosure Task Force's spying, the Kaiser Corporation requests payment by the end of the week and increases the debt. Hoshino, a member of the Foreclosure Task Force, runs away and joins the Kaiser Corporation in exchange for debt forgiveness. However, she was actually tricked into allowing a mysterious organization that the Kaiser Corporation works with, Gematria, to experiment on her and her Mystic power. With the help of Problem Solver 68, a group of delinquent students from another school that the Kaiser Corporation had hired to attack Abydos High School, the Foreclosure Task Force rescues Hoshino. Later, the Foreclosure Task Force had their debt significantly reduced.

After the events of Volume Final, a long forgotten member of Gematria, Underground Dweller, starts manipulating reality to retrigger Hoshino's trauma related to Yume, the previous Abydos' Student Council president's, pushing it to its limits under the guise of a Dungeons and Dragons game. It culminates into the awakening of Horus of Dawn which also summons a God known as the Fury of Set, both threatening Kivotos. Together, SCHALE, the Foreclosure Task Force and Anubis are able to reach Hoshino, bring her back to her senses and beat the Fury of Set and the Underground Dweller. Later, the Foreclosure Task Force officially becomes newly recognized as Abydos' Student Council and Anubis returns to a familiar, nostalgic feeling Abydos under her old name.

==== Volume 2 ====
Sensei receives a request from the Game Development Department at the Millennium Science School to try and prevent their club from being disbanded due to having less than four members and failing to produce a video game per their club's stated purpose. The Game Development Department decides to explore a ruined section of the Millennium District to look for a special program that can help them make their game. Instead, they find a robot girl named Aris, who develops an obsession with video games. The Game Development Club arranges for Aris to be recruited as their fourth member, steal the program from their school's vault, and be able to create their game in time and avoid dissolution. Sometime later, Aris is kidnapped by Millennium's student council president, Rio, who reveals that Aris is actually the leader of DIVI:SION, an army of hostile robots programmed to destroy Kivotos. Sensei, the Game Development Department, and allies stage a rescue mission and prevent Rio from dismantling Aris. Meanwhile, Aris overcomes her programming, wanting to become a hero instead of being a villain, and DIVI:SION is shut down. Aris returns to the Game Development Department while Rio resigns from her position.

==== Volume 3 ====
SCHALE receives a request from Nagisa at Trinity General School to help root out a traitor who threatens to disrupt the signing of the Eden Treaty between Trinity and Gehenna Academy. Nagisa had already gathered all the suspected traitors in the Make-Up Work Club, whom she plans to have all expelled. Sensei refuses to help Nagisa and instead tries to help the Make-Up Work Club despite Nagisa's meddling. Eventually, it is revealed that the real traitor is Nagisa's friend Mika, who is working with the rogue Arius Squad from the Arius Satellite School. Arius attempts to sabotage the Eden Treaty signing, but Sensei and the Make-Up Work Club are able to thwart their plans, forcing them to retreat. Arius Squad's leader Saori then approaches Sensei and begs for their aid in rescuing her friend Atsuko, whom Gematria member Beatrice plans to sacrifice for a ritual. Sensei is able to convince Arius Squad and Mika to work together to rescue Atsuko while Trinity raids Arius. Beatrice is forced to admit defeat and flees while Mika is pardoned.

==== Volume 4 ====
SCHALE is assigned a task to suppress Rabbit Squad, who are protesting the closure of SRT Special Academy. After subduing and listening to their reasonings, Sensei decides to try and assist the Rabbit Squad, but is initially met with distrust. After much effort and malarkey, Rabbit Squad eventually come to trust Sensei after assisting in saving their camp from a rainstorm, and they begin to investigate mysterious cases of Kaiser Corporation attempting to evict the residents of their district. They uncover a conspiracy where the Valkyrie Police School was secretly buying weapons from Kaiser Corporation which caused a scandal and halts Kaiser's redevelopment plans. After the events of Volume Final, General Student Council Chief of Defense Kaya attempts to overthrow the General Student Council with the help of Fox Squad, who hopes she can restore the SRT Academy. This culminates in Kaya ordering Fox Squad to destroy a train station in a staged terrorist attack, but they are thwarted by Rabbit Squad. Seeing the error of their ways, Fox Squad surrenders and turns over evidence that incriminates Kaya, leading to her arrest.

==== Volume Final ====
With a prophecy predicting Kivotos' impending doom, SCHALE sends a warning to General Student Council Vice President Rin, who tries to organize a meeting. However, other members of the General Student Council censure Rin under the belief she is overstepping her authority, which leads to Kaiser attempting to overthrow the General Student Council and seize Kivotos for themselves. SCHALE, Rabbit Squad, and Valkyrie are able to thwart Kaiser, but massive structures called False Sanctums begin appearing all over the city. While SCHALE organizes the majority of the students to mount a defense against the False Sanctums, they also commandeer a spaceship to attack a space station that appears to be the origin of the False Sanctums. Once on board, they discover that the masterminds are Phrenapates and Anubis, alternate universe versions of the Sensei and Shiroko respectively working for a greater power called the Chroma. SCHALE is able to defeat Phrenapates and Anubis, and they follow Phrenapates' last request to rescue Anubis as the space station explodes, leading to the False Sanctums disappearing. Kivotos begins to rebuild, and Anubis leaves to begin a fresh start.

==== Volume 5 ====
Sensei receives a call to return to Hyakkiyako over a strange letter the student council Ying-Yang Club has received from Nature's Beauty, a club only known in legend. While searching, Sensei meets Yukari, an eccentric miko who rejects her spiritual duties in favor of becoming an official member of the Hyakkaryouran, the highly skilled task force of the region. However, the club is at risk of being disbanded after the disappearance of both its president and vice-president as she tries to do whatever she can to desperately keep it together, however futile it seems. During the festival, Sensei finds vice-president Nagusa and tries to convince her to come back, but to no avail as she deems herself unworthy of the title of president after a failure of a previous mission lead to tragedy. Later on, Shuro of Nature's Beauty, a girl who uses people's failures against them, reveals herself, takes Yukari hostage and summons the ghost story known as Myouki Kurokage to burn Hyakkiyako to the ground. Sensei faces Shuro and reunites the Hyakkaryouran members to fight for their friend. Together, they manage to save Yukari and Hyakkiyako with Nagusa finally accepting the role of president. Meanwhile, Shuro runs away back to her leader, a woman named Kokuriko.

Some time later, the Ying-Yang Club summons Sensei and the Hyakkaryouran to assist in investigating paranormal entities in the northern autonomous district of Ebisu Satellite School, the same area where Nagusa last saw Ayame, Hyakkaryouran's president, before she was presumed dead on a previous mission. Viewing this as a chance to find a cure for Nagusa's spiritual affliction, Sensei joins the group in traveling to Ebisu. There, they are unexpectedly reunited with Ayame, who seemingly appears to be in good health. As they delve deeper into the investigation within a mansion once belonging to the Kadenokouji, Yukari's former family, she discovers that Kokuriko was once a miko and the president of Hyakkaryouran before founding Nature's Beauty. Soon after, Kokuriko, along with Azami—the supposed representative of Ebisu, and Ayame—revealed to have been corrupted by Nature's Beauty, ambushes and captures Yukari and the rest of the group. Ying-Yang Club president Niya is also captured by Ayame, but not before delivering the message to the Ninjutsu Research Club to proceed with the Waraku Festival to disrupt Nature's Beauty's attack. Taking advantage of this, Sensei and the Hyakkaryouran–after being released by Shuro, slips back into Hyakkiyako and rescue Niya, culminating in a final battle between Nagusa and Ayame in a long-awaited succession contest. Nagusa defeats her and Hyakkiyako is saved, though Ayame remains in a coma while the Hyakkaryouran waits for her return.

== Characters ==
This list is limited only to major characters that have appeared in both the game and the TV anime and does not include those that have appeared only in the game and/or had made cameo appearances in the TV anime.

All character names culturally sort family names before given name, including in official English language display. Names with slightly differing native pronunciations from the official English translation will display romaja.

| Character(s) | Voiced by (Korean original) | Voiced by (Japanese localization) |
SCHALE
| Sensei (선생; Seonsaeng) | N/A | Shogo Sakata (Unvoiced & ungendered in-game) |
| Arona (아로나) | Kim Ha-ru | Konomi Kohara |
Abydos High School
| Takanashi Hoshino (타카나시 호시노; Takanasi Hosino) | Jo Kyeong-i | Yumiri Hanamori |
| Sunaōkami Shiroko (스나오오카미 시로코; Seunaookami Siroko) | Lee Da-eun | Yui Ogura |
| Kuromi Serika (쿠로미 세리카) | Kim Bo-na | Ayaka Ōhashi |
| Izayoi Nonomi (이자요이 노노미; Ijayoi Nonomi) | Lee Bo-hee | Chiyuki Miura |
| Okusora Ayane (오쿠소라 아야네) | Bang Si-woo | Sayaka Harada |
Gehenna Academy
| Sorasaki Hina (소라사키 히나) | Park Shin-hee | Ryō Hirohashi |
| Amau Ako (아마우 아코) | Kim Yea-lim | Marika Kōno |
| Shiromi Iori (시로미 이오리; Siromi Iori) | Kang Gyu-ri | Ayane Sakura |
| Hinomiya Chinatsu (히노미야 치나츠; Hinomiya Chinacheu) | Kim Hyeon-ji | Haruka Kōzuki |
| Rikuhachima Aru (리쿠하치마 아루) | Kwon Ji-ae | Reina Kondo |
| Onikata Kayoko (오니카타 카요코) | Kim I-an | Yukiyo Fujii |
| Asagi Mutsuki (아사기 무츠키; Asagi Mucheuki) | Jang Mi | Rumi Okubo |
| Igusa Haruka (이구사 하루카) | Jung Hye-won | Erika Ishitobi |
Trinity General School
| Ajitani Hifumi (아지타니 히후미; Ajitani Hihumi) | Park Shin-hee | Kaede Hondo |

== Development and release ==
The game was first introduced by Nexon Games (formerly NAT Games) and Yostar by its initial name, Project MX. The announcement, alongside the first promotion video and arts was released in February 2020. Yostar announced the mobile game and held closed beta tests for the Android version in July 2020, where it is now known by its current name as Blue Archive. Initially scheduled to be released in 2020, it was later moved to February 4, 2021.

A worldwide version of the game was announced in August 2021. It surpassed one million pre-registrations ahead of its release. The version, which includes English as well as Korean, Traditional Chinese and Thai language support was released on November 8 of the same year by Nexon.

On November 11, 2022, Nexon updated the ratings of the worldwide version of the game to "Mature" from the original "Teen" rating, while releasing a separate "Teen"-rated version of the game exclusively in Korea, particularly due to its rating issues in Korea. The "Teen" rating version has some content changes compared to the original release, mostly of some Live2D's.

A Simplified Chinese version of the game for China release has been revealed in works in March 2023, as the Chinese authority released a statement regarding passing of the games to be played in the country. The game website later went live alongside the first preview on March 31, 2023, with pre-registrations are open on the same day. A closed beta test was done between June and July 2023, and on August 3, 2023, the game finally went live in China as an open beta. The Chinese version is published by Yostar and includes Chinese voice dub for the characters, including the main stories. Yostar later ported this game to HarmonyOS NEXT in November 2024, which is a mobile operating system from Huawei and first revealed at Huawei Devices's Official Bilibili account page, and it was available in mainland China.

In October 2023, Nexon announced that the Global version would be available in the Galaxy Store for Samsung phones. This version was released on October 31.

According to an interview in Taiwan in December 2023, PD Kim Yong Ha explains that they have planned ahead for two years and is expecting 15-years minimum of development with their approach. He also said that for the time being, they are focusing on remediating crash issues that commonly happened in the game, with the reason being that their 3D model has become more complex as time continues. He also said that there is no plan for any PC version of the game for now.

The lineup change of the development team happened in 2024 which saw Byeong-lim Park, once the co-director for the Japanese version of the game left the team to handle a new project alongside two other founding members, Cha Min-seo and Im Jong-gyu. Positions such as main scenario writer and art director changed hands from Isakusan and Hwangsang to Oh Hyun-seok and 9ml respectively. Kim Yong Ha returns to head director position of the game after being in a "supervising role" for a while. While he admits that the sudden announcement of staff changes may concern the players, Yong Ha in an interview assured that the changes will not affect the game in any drastic way.

Nexon reported the game has announced Korean original voices were added to Blue Archive Global version starting on July 23, 2024, on its 3rd anniversary for global. The following year, Nexon announced full Korean voice over for every scene in the main story starting from summer 2025, with Volume 1 updates being released on July 8 of that year and more planned afterwards.

== Media ==
=== Anime ===
==== Original net animations ====
Two short original net animation have been released individually as promotional material of the game. Both titles were produced by Yostar Pictures and released in their official YouTube channels.

The 1.5th Anniversary Short Animation was released on July 16, 2022, as a special 9-minute animation for its summer events and half-anniversary event, featuring Abydos High, Allied Hyakkiyako, Trinity General, and Gehenna Academy students on their quest of preparing for their summer activities.

Beautiful Day Dreamer is another short animation title, featuring the Game Development Department (GDD) from Millenium Science School. The title was released on November 22, 2022, with a duration of around 9 minutes.

The 2.5th Anniversary Short Animation was initially scheduled to be released on July 23, 2023, but was confirmed on a December 24 livestream session that it was ultimately cancelled due to quality issues.

| No. | Title | Original release date |
|---|---|---|
| 1 | "1.5th Anniversary Short Animation" | July 16, 2022 |
Students from numerous academies across Kivotos visit the large shopping mall, where a summer sale is taking place. As they went shopping, several turret robots suddenly went rogue and terrorizes the shoppers. The students arm themselves and successfully neutralize the wave of robots to restore order.
| 2 | "Beautiful Day Dreamer" | November 22, 2022 |
In Millenium Science School, Game Development Department club member Saiba Momoi, overwhelmed by her lack of ideas as their deadline approaches, decides to go out for a walk, when she was invited by Takanashi Hoshino to participate in a baseball game after catching the baseball and throwing back at the Engineering Department, who was testing their grenade launcher to fire baseballs. The next day, as her fellow members play the game against another team, her twin sister, Saiba Midori, was abducted by Kosaka Wakamo, who plans to sacrifice Midori at the Tree of Life to create a new paradise where she could be together with Sensei. Momoi, with help from her clubmates and friends Tendou Alice, and Hanaoka Yuzu, defeat Wakamo in a fight, but not before she destroys the Tree of Life, taking out Yuzu and Alice. Momoi finds her twin sister on a flowery field in place of the crater but freaks out upon being asked whether if she finished her story. Waking up with Midori and the Engineering Department club around her, it is revealed that Momoi was actually knocked out by the baseball and that what she was experiencing was all a dream. However, because of this event, Momoi was able to find inspiration for a new video game.
| 3 | "2.5th Anniversary Short Animation" | Unreleased |

==== Blue Archive the Animation ====
An anime television series adaptation titled Blue Archive The Animation was announced on January 22, 2023. The series is produced by Yostar Pictures and Candy Box and directed by Daigo Yamagishi, with Hiroshi Ōnogi and Yamagishi overseeing series scripts, Shunji Maki serving as assistant director, and Hiromitsu Hagiwara designing the characters and serving as chief animation director.

The anime adapts the two, pre-volume F chapters of the "Countermeasures Committee/Foreclosure Task Force" arc, with the cast reprising their roles from the game. It aired from April 7 to June 23, 2024, on TV Tokyo as part of their new unnamed Sunday midnight anime block and other networks. Medialink has licensed the series in Asia-Pacific (except Australia and New Zealand) and is streaming it on Ani-One Asia YouTube channel. Outside of Asia, the anime can also be seen internationally via its official English channel on YouTube. All Blu-rays were sold with English, Korean, Chinese and Japanese subtitles.

| No. | Title (Note: All English titles are taken from Ani-One Asia channel on YouTube.) | Directed by (Note: Information is taken from the ending credits of each episode.) | Written by | Storyboarded by | Original release date |
|---|---|---|---|---|---|
| 1 | "Abydos High School, Abydos Foreclosure Task Force"; Transliteration: "Abidos Kōtōgakkō Haikō Taisaku Iinkai" (Japanese: アビドス高等学校廃校対策委員会) | Daigo Yamagishi | Hiroshi Ōnogi; Daigo Yamagishi | Daigo Yamagishi | April 7, 2024 |
Inside a train, a bleeding girl asks a mysterious man for his help to avert disaster. At the academy city of Kivotos, the city is still recovering from the chaos following the disappearance of their leader, the General Student Council President. At the Abydos District, the five remaining students of Abydos Academy, Hoshino Takanashi, Nonomi Izayoi, Serika Kuromi, Ayane Okusora and Shiroko Sunaookami, who are also members of the Abydos Foreclosure Task Force, not only deal with desertification affecting their school, but also paying off the school's massive debts and repelling attacks by the Kata-Kata Helmet Gang. One day, Shiroko helps a man who got lost and brings him to school. The man introduces himself as Sensei of SCHALE and he has been sent by the General Student Council to help Abydos with their recent problems. As Shiroko gives a tour of the school to Sensei, the Kata-Kata Helmet Gang attack Abydos. While the Task Force at first has trouble fighting the Helmet Gang, Sensei takes command and helps the Task Force defeat and drive out the gang. Later, Sensei meets a young girl named Arona in a virtual world.
| 2 | "I Don't Approve of You!"; Transliteration: "Watashi wa Mitome Nai!" (Japanese: 私は認めない！) | Shunji Maki | Hiroshi Ōnogi | Shunji Maki | April 14, 2024 |
In a flashback, Sensei helps retake Sanctum Tower and is given the Shittim Chest tablet by Vice President Rin Nanagami. Accessing the tablet, Sensei meets Arona who introduces herself as the Shittim Chest's A.I. Operating System. Back in the present, despite Sensei helping defeat the Helmet Gang, Serika does not trust him due to him being an outsider. During a meeting with the Task Force, they reveal the school owes a massive debt to Kaiser Loans due to past loans taken out to repair damage caused by constant sandstorms, which they must pay off or risk Kaiser Loans taking over the school. After the Task Force secretly follow Serika to her part time job at the Shiba Seki Ramen restaurant, Serika's boss, Master Shiba, and Shiroko tell Serika to trust Sensei. However, the Helmet Gang later kidnap Serika to use her as a hostage. Learning about her kidnapping, Sensei and the Task Force rescue Serika and destroy the tanks chasing them. Realizing he is a good person, Serika shyly thanks Sensei. Later, the Helmet Gang are defeated by another group called Problem Solver 68.
| 3 | "Rest Assured and Leave it to Us, Problem Solver 68"; Transliteration: "Benriya Shikkusutii-Eito ni Omakase Kudasai!" (Japanese: 便利屋68にお任せください！) | Hisanori Kobayashi | Hiroshi Ōnogi; Daigo Yamagishi | Toshihiko Masuda; Daigo Yamagishi | April 21, 2024 |
Sensei and the Task Force hold a meeting to brainstorm ways to make money to pay off the school's debt, but fail to come up with anything sensible or legal. Meanwhile, the mercenary group Problem Solver 68 consisting of Aru Rikuhachima, Mutsuki Asagi, Kayoko Onikata and Haruka Igusa, successfully completes a commission to rescue a stolen cat, but the cat is injured in an explosion they caused, resulting in their payment being forfeited. Broke, Problem Solver 68 arrives at Shiba Seki Ramen at the same time as the Task Force and orders a single bowl of ramen to share between the four of them. Taking pity on them, Master Shiba makes an extra large bowl of ramen for them. Aru ends up befriending the Task Force members, but finds out later from her friends that the Task Force are actually their next targets. The next day, Problem Solver 68 attacks the school with a band of mercenaries, putting the Task Force on the defensive. Sensei then comes up with a plan for Shiroko to ambush Aru, which delays the attack long enough for the other mercenaries to give up when their work hours end. Problem Solver 68 is forced to retreat as the Task Force celebrates their victory. Elsewhere, two men are surprised the Task Force is giving so much resistance, which is interfering with their plans.
| 4 | "The Masked Swimsuit Gang"; Transliteration: "Fukumen Mizugi Dan" (Japanese: 覆面水着団☆) | Kazuma Komatsu | Hiroshi Ōnogi | Ryōsuke Azuma | April 28, 2024 |
Sensing a connection between the gangs attacking Abydos with illegal weapons and Kaiser Loans only taking cash to pay their debts, Sensei and the Task Force head to the black market where criminals sell their illegal wares. While there, Shiroko rescues a Trinity General student named Hifumi Ajitani from some delinquents. Hifumi, having come to the Market to find a rare Peroro doll, is recruited by the Task Force due to her familiarity with the area. After Hifumi shows them the bank where criminals hide their illicit money, the Task Force are shocked to see a Kaiser Loans employee depositing their money to the bank. To confirm their suspicion that the debt money they paid is being used to hire the gangs attacking their school, the Task Force along with Hifumi robs the bank to get the bank's transaction records under disguise as the "Masked Swimsuit Gang". Problem Solver 68, who have come to the bank for a loan, witness the bank robbery in progress, which amazes Aru while being unaware the robbers are the Abydos students. After successfully escaping, the Task Force not only got the records but accidentally stole 100 million Yen as well. Despite Serika's suggestions they use the money they stole to pay off their debts, everyone convinces her not to as using their debt as a excuse to commit crime will make them no different from the gangs who attack them. Instead, they leave the money for Problem Solver 68, with Aru idolizing the Masked Swimsuit Gang until Kayoko points out they are actually the Task Force.
| 5 | "We're not Friends"; Transliteration: "Tomodachi Nanka Ja Nai!" (Japanese: 友達なんかじゃない！) | Ichio Kunimoto | Kuni Tomoyama | Tomomi Umetsu | May 5, 2024 |
The Task Force finds proof from the bank's records that Kaiser Loans has been hiring the gangs attacking their school by funding them using the debt money they have been paying. Shiroko suspects the Kaiser Corporation, Kaiser Loans' parent company, is involved and that they have much bigger plans for Abydos. While Hifumi promises to help her new friends by asking Trinity's Student Council, the Tea Party, for help, Hoshino doubts it since the other powerful schools know about Abydos' debts but choose to turn a blind eye on it. The next day, despite Problem Solver 68's gaining money from the Task Force, Aru refuses to use it out of pride and plans to continue their contract with Kaiser. While having breakfast at Shiba Seki, a miscommunication between Aru and Haruka causes the latter to blow up the restaurant with a bomb. Aru is horrified of the destruction but to keep up her image as a ruthless outlaw, she claims responsibility when the Task Force minus Hoshino confronts them. Before both groups start fighting, they are suddenly attacked by artillery fire from a third party, who are revealed to be Gehenna Academy's Prefect Team.
| 6 | "Gehenna Prefect Team"; Transliteration: "Gehena Fūuki Iinkai" (Japanese: ゲヘナ風紀委員会) | Zhu Xiao | Kuni Tomoyama | Zhu Xiao | May 12, 2024 |
The Prefect Team forces, led by Iori Shiromi and Chinatsu Hinomiya, demand the handover of Problem Solver 68 as they are wanted Gehenna students but the Task Force refuses since the Prefect Team launched an unprovoked attack and invaded their territory. Sensei intervenes to stop the fighting and is contacted by Prefect Team Senior Administrator, Ako Amau. Ako apologizes for her troop's actions and didn't know Sensei was there but still demands the Task Force help them. However, Problem Solver 68 decides to help the Task Force and Kayoko calls out on Ako's lies as her true target is actually Sensei. Ako admits she orchestrated the hunt for Problem Solver 68 as an excuse to capture Sensei as she views him as an unknown threat for the upcoming peace treaty between Trinity and Gehenna. Ako orders another attack but the Task Force and Problem Solver 68 defeat them thanks to Sensei's commands. Ako is forced to stand down when Prefect Team President, Hina Sorasaki, arrives on the scene to scold Ako for not only attacking another school's territory but also doing so behind her back. As the Prefect Team retreats, Hina apologizes to Sensei and a recently arrived Hoshino for her subordinates' actions but not before telling Sensei that the Kaiser Corporation are conducting mysterious operations at the Abydos desert.
| 7 | "I Can Only Move Forward..."; Transliteration: "Mae ni Susumu shika..." (Japanese: 前に進むしか...) | Masaoki Nakajima | Hiroshi Ōnogi | Masaoki Nakajima | May 19, 2024 |
In a flashback, a mysterious black suited man proposes to Hoshino "an offer she can't refuse". In the present, while punishing Ako by making her write a thousand apology letters, Hina reveals Hoshino was once an elite student feared by Gehenna in the past. Elsewhere, Problem Solver 68 are forced to move out of their office for failing to pay their rent along with Kaiser and the Prefect Team hunting them. They encounter Shiroko, who while still angry at them for blowing up Shiba Seki, she forgives them for helping them against the Prefect Team and learning they're giving the stolen bank money to Master Shiba to rebuild his restaurant and parts with them on good terms. Suspicious with recent events, Sensei asks Arona to search for information about Kaiser Corporation and Hoshino. During a meeting, Sensei and the Task Force learns Abydos District, along with the homes and buildings around the school, while were originally under Abydos Academy's jurisdiction, were secretly transferred to the Kaiser Corporation several years ago and they are now sending eviction notices to its residents. Despite their grim situation, Hoshino cheers everyone up by suggesting they take a trip to an aquarium.
| 8 | "Secret"; Transliteration: "Himitsu" (Japanese: 秘密) | Katsushi Sakurabi | Yostar Pictures | Terushige Watanabe; Daigo Yamagishi | May 26, 2024 |
Sensei and the Task Force head to the Aquarium where they enjoy watching the animals on display there including getting a group photo taken by Yuuka Hayase and Noa Ushio from Millennium Science School. During their trip, Shiroko confronts Hoshino over where she actually was during the attack by the Prefect Team but Hoshino dodges the question. The next morning while riding to school, Shiroko sees Hoshino inside a limo. After the Task Force meeting, Shiroko confronts Hoshino and demands to know what secrets is she hiding and why was she in a limo which Hoshino tries to lie again. Shiroko then recovers a document from Hoshino's bag before Sensei and Nonomi arrive to stop the fight between the two. Nonomi tries to calm Shiroko and let Hoshino leave, telling the former that Hoshino might have a good reason for hiding a secret. Elsewhere, "Black Suit" proclaims his plan is working as he looks over a transfer contract. Later, Shiroko shows Sensei the letter in Hoshino's bag, a school withdrawal letter, which Sensei promises to investigate.
| 9 | "Heading to the Abydos Desert"; Transliteration: "Abidos Sabaku e" (Japanese: アビドス砂漠へ) | Shinichi Tabe | Hiroshi Ōnogi | Takafumi Hoshikawa; Daigo Yamagishi | June 2, 2024 |
Hoshino remembers her past when she was a cynical student and Yume, Hoshino's senior and Abydos' student council president, still believed they could bring back the school to its glory days much to Hoshino's ire. In the present, the Task Force learns the previous Abydos Student Council legally sold most of their land to Kaiser in the past to pay off the interest rate of their debt, until the school itself was the only land still left under Abydos ownership. Since the Student Council, which is the only organization with the authority to transfer Abydos' land, disbanded, Kaiser's only recourse to legally obtain the school is to coerce the remaining students to leave. Realizing Kaiser's real goal is not money but the entire Abydos district, the Task Force head towards the Abydos desert thanks to the information provided by Hina. Upon arrival, they discover a large military base operated by the Kaiser Private Military Company. However, the Task Force are discovered by Kaiser PMC led by the Kaiser Director. Recognizing Hoshino as the current Abydos vice-president, the Director admits Kaiser wants to take over Abydos as they're looking for a "hidden treasure" beneath the desert. The Director also threatens the Task Force to leave and not interfere with Kaiser's plans by having their monthly debt payment increase by 3000%, and Hoshino orders the Task Force to retreat. With the Task Force worried with their new problems, Sensei confronts Hoshino over her withdrawal letter. While she doesn't explain to Sensei why she is dropping out, she admits she loves Abydos Academy and will tell the truth to everyone tomorrow.
| 10 | "The Only Place That Matters"; Transliteration: "Yui'itsu Imi no Aru Basho" (Japanese: 唯一意味のある場所) | Shunji Maki | Hotaru Asafuji | Shunji Maki | June 9, 2024 |
Sensei and the Task Force find a letter written by Hoshino including her withdrawal letter, where she reveals in order to save Abydos Academy, she agreed to drop out and join Kaiser PMC in exchange for Kaiser wiping out their debts, and apologizes to everyone for not telling them personally and ask them to kill her if they ever face each other in battle. The Kaiser PMC army then attacks Abydos district. The Task Force confronts the Kaiser Director, who reveals he and Black Suit tricked Hoshino as their way of wiping off Abydos' debt is by destroying the school. Since Hoshino was the last member of the Abydos Student Council officially recognized by the General Student Council while the Task Force was never officially recognized, Kaiser can invade the now ownerless Abydos Academy unopposed. Just as the Task Force loses hope, Problem Solver 68 come to their aid and remind them of their resolve to save their school no matter the odds. With their morale restored, the Task Force and Problem Solver 68 fight and defeat Kaiser PMC, forcing them to retreat. As the Task Force vows to rescue Hoshino, Black Suit reveals to a captured Hoshino that he was using Kaiser to get her due to the power she possesses. After that, Hoshino realized she has been deceived, apologizes to everyone she felt she had failed on them before she is tied up and held captive.
| 11 | "Because She is my Student"; Transliteration: "Watashi no Seito Dakara" (Japanese: 私の生徒だから) | Shinichi Tabe | Kuni Tomoyama | Shinichi Tabe | June 16, 2024 |
Sensei has a meeting with Black Suit face to face. Black Suit reveals just like Sensei, he isn't from Kivotos and is part of an organization called Gematria, who research and discover the secrets of Kivotos. Black Suit invites Sensei to join Gematria but he refuses as he wants to save Hoshino as she is still his student since he never signed and approved her withdrawal letter. Despite his confusion on why Sensei cares about the students, Black Suit gives up and tells Sensei that Hoshino is being held at the Kaiser PMC base. With this new information, the Task Force attempt to get help from Trinity and Gehenna to attack Kaiser but both schools need some time to help. Problem Solver 68 is also unsure whether they should help them. Despite these setbacks, Sensei and the Task Force decide to proceed with their plan to rescue Hoshino, trusting that their allies will come around to help them.
| 12 | "I'm Back"; Transliteration: "Tadaima" (Japanese: ただいま) | Shunji Maki; Daigo Yamagishi; Zhu Xiao | Hotaru Asafuji | Shunji Maki; Daigo Yamagishi | June 23, 2024 |
Sensei commands the Task Force as they assault and breach the Kaiser PMC Base. The Kaiser Director orders all of his forces to attack the Task Force but they are defeated by the timely arrival of Hifumi and Trinity's artillery force, the Prefect Team, and Problem Solver 68. As the Task Force head inside the base, Hoshino blames herself for all what has happened until she remembers a conversation she had with Yume about valuing her friends and classmates should be considered a miracle, and she decides to atone for her mistakes by reuniting with her friends. Just as Hoshino tries to escape, the defeated Kaiser Director activates the base's self-destruct program which causes to Hoshino to fall off a bridge until Shiroko rescues her. When Hoshino wakes up, she realizes Sensei and the Task Force saved her and thanks them for still trusting her. In the epilogue, the Prefect Team continue their job dealing with trouble making students, Hifumi attends a Peroro exhibit, Problem Solver 68 dines at the rebuilt Shiba Seki restaurant, Sensei speaks with Arona, and the Foreclosure Task Force continue their everyday school life, as an officially recognized club approved by Sensei of SCHALE.

=== Print media ===
The game has released several official print media such as anthology comics, spinoff manga series and official artwork books.

==== Blue Archive Official Artworks ====
A series of artwork compilation book of the game titled Blue Archive Official Artworks is published by Ichijinsha under its DNA Media Comics label with its first volume releases on October 5, 2022. The first volume contains various designs concepts and profile of the characters and other related art materials throughout the first year events of the game, as well as guest artworks and staff interviews. The second volume which covers materials from the second year of the game was released on December 19, 2023.

The book is also published in Traditional Chinese and Korean by Nexon.

==== Anthology comics ====
An anthology comic series named Blue Archive Anthology Comic, consisting of various short story comic from various artists, has been announced in production on July 24, 2021, and the first volume of the comic is released on July 26, 2021, by Ichijinsha. As of January 2026, eight volumes has been released.

| No. | Japanese release date | Japanese ISBN |
|---|---|---|
| 1 | July 26, 2021 | 978-4-7580-2270-5 |
| 2 | December 25, 2021 | 978-4-7580-229-10 |
| 3 | July 25, 2023 | 978-4-7580-2565-2 |
| 4 | March 25, 2024 | 978-4-7580-267-27 |
| 5 | June 25, 2024 | 978-4-7580-267-27 |
| 6 | December 24, 2024 | 978-4-7580-282-40 |
| 7 | July 25, 2025 | 978-4-7580-2944-5 |
| 7 | January 23, 2026 | 978-4-7580-8928-9 |

Another anthology comic series named Blue Archive Dengeki Anthology Comic is released by Kadokawa Corporation under Dengeki Comics EX label on February 3, 2023.

==== Problem Solver 68 Business Diary ====
A spinoff manga titled Blue Archive: Problem Solver 68 Business Diary (Japanese: ブルーアーカイブ 便利屋68業務日誌, romanized: Blue Archive Benriya 68 Gyōmu Nisshi), focusing on the characters from the group Problem Solver 68. The manga is released monthly by Bushiroad in their website Comic Growl (formerly Comic Bushiroad Web) starting on October 14, 2022, with Kaede Nogiwa as the artist. The first volume of the manga has been released on June 8, 2023. As of June 2026, six volumes have been released. The series is licensed in English by Kaiten Books.

| No. | Original release date | Original ISBN | English release date | English ISBN |
|---|---|---|---|---|
| 1 | June 8, 2023 | 978-4-04-899569-6 | July 12, 2024 | 978-1-952241-71-0 |
| 2 | January 6, 2024 | 978-4-04-899582-5 | — | — |
| 3 | July 8, 2024 | 978-4-04-899630-3 | — | — |
| 4 | February 7, 2025 | 978-4-04-899659-4 | — | — |
| 5 | September 8, 2025 | 978-4-04-899770-6 | — | — |
| 6 | June 8, 2026 | 978-4-04-921133-7 | — | — |

==== The Grand Adventure of the Game Development Department ====
Another spinoff manga titled Blue Archive: The Grand Adventure of the Game Development Department (Japanese: ブルーアーカイブ ゲーム開発部だいぼうけん！, romanized: Blue Archive Game Kaihatsubu Daibouken!) has been announced in production during the live stream on October 20, 2023, focusing on the characters from the group Game Development Department. Asato Mizu illustrated the manga and began serialization on Square Enix's Gangan Online manga website on December 31, 2023. The series' chapters are collected into tankōbon volumes. The first volume was released on June 12, 2024. As of June 2026, six volumes have been released. The series is published in English on Square Enix's Manga Up! Global website and app.

=== Music ===
==== Theme songs ====
A few songs have been used throughout the game versions. "Clear Morning", by Yui Ogura is used as the main theme song for the Japanese version of the game, with the single is released on March 31, 2021. "Target for love" by Lee Jin-ah is selected as the worldwide version theme song of the game, with separate versions of Korean and English is used for international version respectively. For Chinese version, "Blue Canvas" by ClariS is used as a regional theme song.

Other themes used in the game are "Kagayaki Summer Days" and "Our Quest", which are used in their short animation titles and sung by various voice actors of the game, "Memories of Kindness", the theme for Volume F ending sung by Kano in Japanese and Younha for its Korean and English versions. Younha also sings "Thanks to", which is a special theme song for its 1.5 anniversary event in South Korea in English and Korean.

==== Original soundtracks ====
The original soundtracks of the game are composed mostly by Mitsukiyo, Karut and Nor. Other composers do periodically contribute to its tracks such as Aiobahn for the crossover event with A Certain Scientific Railgun series.

These soundtracks has been subsequently compiled and released in the Japanese market under the album series titled Blue Archive Original Soundtrack, with first volume released on March 24, 2022.

On January 18, 2024, three albums has been released globally on streaming platforms.

== Cultural impact and reception ==
=== Popularity ===
While originally criticized due to lack of content and various in-game bugs that hampered the initial experience, the game has marked spikes in popularity later on with their improvements, with it now enjoying a huge successful fanbase especially in the Asia–Pacific region (such as Southeast Asia, Japan and South Korea).

The game had experienced a surge in popularity at Comiket in 2023, with the data for its C102 event in Summer 2023 showing the game had the highest number of circles participating in the general net social games section, with 894 circles selling doujinshi products for the game alone. This is a spike of increase from 446 circles for their Winter 2022 event (C101). Due to its reception, the game moves from the general net social games section to their own section in the Winter 2023 Comiket (C103) onwards, with genre code 336. The numbers doubles to 1718 circles in C103 and expands to 1922 circles in C104. It was reported that some prominent staff like chief developer PD Kim Yong Ha and sound composer Mitsukiyo also visited the booths in the events and met the artists as a form of support. Based on a December 16, 2023, survey conducted by Nikkei Entertainment, the fanbase of Blue Archive within Japan has an average age of 24 years, and a male-to-female ratio that skews 80:20.

The game also has attracted some well-known manga artists and animators to become fans and also produce fan art for the game. One of the most notable is Aki Hamazi, the author of Bocchi the Rock!, who participates in the C101 event with her own circle producing Blue Archive doujinshi. As her own work recently became much more popular, with the anime adaptation finished airing a week before the event, her activity attracted a lot of fans to line up at her booth. This prompted the organiser to move her booth outside the hall to avoid congestion and her booth quickly sold out just noon of the first day of the event. She continued her involvement in the next Comiket with Blue Archive doujinshi and has also contributed to some official promotional art of the game.

The game also has generally received a positive reception, particularly among fans of the gacha and anime RPG genres. Its launch on Steam in July 2025 has further broadened its audience. However, Nexon terminated an in-game event that incentivized players to leave reviews on Steam, as it was discovered to potentially conflict with Steamworks documentation against artificially manipulating the review system. While the event was stopped and rewards were not distributed, the game's positive rating has largely remained.

==== Awards ====
According to Dengeki Online's Kawachi commented that "both the allies and the enemies are fascinating." Dengeki Online's Jismarock praised the "Eden Treaty Arc" scenario as being aggressive, even if it only clarified the concept of "death," which had been unclear in previous scenarios. Blue Archive won the Best Developer Award, Character Award, and Popularity Award at the 2022 Korea Game Awards.

Blue Archive has won an award from market research firm Sensor Tower for best storytelling, beating out other contemporary competitions such as Fate/Grand Order and Honkai: Star Rail.

==== Revenue ====
Their total revenue until October 2023 has reached over $400 million for all their versions. The Japanese version of the game contributed 75% of it. In August 2023, the game recorded $19 million for the Japanese version, and $4 million for their global version, the total revenue was $24 million.

=== Controversies ===
The global version received censorship in some of their scenes in comparison of their Japanese version. In response to this, chief developer PD Kim Yong Ha stated that they needed to abide by "external requests" to be able to market their game in other regions, apologizing to the players for not keeping his promises. Censorship efforts at the time have since been reversed with the introduction of two separately rated versions, a "Teen" version exclusive to Korea and the Global version with Multi-language support and no cut content.

In October 2022, the South Korea rating board, Game Rating and Administration Committee (GRAC), increased the age rating of Blue Archive from 15+ to 18+. GRAC was later audited by Ministry of Culture, Sports and Tourism and was found to be guilty in June 2023 for embezzlement worth of KR₩700 million (US$500,000) in taxpayer money. A few presses claimed this is an indirect result of Blue Archive players launching a petition calling for the rating board's investigation prior, which allegedly instigated Lee Sang-Heon of the Democratic Party of Korea to demand Korean National Audit to inspect the board independently.

On October 18, 2024, the 3rd anniversary live listed Taiwan and Hong Kong as countries, which aroused dissatisfaction among a large number of players in the Chinese server. On the same day, the Chinese server issued a statement through Bilibili to express its firm support for the One China policy. On October 20, the global server issued the statement in Chinese, English, Thai and Korean on Twitter and Facebook. In turn, their statements aroused dissatisfaction among players in the global server.

In July 2026, changes to Blue Archive's gacha and pity system sparked backlash from players, partly due to their announcement shortly before implementation, leading to review bombing of the game's Steam version. Executive producer Kim Yong-ha later apologized, acknowledging that the team's communication had caused confusion and damaged players' trust.
