= Party Rockets GT =

Japanese idol girl group

- Origin: Japan
- Genres: J-pop
- Years active: 2012––2020
- Label: Rocket Beats
- Members: Haruka Yoshiki (HARUKA); Ayumi Horio (AYUMI); Nanase Morinaga (NANASE); SAE
- Past members: Airi Tsujimura; Hiyori Sato; Yuuka Konno; Koume Watanabe; Akari Fujita; ARISA; Fumika Kikuchi (FUMIKA); HIMEKA; Arisa Tanino (ARISA)
- Website: partyrockets.net

Party Rockets GT (Japanese: Party Rockets GT, Hepburn: Pātīrokettsu Jītī) was a Japanese idol girl group formed in 2012. They participated in the 2015 Tokyo Idol Festival. Their single "Let’s Go!!" reached the 15th place on the Weekly Oricon Singles Chart.

They disbanded after their final tour on February 24, 2020.

== Discography ==
=== Albums ===
Release date	Title	Oricon (Note: Peak ranking on the weekly Oricon Albums Chart.)	Ref.
December 17, 2014	"TRIANGLE"	141	
January 11, 2017	"Time of your life"	40	

=== Singles ===
Release date	Title	Oricon (Note: Peak ranking on the weekly Oricon Singles Chart.)	Ref.
August 15, 2012	"初恋ロケット"	73	
February 27, 2013	"MIRAIE"	28	
August 21, 2013	"セツナソラ"	32	
April 9, 2014	"Let’s Go!!"	15	
August 27, 2014	"KASABUTA"	52	
February 24, 2016	"虹色ジェット"	36	
July 20, 2016	"真夏のマジ☆ロケット"	20	
May 17, 2017	"START!!"	13	
March 14, 2018	"NON STOP ROCK"	44	
December 11, 2018	"闇夜に燈"	46	

== DVDs ==
Release date	Title	Ref.
April 22, 2015	Party Rocketsワンマンライブ～FULL THROTTLE～	
