= Kizuna AI =

Japanese virtual YouTuber

- A.I. Channel character
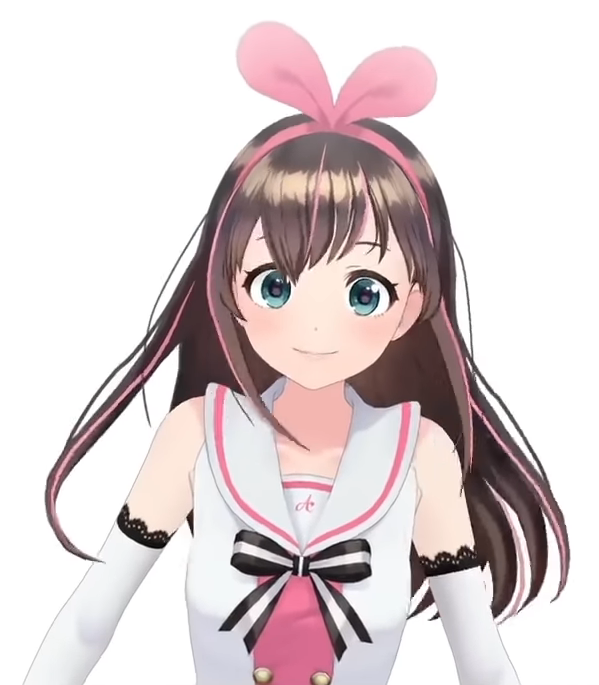
- First appearance: 29 November 2016
- Created by: En Morikura (character design); Tomitake (3D model)
- Portrayed by: Kizuna AI: Nozomi Kasuga

In-universe information
- Full name: Kizuna AI (Bundled Love)
- Alias: Oyabun
- Nicknames: AI-chan; Ponkotsu AI (Useless AI)
- Species: Artificial intelligence
- Gender: Female
- Occupation: YouTuber

Kizuna AI

Bilibili information
- Channel: AIChannel官方
- Years active: 2017–present
- Genres: Music, Livestream, Clips, Skits
- Followers: 1.99 million

YouTube information
- Channels: A.I.Channel; A.I.Games; A.I.Channel China
- Years active: 29 November 2016 – 26 February 2022; 26 February 2025 – present
- Genres: Music, Livestream, Clips, Skits
- Subscribers: AI Channel: 3.09 million; AI Games: 1.34 million; A.I.Channel China: 44 thousand
- Views: AI Channel: 516 million; AI Games: 191 million; A.I.Channel China: 1.635 million
- Last updated: 2 March 2026
- Website: kizunaai.com

Kizuna AI (Japanese: キズナアイ, Hepburn: Kizuna Ai) is a Japanese virtual YouTuber (VTuber) and fictional character currently part of Kizuna AI Inc., a subsidiary of digital entertainment company Activ8. From her debut in 2016 until 2021, she was the most subscribed VTuber on YouTube, with more than 4 million subscribers across three YouTube channels and 1 million subscribers on the Chinese video platform Bilibili. Kizuna AI posted her first YouTube video on her "A.I.Channel" on 29 November 2016. A second channel, "A.I.Games", was opened in March 2017 for gaming content, and a third, "A.I.Channel China", opened in June 2019 for a Chinese audience.

Although the first channel to use a Computer Generated (CG) avatar for vlogging purposes on YouTube was the channel of English-Japanese Ami Yamato, who debuted her first video in 2011, Kizuna was the world's first modern virtual YouTuber with characteristics typically ascribed to them, much like the one who coined the term Virtual YouTuber. Kizuna's video content is similar to many other YouTubers, consisting primarily of discussions, Q&A videos, and more traditional "Let's Play" videos, although in years later, she also began to livestream at least one time per week. Because Kizuna primarily communicates in Japanese, fans contributed translations for her videos, and there were entire unofficial communities built around these translators, filling the void of an official English community until 2020 when official subtitles started. Kizuna has performed at various anime conventions, at virtual concerts, and has also worked with many game companies. She has also appeared on television shows and has starred in commercials not limiting herself to YouTube, to the point of appearing in mid-Shibuya. She has become a popular virtual celebrity worldwide.

Starting in 2016, Kizuna AI was originally managed directly by Activ8, the company that created her, under the name Project A.I. In 2018, the project was moved to in-house agency upd8. Following an announcement on 24 April 2020, Activ8 announced that Kizuna AI was moved from upd8 to a new subsidiary company dedicated exclusively to her, called Kizuna AI Inc. With the announcement, Japanese voice actress Nozomi Kasuga (春日望) also disclosed her role as the voice model of Kizuna AI and advisor of the new company. Kizuna AI Inc. formally started activities on 11 May 2020, with Eriko Matsumoto (松本恵利子) as the CEO.

== Production ==
Kizuna is an online virtual character completely constructed using software. As the identities of producers in the background are not revealed, video animators, producers, video editors, and players of games are unknown. Kizuna's YouTube channels are thought to be managed by an entire production crew, and the choice to remain anonymous comes from the wish to keep the concept of a virtual idol intact. This has caused speculation regarding the operation crew and technology. Kizuna's videos are produced by Tokyo-based digital production company Activ8.

All crew members known so far to be involved in Kizuna's design are already well known. These include En Morikura in character design, Tomitake in 3D modelling, and Tda in modelling supervision. Morikura is an artist well known for illustration. Tomitake has designed many 3D models, and works alongside Tda, an expert in the MikuMikuDance 3D modelling field.

The identity of Kizuna AI's voice model had long been unknown; however, on 24 April 2020 it was announced on Twitter that voice actress Nozomi Kasuga provides her voice.

=== Design and personality ===
Kizuna is aware that she is a virtual character, and claims that she is an independent artificial intelligence (hence the "AI" in her name). An October 2018 article from BBC Capital noted a Mattel advertisement campaign for Barbie in 2015 with the same concept.

In her first video, Kizuna introduces herself. Apart from the general meaning of "artificial intelligence", "AI" is also a pun on the kanji "愛", meaning "love" while "Kizuna" (絆) means to bond, bind and/or connect. Kizuna is designed as a young and beautiful 2.5D animated girl with moe elements, which attracts many YouTube users. Kizuna's appearance age is roughly sixteen years old, though she revealed that she is only five, with her birthday on 30 June. She has a height of 156 cm (5 ft 1 in), a weight of roughly 46 kg (101 lb), and her three measurements are 85-59-83 (34–24–33).

Kizuna's overall appearance uses a pink and white color palette. She has long flowing hair, coupled with a futuristic gradient hair dye of pink. She wears a pink wobbly hairband with a butterfly knot. The hairband has a double-leaf heart-shaped design, corresponding to the word "Ai", meaning "love", in her name, and Kizuna's sleeveless white top brings about a futuristic aesthetic. It is designed to put emphasis on her back and body, as well as to make her appear slimmer. Embroidered above her chest is the letter "A". Her arm sleeves and thigh highs are decorated with lace, while her thigh highs and shorts form a zettai ryoiki area in her design.

Kizuna is a passionate fan of Love Live! and Love Live! School Idol Festival; her favourite character is Nico Yazawa. During an interview with Panora, Kizuna mentioned that she pays close attention to idol groups such as Keyakizaka46 and Nogizaka46. Kizuna likes how idols follow their dreams just like herself. In her character design, she also likes to spend time in virtual space playing video games.

=== Technology used ===
Kizuna is able to livestream and record videos in a virtual environment; this is generally considered to rely on the freeware MikuMikuDance. After the production crew designs a 3D model, they manually control the model to make certain movements. Then, they hire a voice actor to give the animation a voice. MikuMikuDance has often been used in the videos of Vocaloid pop music, allowing users to import and control the 3D models of virtual characters such as Hatsune Miku.

Others think that Kizuna's facial expressions and eye changes are done through motion capture or facial tracking using facial recognition software such as FaceRig. Some feel that Kizuna is a result of applying this technology to 3D models, similarly by projecting facial expressions onto a virtual reality model. At the same time, some think that omni-directional motion capture technology is being used. Both methods allow Kizuna to more closely assume anatomically correct expressions and actions, overall making Kizuna's videos more similar to those of other female YouTubers.

== Activities ==
The YouTube channel "A.I.Channel" was created on 18 October 2016, though Kizuna only started posting videos on 29 November 2016. She creates, designs and hosts a series of videos with a mix of comedic and serious elements. These videos are designed to break the boundaries between virtual and real spaces, and involves activities such as television-like show-hosting and virtual reality. The production crew also wishes for the audience to get in touch with and experience the newest technology, even allowing users to interact directly with Kizuna in virtual space.

Kizuna posts videos almost every day on YouTube, and is recognized as an active user of the video-sharing platform. With over two million subscribers as of October 2018, Kizuna is one of YouTube's most-watched Japanese content creators. She is also gaining traction in regions around the globe.

In January 2017, Kizuna joked that because her clothes are merely holographic projections, she is technically always nude. YouTube detected the video's use of the word "naked" and decided that it contained inappropriate content, thus "A.I.Channel" was banned. The content had to be posted on another video sharing site, Niconico. After several weeks, the channel was unbanned in February. Despite the ban, Kizuna's popularity grew tremendously and her subscriber count reached 100,000 on 25 February.

By the end of March, Kizuna had already uploaded more than 60 videos. "A.I.Channel" had exceeded 200,000 subscribers and 5 million comments. On 31 March, Kizuna started releasing gaming content on a new channel named "A.I.Games". "A.I.Games" was blocked for unknown reasons on 17 April but was unblocked and resumed posting videos within a day.

"A.I.Channel" reached 2 million subscribers on 15 July 2018. "A.I.Games" also reached 1 million subscribers on 14 August 2018.

=== Other activities ===
Apart from her YouTube channels and official website, Kizuna has also created Twitter, Instagram, and TikTok accounts to facilitate interaction with fans. She also holds limited-time events occasionally, such as a Valentine's Day chocolate giveaway in 2017.

Kizuna accepted an interview by PANORA, a website focusing on the topic of virtual reality. The interview was divided into four parts and posted on Kizuna AI's official website. Then, on 25 and 26 March 2017, Kizuna performed and then interacted with fans live on the stage of AnimeJapan.

In April 2017, a collaboration between Kizuna and Japanese video game development company Asobimo was announced. On the newly created "A.I.Games" channel, Kizuna would periodically post videos of her doing a commentary while playing Avabel Online, a MMORPG designed by Asobimo for smartphones. Kizuna would also appear directly in the game. Afterwards, there would occasionally be video advertisements for the game.

Kizuna is the ambassador for one of the Japan National Tourism Organization's Come to Japan campaign and appeared in endorsements for SoftBank. She has also hosted a television variety show titled Kizuna AI no BEAT Scramble (キズナアイのBEATスクランブル, Kizuna AI no BEAT Sukuranburu), which aired on Japan's BS NTV channel from 6 April 2018. She also voiced Website Manager Hachi in the anime television series Magical Girl Site, which aired from the same day.

To celebrate reaching 2 million subscribers on "A.I.Channel" on 15 July 2018, Kizuna released her first Eurodance digital single "Hello, Morning".

On 1 March 2019, Dutch music duo W&W released a song called The Light in which Kizuna features as a vocalist and as a dancer.

In October 2020, Active8 Inc. and Gemdrops Inc. released a rhythm VR game based on Kizuna AI called Kizuna Ai – Touch The Beat.

On 6 November 2020, she appeared as herself in season 2, episodes 4 and 5 of the Australian web series Meta Runner. In the episode, she is a guide for "Pocket Gakusei", an in-universe online dating simulator.

On 30 January 2021, Kizuna AI released a clothing collaboration with the Dutch streetwear brand Kaomoji.

Between March and May 2021, Kizuna AI planned a virtual tour with the intention of exploring and creating new virtual possibilities. This tour consisted of 2 shows, one set in Los Angeles and one set in New York. An online DJ event "CONTACT YOU presented by DJ Kizuna AI" was held by DJ Kizuna AI. Guests for the Los Angeles live show included TeddyLoid and Nyanners who have a large number of followers in the United States.

In 2021, Kizuna Ai had a special costume as part of Fall Guys.

In early December 2021, Kizuna AI announced that she is holding a tour in February called "hello, world 2022". She also announced that after the tour, she would be going on an "indefinite hiatus".

In February 2022, Kizuna AI announced that a spin-off character would take Kizuna's place during her hiatus.

On 26 February 2025, Kizuna AI resumed her activities from her three-year hiatus, with release of her new single "Kamo ne". She plans to focus on making music, teasing on a new album release and a live concert for the year.

In January 2026 Kizuna AI became part of Fortnite in a collaboration.

==== Anime adaptation ====
In February 2022, Kizuna AI announced that an anime project was in production. The anime project was later confirmed to be a television series titled Kizuna no Allele that aired from April to June 2023, on TV Tokyo and other networks. The series is produced by Wit Studio and Signal.MD and directed by Kenichiro Komaya, with Deko Akao writing the scripts, Shiori Asaka and Niina Morita designing the characters and serving as chief animation directors alongside Mizuki Takahashi, and Go Sakabe composing the music. Crunchyroll licensed the series in North America, Oceania, and selected European territories.

A second season premiered in October 2023.

== Videos ==
Similar to other YouTubers, Kizuna acts as a host on her YouTube channels, creating and uploading various original types of entertainment-related videos, thereby attracting viewers to subscribe to her channels. Kizuna's videos contain much content similar to other video bloggers. Kizuna will also imitate the interesting behaviour of other YouTubers. The style of these videos is comedic and uses technology to let Kizuna move smoothly. Videos sometimes add content of a more imaginative or animated style, though bugs in the software may cause her to move somewhat erratically at times.

On average, Kizuna's videos are about ten minutes long. Video content includes chatting, sharing life stories, answering questions, fulfilling requests, hosting discussions on trending topics, interviews, "Let's Plays", dancing, challenges, and drawing. She has discussed artificial intelligence, virtual reality, games, things she likes, and how she wants a Wikipedia page dedicated to herself. She has also talked about buying friends with money, and her desired furniture.

=== Games ===
Kizuna often posts videos of herself giving commentaries while playing games on YouTube. As a virtual Let's Play show host, Kizuna's game operating techniques seem a little clumsy, though like other gaming YouTubers, she makes seemingly real comments and reactions to the games that she likes. The most viewed and most popular gaming video by Kizuna is her Let's Play of popular indie game Inside.

Some of Kizuna's videos involve augmented and virtual reality games. Using omnidirectional motion capture technology, a 3D model of Kizuna playing a game can be developed. Virtual reality games played by Kizuna include extreme sports game The Climb, first-person shooter game Superhot, drawing software Tilt Brush, and more. Kizuna has also attempted to describe English words in Quick, Draw!, explore Tokyo virtually using Google Maps, and talk with other AI such as Apple's iPhone Assistant Siri.

A rhythm video game, titled Kizuna AI: Touch the Beat!, was released in February 2023 on PlayStation 5 (via PlayStation VR2), which was followed by a release on Microsoft Windows (via Steam), Nintendo Switch, and PlayStation 4 (via PlayStation VR) in May.

=== Languages ===
The language used in all of Kizuna's videos is Japanese. This made it difficult for a large portion of viewers to understand specific content of videos. Afterwards, "A.I.Channel" and "A.I.Games" allowed bilingual fans to translate Japanese in videos to other languages. With the help of translations offered by fans, Kizuna's channels were able to offer content in many different languages including Japanese, English, Korean, Spanish, and many others. This has allowed global audiences to understand the comments made by Kizuna in her videos, and has helped to grow her audience outside of Japan. Korean and English comments take up similar portions in the comments section of Kizuna's videos.

== Impact ==
Kizuna, also known, "AI-chan" among her fans, is the spearhead of the virtual YouTuber trend. Kevin Allocca, YouTube's head of cultural trends, singled out the meteoric growth of A.I. Channel over 10 months as an example of the growth of virtual personalities on the platform. Allocca also noted that the trend's popularity was mostly contained to Japan. Character designs such as Kizuna are seen as a revolutionary concept, and could be the precursor of a new trend in virtual reality, virtual YouTube users and live-streamers.

2D virtual characters such as Hatsune Miku have gradually become more popular, and the audience of 2D has been widening. Therefore, the concept of Kizuna as a YouTube video host is becoming more widespread. The profession of live-streaming usually requests for the constant production of original or exclusive content for the audience, and 2D live-streaming can be a method of doing so. Also, in the regular YouTube market, virtual streaming can be an alternative for those who are unable or do not wish to reveal their face in front of the camera, because exquisite character designs can make up for the imperfections in real people. Virtual streaming also allows the production crew to create more than one character. For example, Black AI is another artificial intelligence who appears several times in Kizuna's videos, and seems to be animated in the same fashion.

Tubefilter writer Sam Gutelle states that even though characters like Kizuna may be seen as oddities now, they will become more common in the future. The Verge columnist Rich McCormick feels that Kizuna is different from other content creators as she can technically play games as long as she wants without the need for food and sleep. This will bring channels more flexibility, and these types of videos may even be the future of YouTube. The BBC thinks that the selling point of virtual characters is that they are not like other YouTubers, as their appearance will never age and related development is still in its beginning stages.

In 2018, Kizuna appeared on a program on NHK interviewing the Japanese Nobel Prize winners, which sparked debate on social media over female objectification, with several scholars deeming her appearance as inappropriate. Yuki Senda, a professor at Musashi University, claimed that Kizuna nodding along with the panel instead of contributing constructively to the conversation was more of an issue than her character design, due to her mannerisms reinforcing gender roles in women. Junko Saeki, a professor at Doshisha University, also suggested that Kizuna's quietness may be perpetuating a new wave of orientalism because of her role as one of Japan's primary cultural exports.

In a review of the first episode of the anime adaption, Chiaki Hirai of Anime Feminist said that Kizuna AI and her backers "know she's got her brand and that's what people are there for".

=== Fandom activities ===
On 25 December 2016, Kizuna's producers decided to put up her MikuMikuDance 3D model for free download and edits on her official site. This was to allow interested fans to produce doujin products. The 3D model can be used in MikuMikuDance, Unity, Unreal Engine and other spaces. The developers also made the model compatible with virtual reality. The virtual model is allowed use in videos and games, but for business purposes it is required that the developers are contacted. Finally, the use of the model in political, racial or religious settings or to create other models is prohibited.

The derivative work of some fans is shared to the rest of the fanbase on Kizuna's social media accounts. On YouTube, there are many users who name their accounts "Kizuna AI", "キズナアイ" or other related names. Some repost her videos but only the official "A.I.Channel" offers subtitles for many languages. There are also dancing-related videos.
