= Sangatsu no Phantasia =

Japanese music unit

Sangatsu no Phantasia 三月のパンタシア
- Genres: Anison
- Years active: 2015–present
- Labels: Kioon Music (2016–2017); Sacra Music (2017–present)
- Members: Mia (vocals)
- Website: www.phantasia.jp

Sangatsu no Phantasia (三月のパンタシア, Sangatsu no Pantashia) is a Japanese music unit which is signed to Sacra Music. It consists of vocalist Mia, whose music videos and promotional images are illustrated by various artists. The unit began activities in 2015 when it uploaded its first song "Day Break" on YouTube, before making its major debut in 2016. Their music has been featured in anime television series such as Kiznaiver, Interviews with Monster Girls, Re:Creators, Slow Start, and The Honor Student at Magic High School. In addition to producing music, Mia also writes novels, with some of the unit's songs being based on her novels.

== History ==
The unit began its activities in 2015 when vocalist Mia uploaded a song titled "Day Break" on YouTube. The song was produced by the internet musician Scop, and quickly gained attention. During this time, their videos and songs featured illustrations by artist Natsu Asami.

In 2016, the unit made its major debut with the release of the single "Hajimari no Sokudo" (はじまりの速度), the title track of which was used as the ending theme to the anime television series Kiznaiver. Their second single "Gunjō Sekai" (群青世界) was released in December of the same year. Their third single "Fairy Tail" (フェアリーテイル) was released in February 2017; the title track was used as the ending theme to the anime television series Interviews with Monster Girls. Their first album Ano Toki no Uta ga Kikoeru (あのときの歌が聴こえる) was released on March 8, 2017.

The unit's fourth single, "Rubicon" (ルビコン), was released on August 30, 2017; the title track was used as an ending theme to the anime television series Re:Creators. Their fifth single, "Kaze no Koe o Kikinagara/Collage" (風の声を聴きながら/コラージュ) was released on March 7, 2018; "Kaze no Koe o Kikinagara" was used as the ending theme to the anime television series Slow Start. Their sixth single "Pink Lemonade" (ピンクレモネード) was released on November 21, 2018; the title track was used as the opening theme to the anime television series As Miss Beelzebub Likes. Their second album, Girl's Blue, Happy Sad (ガールズブルー・ハッピーサッド) was released on November 21, 2018.

The unit released its third album Blue Pop wa Nari Yamanai (ブルーポップは鳴りやまない) on September 30, 2020. They released their seventh single "101/Yakō" (101/夜光) on July 21, 2021; "101" was used as the opening theme to the anime television series The Honor Student at Magic High School.

In addition to producing music, the unit also writes novels. Some of their songs, such as "Hoshi no Namida" (星の涙), have received novelizations. In 2018, vocalist Mia began writing novels; since then, some of the unit's songs have been based on her novels.

== Discography ==
=== Albums ===
- Ano Toki no Uta ga Kikoeru (あのときの歌が聴こえる) (Release date: March 8, 2018)
- Girl's Blue, Happy Sad (ガールズブルー・ハッピーサッド) (Release date: November 21, 2018)
- Blue Pop wa Nari Yamanai (ブルーポップは鳴りやまない) (Release date: September 30, 2020)
- Kaikou Shoujo (邂逅少女) (Release date: March 9, 2022)
- Ai no Fukashigi (愛の不可思議) (Release date: August 21, 2024)
- Tasai Tomei na Blue Datta (多彩透明なブルーだった) (Release date: August 20, 2025)

=== Singles ===
- "Hajimari no Sokudo" (はじまりの速度) (Release date: June 1, 2016)
- "Gunjō Sekai" (群青世界) (Release date: December 14, 2016)
- "Fairy Tail" (フェアリーテイル) (Release date: February 1, 2017)
- "Rubicon" (ルビコン) (Release date: August 30, 2017)
- "Kaze no Koe o Kikinagara/Collage" (風の声を聴きながら/コラージュ) (Release date: March 7, 2018)
- "101/Yakō" (101/夜光) (Release date: July 21, 2021)
