= Kizuna no Allele =

Japanese anime television series

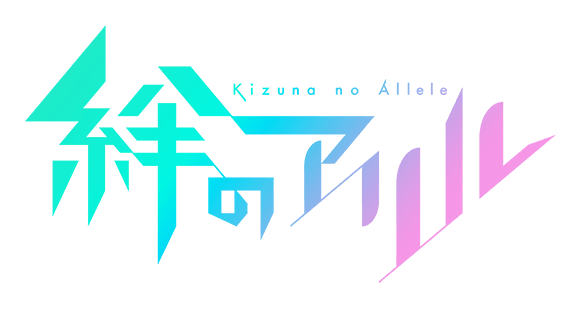

絆のアリル (Kizuna no Ariru)
- Anime television series
- Directed by: Kenichiro Komaya
- Written by: Deko Akao
- Music by: Go Sakabe
- Studio: Wit Studio; Signal.MD
- Licensed by: Crunchyroll
- Original network: TXN (TV Tokyo)
- Original run: 4 April 2023 – 21 December 2023
- Episodes: 24
- icon

Kizuna no Allele (Japanese: 絆のアリル, Hepburn: Kizuna no Ariru) is a Japanese anime television series from Wit Studio and Signal.MD, based on the VTuber Kizuna AI. It is directed by Kenichiro Komaya, written by Deko Akao, and features character designs by Shiori Asaka and Niina Morita, and music composed by Go Sakabe. The first season aired from April to June 2023, and the second season aired from October to December 2023.

== Cast and characters ==
=== PathTLive ===
- Miracle (ミラク, Miraku) (Voiced by: Ayumi Hinohara)
- Chris (クリス, Kurisu) (Voiced by: Hikari Kodama)
- Noelle (ノエル, Noeru) (Voiced by: Yuka Nukui)
- Riz (リズ, Rizu) (Voiced by: Arisa Hanawa)
- Quan (クオン, Kuon)/marumaru (Voiced by: Rina Kawaguchi)
- Kizuna Ai (Voiced by: Herself)

=== BRT5 ===
- Niska (ニスカ, Nisuka) (Voiced by: Yūri Matsuoka)
- Jessie (ジェシー, Jeshī) (Voiced by: Randhi)
- Ellie (エリー, Erī) (Voiced by: Haruka Yoshiki)
- Sarah (サラ, Sara) (Voiced by: Hina Natsume)
- Halle (ハル, Haru) (Voiced by: Hinaki Yano)

=== VICONIC ===
- Jua (ジュア, Jua) (Voiced by: Nozomi Nagumo)
- Thea (セア, Sea) (Voiced by: Tsukino)

=== 3DM8 ===
- Ximena (ヒメナ, Himena) (Voiced by: Ruri Arai)
- Zoe (ゾーイ, Zōi) (Voiced by: Nao Furuhata)
- Sofia (ソフィア, Sofia) (Voiced by: Yūna Kitahara)

== Production ==
In February 2022, Kizuna AI announced at her "Hello, World 2022" concert that an anime project was in production. Prior to the announcement, Kizuna Ai had already voiced cameo roles in two other anime television series, Ingress and Magical Girl Site. In November 2022, the anime project was confirmed to be a television series titled Kizuna no Allele, set to air in 2023, with a visual from En Morikura, Kizuna AI's character designer. Later that same month, the anime's plot and key visual were unveiled. In December 2022, the cast and staff of the series was unveiled, as well as another key visual. In February 2023, it was announced that the series would premiere on TV Tokyo and its affiliates, which aired from 4 April to 20 June 2023.

The series is produced by Wit Studio and Signal.MD and directed by Kenichiro Komaya, with Deko Akao writing the scripts, Shiori Asaka and Niina Morita designing the characters and serving as chief animation directors alongside Mizuki Takahashi, and Go Sakabe composing the music. Crunchyroll streamed the series in North America, Oceania, and selected European territories.

In June 2023, it was announced that the series would have a second season, which aired from 5 October to 21 December 2023.

== Episodes ==
=== Season 1 ===
No. overall	No. in season	Title	Directed by (Note: Information is taken from the ending credits of each episode.)	Written by	Storyboard by	Original release date
1	1	"Another Euphoria"; Transliteration: "~Mōhitotsu no Yūforia~" (Japanese: 〜もう一つのユーフォリア〜)	Fumihiro Matsui	Deko Akao	Ken'ichirō Komaya and Takahiro Kawanami	4 April 2023
2	2	"Encounter Attraction"; Transliteration: "~Deai no Inryoku~" (Japanese: 〜出会いの引力〜)	Hong Penny	Deko Akao	Ho Pyeon-gang	11 April 2023
3	3	"First Step Towards the Stage"; Transliteration: "~Sutēji e no Daiippo~" (Japanese: 〜ステージへの第一歩〜)	Ichio Kunimoto	Rie Kojika	Ken'ichirō Komaya and Takahiro Kawanami	18 April 2023
4	4	"Andante of Confusion"; Transliteration: "~Konmei no Andante~" (Japanese: 〜混迷のアンダンテ〜)	Kyōko Yamazaki	Gigaemon Ichikawa	Kyōko Yamazaki	25 April 2023
5	5	"The Color of a Word"; Transliteration: "~Kotoba no Iro~" (Japanese: 〜言葉の色〜)	Fumihiro Matsui	Yukari Matsumura	Satomi Nakamura	2 May 2023
6	6	"The Reason for Perfection"; Transliteration: "~Kanpeki no Riyū~" (Japanese: 〜完璧の理由〜)	Hong Penny	Tomomi Kawaguchi	Hong Penny	9 May 2023
7	7	"Battlefield of Conflict"; Transliteration: "~Kattō no Batorufīrudo~" (Japanese: 〜葛藤のバトルフィールド〜)	Kentarō Tanaka	Gigaemon Ichikawa	Takashi Tsuge	16 May 2023
8	8	"Teatime of Anguish"; Transliteration: "~Urei no Tītaimu~" (Japanese: 〜憂いのティータイム〜)	Mitsutoshi Satō	Rie Kojika	Takashi Kawabata	23 May 2023
9	9	"Unpredictable Ultimate"; Transliteration: "~Yosoku Funō no Arutimetto~" (Japanese: 〜予測不能のアルティメット〜)	Shigeru Ueda	Deko Akao	Ken'ichirō Komaya and Takahiro Kawanami	30 May 2023
10	10	"What It Means to Be Me"; Transliteration: "~Watashirashiku no Imi~" (Japanese: 〜私らしくの意味〜)	Shigeki Awai	Yukari Matsumura	Sao Namiki	6 June 2023
11	11	"True Color"; Transliteration: "~Turū Karā~" (Japanese: 〜True color〜)	Kentarō Tanaka	Tomomi Kawaguchi	Ken'ichirō Komaya and Takahiro Kawanami	13 June 2023
12	12	"Stage of Fate"; Transliteration: "~Unmei no Sutēji~" (Japanese: 〜運命のステージ〜)	Kyōko Yamazaki	Gigaemon Ichikawa	Kyōko Yamazaki	20 June 2023

=== Season 2 ===
No. overall	No. in season	Title	Directed by	Written by	Storyboard by	Original release date
13	1	"～Prelude to Harsh Battle～"; Transliteration: "～Gekisen no Pureryūdo～" (Japanese: ～激戦のプレリュード～)	Fumihiro Matsui, Kazuya Mihashi	Gigaemon Ichikawa	Takashi Tsuge	5 October 2023
14	2	"～Departure of Resolution～"; Transliteration: "～Ketsui no Fdepāchā～" (Japanese: ～決意のデパーチャー～)	Ryutaro Awabe	Minako Kawabe	Hong Penny	12 October 2023
15	3	"～A Seil Just For Me～"; Transliteration: "～Watashi Dake no Zairu～" (Japanese: ～わたしだけのザイル～)	Kazuho Sonomoto	Chiaki Nishinaka	Daisuke Shimamura	19 October 2023
16	4	"～Answer～"; Transliteration: "～Answer～" (Japanese: ～Answer～)	Hina Nakahata	Tomomi Kawaguchi	Atsushi Otsuki	26 October 2023
17	5	"～One-Sided Rivalry～"; Transliteration: "～Kataomoi no Raibaru～" (Japanese: ～片思いのライバル～)	Kentaro Tanaka	Yukari Matsumura	Atsushi Otsuki	2 November 2023
18	6	"～New Feelings～"; Transliteration: "～Hajimete no Kanjō～" (Japanese: ～初めての感情～)	Hong Penny	Rie Kojika	Hong Penny	9 November 2023
19	7	"～Everyone's Solitude～"; Transliteration: "～Sorezore no Sorichūdo～" (Japanese: ～それぞれのソリチュード～)	Fumihiro Matsui and Kazuya Mibashi	Gigaemon Ichikawa	Daisuke Shimamura	16 November 2023
20	8	"～Where Flapping Wings Fly～"; Transliteration: "～Habataki no Yukue～" (Japanese: ～羽ばたきの行方～)	Hina Nakahata	Deko Akao	Moe Kato	23 November 2023
21	9	"～Shoes of Friendship～"; Transliteration: "～Yūjō no Shūzu～" (Japanese: ～友情のシューズ～)	Kentaro Tanaka	Chiaki Nishinaka	Takashi Tsuge	30 November 2023
22	10	"～We, the Unknown～"; Transliteration: "～Michisū no Watashitachi～" (Japanese: ～未知数の私たち～)	Ryutaro Awabe	Minako Kawabe	Ryutaro Awabe	7 December 2023
23	11	"～Time Limit of Despair～"; Transliteration: "～Zetsubō no Ttaimurimitto～" (Japanese: ～絶望のタイムリミット～)	Ken'ichiro Komaya	Gigaemon Ichikawa	Satomi Nakamura and Takashi Tsuge	14 December 2023
24	12	"～Connection of Hope～"; Transliteration: "～Kibō no Konekushon～" (Japanese: ～希望のコネクション～)	Kyōko Yamazaki	Deko Akao	Kyōko Yamazaki	21 December 2023

== Reception ==
For the most part, critics had a negative reaction to the series. Steve Jones and Nicholas Dupree of Anime News Network were critical, wondering why the anime was created, calling it a "strange duck" with questionable creative choices, called the musical numbers subpar, said that it was not "technically an idol anime," criticized the "mythologizing and near-deification" of Kizuna Ai, said the finished product of the anime looked like it had "been handled by boardrooms full of ill-fitting suits" or extolling the "virtues of AI art." In another article on the same site, Jones described the series as "one of the most nakedly cynical and corporation-poisoned anime projects" he had ever seen, even as a fan of VTubers, and suggested people "stay away from this slop." ANN's Spring 2023 anime preview guide was similarly critical. Reviewer Richard Eisenbeis said he was not interested in the series, and the depiction of a world where "live-streaming and idol culture collide" was not enough to offset the other issues of the series and James Beckett said he would be "happy to remain ignorant and devote my time this season to searching for greener, less uncanny pastures" rather than watching the series. Dupree had similar thoughts but said the series looked "fine" and there was a "certain charm to the 3D segments." Rebecca Silverman described the series as better than Alice Gear Aegis Expansion and appreciated the choreography of Miracle, but called the series "plainly a showcase for virtual idols."

Anime Feminist was also critical, calling it a "dull, calculated cash-in" which did not capture VTuber culture, passed on the series after it "started shilling" for NFTs in a segment following episode 3, and questioned if it is a "forced meme or not." Reviewer Chiaki Hirai, examining the show's first episode, criticized Miracle's character and stated that while the show had "nothing problematic" at that point, it was, for her, an embodiment of everything she found "tiresome about the artificiality of pop entertainment in Japan," and recommended people watch My Love Story with Yamada-kun at Lv999 instead.

Claire of Beneath the Tangles argued that the plot of the first episode is incoherent, has static characters and an empty world, is less compelling than Selection Project, and they were passing on the series. Comingsoon.net said that the second season promised to have an "engaging storyline enriched with...depth and intrigue."

== See also ==
- holoX MEETing!, a manga series based on the VTuber group HoloX
