= List of The Honor Student at Magic High School episodes =

Key visual

The Honor Student at Magic High School is a 2021 Japanese anime series of the spin-off manga series of the same name written by Yu Mori and a spin off of The Irregular at Magic High School. After the end of The Irregular at Magic High School, it was revealed that the spin-off manga series, The Honor Student at Magic High School would get an anime television series adaptation, which aired from July 3 to September 25, 2021, on Tokyo MX and other channels. The series is animated by Connect and directed by Hideki Tachibana, with Tsuyoshi Tamai writing and overseeing the series' scripts, Ryōsuke Yamamoto and Takao Sano designing the characters, and Taku Iwasaki returning to compose the series' music. The opening theme is "101" performed by Sangatsu no Phantasia while the ending theme is "Double Standard" performed by The Dance for Philosophy.

== Episodes ==
No.	Title	Directed by	Written by	Storyboarded by	Original release date
1	"I'll Cherish This for the Rest of My Life"; Transliteration: "Isshō Daijini Shimasu" (Japanese: 一生大事にします)	Yoshinobu Tokumoto	Tsuyoshi☆Tamai	Hideki Tachibana	July 3, 2021
On her birthday, Miyuki Shiba is brought on a date by her older brother Tatsuya. Maya Yotsuba, the head of the Yotsuba family, suddenly summons Tatsuya through their head butler Tadanori Hayama to deal with a rogue magician with a reinforced heat aptitude who intends to attack the mall where Miyuki is waiting, close to the Kanto branch of the Magic Association. The magician begins to commit arson in the mall, but he is stopped and defeated by Miyuki. The incident catches the attention of the First High School's student council president Mayumi Saegusa, who identifies Miyuki as their student, and the school's Public Morals Committee head Mari Watanabe, and they decide to recruit her.
2	"May I Join You?"; Transliteration: "Go Issho Shite mo Ii Desu ka?" (Japanese: ご一緒してもいいですか？)	Takashi Watanabe	Tsuyoshi☆Tamai	Takashi Watanabe	July 10, 2021
Honoka Mitsui manages to befriend Miyuki, who has caught her attention since the entrance examination. Honoka learns that Tatsuya, whose magic during the same exam has mesmerized her, is Miyuki's older brother and a Course 2 student, believing that he is a Course 1 student like them. After school, a commotion takes place between Tatsuya and Shun Morisaki's groups due to Miyuki hanging out with her brother and his fellow Course 2 classmates. Honoka attempts to stop the brewing fight, but her magic is stopped by Mayumi accompanied by Mari. As she is about to get questioned for using an attack spell, Honoka is defended by Tatsuya, who reveals that she has only cast a harmless flash spell. Honoka and her friend Shizuku Kitayama later learn that Miyuki has joined the student council and her brother has been recruited to the Public Morals Committee, but they become upset after hearing negative responses toward Tatsuya. Despite the discrimination between Course 1 and Course 2 students, Honoka still leads in making Miyuki join Tatsuya's group during lunch.
3	"The Girl's Detective Club Is Here!"; Transliteration: "Shōjo Tantei-dan, Shidō yo!" (Japanese: 少女探偵団、始動よ！)	Yoshinobu Kasai	Tsuyoshi☆Tamai	Hideki Tachibana	July 17, 2021
Honoka and Shizuku are swarmed by club members trying to recruit them during the school's recruitment week, but they are saved by Eimi Akechi riding a horse. Afterward, the trio senses a psionic wave coming from the dojo. They learn that Tatsuya has de-escalated the tension between the kendo and kenjutsu clubs inside the dojo. As they sneak past the club recruiters, Honoka, Shizuku, and Eimi witness Tatsuya attempting to stop a fight between students when an unknown figure fires an Air Bullet magic spell toward him, but Tatsuya evades it. The trio decides to secretly investigate the assailant, forming under the name "Girl's Detective Club", and observe Tatsuya dealing with another incident targeting him. Later at night, Tatsuya reveals to Miyuki that Honoka, Shizuku, and Eimi have been watching him. The following day, the Girl's Detective Club learns that kendo team captain Kinoe Tsukasa is behind the incident involving Tatsuya.
4	"Friends"; Transliteration: "Tomodachi" (Japanese: 友達)	Shigeki Awai	Tsuyoshi☆Tamai	Yūichi Abe	July 24, 2021
During lunch with Miyuki, Mayumi, Mari, and student council secretary Azusa Nakajō, Tatsuya reveals what has transpired between his meeting with Sayaka Mibu, whom he saved during the incident in the dojo, regarding discrimination against Course 2 students. He concludes that an organization called Blanche is behind Sayaka's delusional belief. The organization's infiltration into the school has made Miyuki worried, but Tatsuya reassures her that he is going to deal with them before the Yotsuba family makes a move. The following day, the Girl's Detective Club follows Kinoe, only to be led into a trap and attacked by his colleague from Blanche. Miyuki saves Honoka, Shizuku, and Eimi, and is glad that they are her friends for trying to catch Tatsuya's attacker from the previous day for her brother's sake. With Kokonoe Yakumo's intel about Kinoe and his relationship with Blanche's branch leader Hajime as his stepbrother, Miyuki and Tatsuya learn that the organization might cause a disturbance during the open forum between the student council and the coalition of students that are against discrimination.
5	"I Won't Let Anyone Interfere"; Transliteration: "Tedashi wa Sasemasen" (Japanese: 手出しはさせません)	Yūsuke Tomita	Tsuyoshi☆Tamai	Takashi Watanabe	July 31, 2021
Blanche attacks the First High School, during which Honoka, Shizuku, and Eimi encounter several of its members and defeat them. Miyuki and Tatsuya see the trio apprehending them and advise them to follow the student council's evacuation order. Honoka, Shizuku, and Eimi notice Kinoe being accompanied by Blanche members and follow them. The trio defeats the Blanche members, except for Kinoe since he has escaped them, but he is later apprehended by members of the Public Morals Committee. Following the attack, Miyuki and Tatsuya decide to infiltrate Blanche's hideout. With Katsuto Jūmonji, Takeaki Kirihara, Erika Chiba, and Leonhard Saijō joining them, Miyuki and Tatsuya defeat the organization. Miyuki feels guilty for going overboard on using her Niflheim magic against the enemies, resulting in Tatsuya using his Regeneration ability to heal them, but she is comforted by her brother. Miyuki and Tatsuya's friends then celebrate his birthday. In a post-credits scene, students Airi Isshiki, Tōko Tsukushīn, and Shiori Kanō of the Third High School begin their training for the upcoming Nine Schools Competition.
6	"The Nine Schools Competition Begins"; Transliteration: "Kyūkōsen, Kaimaku Desu" (Japanese: 九校戦、開幕です)	Jun'ya Koshiba	Tsuyoshi☆Tamai	Kazuhisa Takenouchi	August 7, 2021
Miyuki, Honoka, and Shizuku are among the students selected to compete in the Nine Schools Competition due to their top scores from their first-semester exams. Tatsuya has been selected to join the engineering staff for the competitors. During the social gathering event for participants from nine National Magic University-affiliated high schools, Miyuki, Honoka, and Shizuku are greeted by Airi, Tōko, and Shiori. On the day of the competition, Mayumi and Mari respectively win their matches for the Official Speed Shooting and Battle Board events. During another match for the Battle Board event, Mari and a competitor of Seventh High School are involved in an accident, resulting in Saho Mizuo of Third High School winning and Mari forfeiting from competing to recover. Due to the incident, Miyuki is chosen by Mayumi as Mari's replacement for the Official Mirage Bat event instead of its rookie event.
7	"Arithmetic Chain"; Transliteration: "Arisumatikku Chein" (Japanese: 数学的連鎖(アリスマティック・チェイン))	Yoshinobu Kasai	Tsuyoshi☆Tamai	Yūichi Abe	August 14, 2021
Shizuku and Shiori win their matches for the Rookie Speed Shooting event, leading to them facing off in the semi-finals. Despite Shiori's Arithmetic Chain magic sequence, which helps her in calculating faster than a supercomputer, Shizuku wins the match due to her generalized CAD (Casting Assistant Device) with auxiliary sight crafted by Tatsuya. Shizuku's Active Air Mine spell used during the said match is then registered by Tatsuya with National Magic University's database under her name instead of his despite being the developer. For the Rookie Battle Board event, Honoka wins the match by using a light magic spell developed by Tatsuya for her. Meanwhile, Shiori, still feeling depressed about losing the match, is comforted by Mizuo, telling her that Airi is not going to abandon her since she is happy to find a friendly rival through her. This motivates Shiori to rejoin Airi the following morning.
8	"Hell of Ice and Flames"; Transliteration: "Inferuno" (Japanese: 氷熱地獄(インフェルノ))	Shigeki Awai	Tsuyoshi☆Tamai	Yūichi Nihei	August 21, 2021
Nanami Kasuga and Subaru Satomi of First High School both lose their match against Airi in the Rookie Crowd Ball event due to their opponent's superhuman reaction. For the Rookie Ice Pillars Break event, Shiori and Eimi, with Tatsuya's developed spell for her, win their matches, leading to them facing off soon in another match. Miyuki is next to compete in the Ice Pillars Break match, demonstrating her Inferno spell to defeat her opponent. Following the dinner later that evening, Miyuki and her friends encounter Airi's group, with Airi recognizing Miyuki's strength.
9	"Because You Were by My Side"; Transliteration: "Anata ga Ita Kara" (Japanese: あなたがいたから)	Kōki Onoue	Tsuyoshi☆Tamai	Royden B	August 28, 2021
During the Ice Pillars Break match, Eimi struggles to destroy Shiori's fortified ice pillars. She eventually wins the match by hurling one of her remaining pillars, applying enough force to break Shiori's remaining fortified pillars, at the cost of her exhaustion. The Rookie Ice Pillars Break event concludes with the top three spots going to Miyuki, Shizuku, and Eimi. Eimi decides to decline Mayumi's offer to take first place with the other two, but Shizuku wants to challenge Miyuki, taking this as an opportunity to compete against a high-caliber magician like her. For the final match of the Rookie Battle Board event, Honoka manages to win against Tōko by applying the plan and training that Tatsuya has devised for her.
10	"I Don't Want to Lose"; Transliteration: "Maketakunai" (Japanese: 負けたくない)	Yūsuke Tomita	Tsuyoshi☆Tamai	Takashi Watanabe	September 4, 2021
During the final match of the Rookie Ice Pillar Break event between her and Miyuki, Shizuku pulls out a second CAD while currently using another one, shocking everyone in attendance since it is impossible to use two CADs at the same time. She then casts the Phonon Maser magic that she has learned from Tatsuya in an attempt to destroy Miyuki's pillars. At the end of the match, Miyuki wins against Shizuku after unleashing her Niflheim magic. Despite feeling bitter about her loss, Shizuku is in good condition to join Miyuki and Tatsuya while they are eating sweets. For the Rookie Mirage Bat event, Subaru and Honoka win the match with Tatsuya as their engineer. Afterward, an accident occurs during the Rookie Monolith Code event involving Morisaki's team.
11	"Brother, Good Luck"; Transliteration: "Onii-sama, Gobuun o" (Japanese: お兄様、ご武運を)	Masato Uchibori	Tsuyoshi☆Tamai	Yūichi Nihei	September 11, 2021
Tatsuya continues to support Honoka and Subaru for their Mirage Bat match, leading them to take the first and second spots in the final match. Later, Miyuki's friends learn that Tatsuya has been selected to participate in the Monolith Code match in place of Morisaki's team. Meanwhile, Miyuki learns from Tatsuya about the organization No Head Dragon's involvement in the sabotages against First High School to prevent them from winning. Honoka, Shizuku, Eimi, and others propose to Miyuki that they are going to secretly protect Tatsuya against saboteurs as their way of repaying for the help he provided to them in their previous matches. They begin to monitor the arenas that are going to be used for the Monolith Code match. Tōko, who is with Airi and Shiori upon encountering Honoka and Shizuku, senses restless spirits in the ley lines, realizing that it is a deliberate act to aid Third High School in winning the match against First High School. Airi and her friends offer their help in apprehending the agents of No Head Dragon present in an arena, while Miyuki, with Honoka and Shizuku's assistance, freezes the ley lines. After the issue has been dealt with, Miyuki and her friends return to watch the match between Masaki Ichijō and Tatsuya's teams.
12	"I Will Fly!"; Transliteration: "Tobimasu!" (Japanese: 飛びます！)	Tatsuya Yoshida	Tsuyoshi☆Tamai	Royden B Hideki Tachibana	September 18, 2021
On the first match of the Official Mirage Bat event, Keiko Kobayakawa of First High School falls from the sky after her CAD failed to function, but she is saved by the tournament staff. Tatsuya deduces that the incident is one of sabotages against their school. He later restrains one of the staff members for corrupting Miyuki's CAD. A rumor about Tatsuya going violent is spread among other schools until Mayumi teases him for doing this for his sister's sake, resulting in other schools seeing the incident as him being a "siscon". During the second match for the Official Mirage Bat event, Miyuki uses the flying magic device developed by Tatsuya to win. After the match, she overhears her brother having a conversation with tournament officials regarding his flying magic device. Meanwhile, No Dragon Head decides to attempt to shut down the competition by sending their Generator agent, only to be thwarted by members of the National Defense Force. On the final match of the Official Mirage Bat event, Airi learns that the other schools plan to use the flying magic device after its information has been leaked by the tournament officials.
13	"I Can't Lose"; Transliteration: "Yuzurenai Omoi" (Japanese: ゆずれない想い)	Yoshinobu Tokumoto; Takashi Watanabe	Tsuyoshi☆Tamai	Hideki Tachibana	September 25, 2021
On the final match of the Official Mirage Bat event, Miyuki's competitors begin to use flying magic, but she still dominates the match. Airi decides to combine her Jump Spell and the flying magic, resulting in an intense fight between her and Miyuki. Miyuki emerges victorious after the match. As Miyuki and Airi's friends bond together while taking a bath, Tatsuya heads to the No Head Dragon to destroy them. During the after-party, Mayumi reveals to Azusa the real reason behind the difference between Course 1 and 2 students. Afterward, Tatsuya is offered by Katsuto Jūmonji to join the Ten Master Clans by engaging in a political marriage. As the party draws to a close, Miyuki and Tatsuya share their final dance. In a post-credits scene, Shizuku is in the United States for a three-month student exchange program. Miyuki's friends then meet the foreign exchange student.

== See also ==
- List of The Irregular at Magic High School episodes
