= IG Port =

Japanese stock holder for entertainment media

IG Port, Inc.

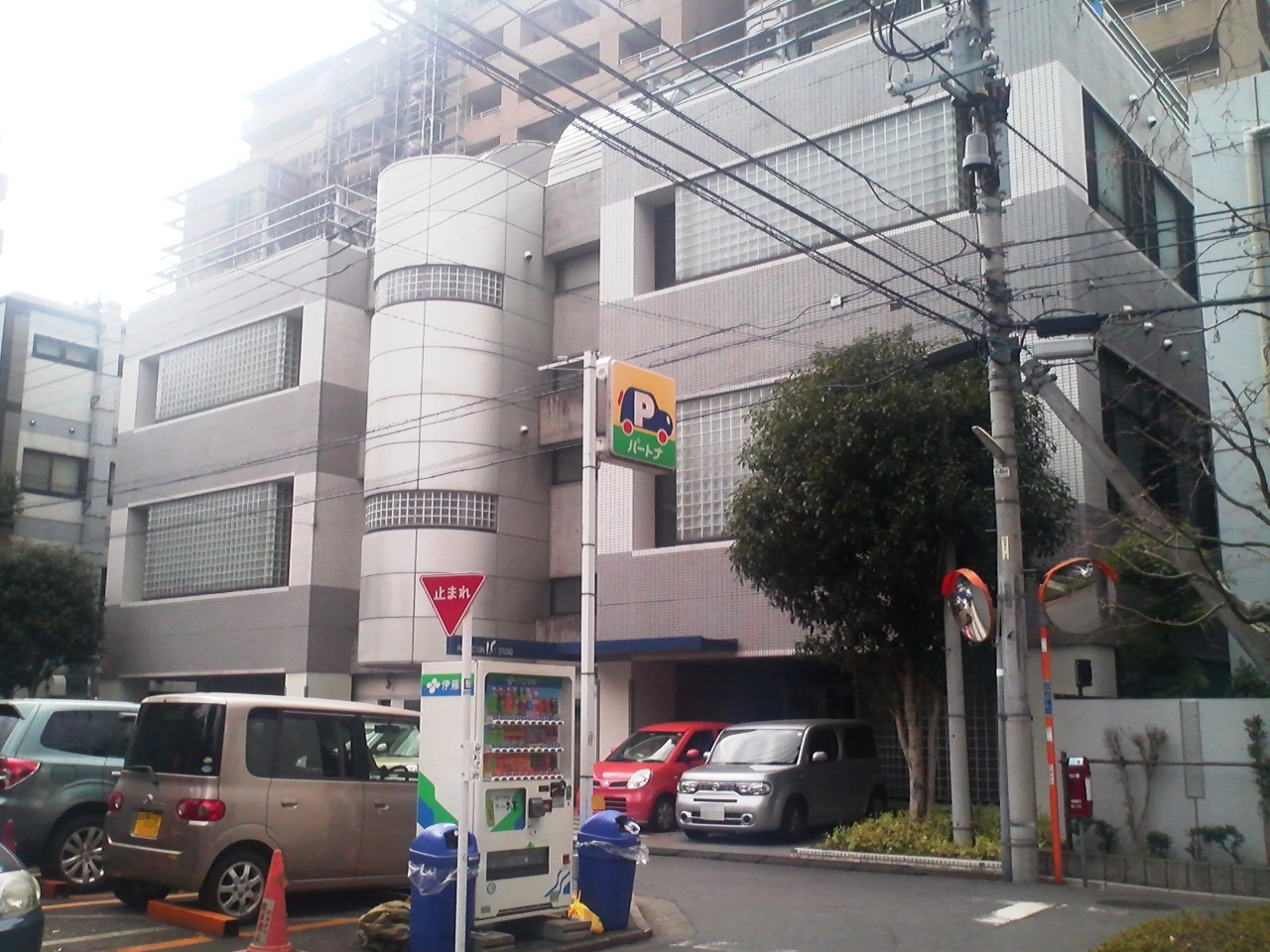
- Headquarters in Musashino, Tokyo
- Native name: 株式会社IGポート
- Romanized name: Kabushiki gaisha Ai Jī Pōto
- Formerly: ING Co., Ltd (1990–2000); Production I.G, Inc. (2000–2007)
- Type: Public
- Traded as: TYO: 3791
- Industry: Anime, Film, Television, video games
- Founded: May 6, 1990; 36 years ago (as ING)
- Founder: Mitsuhisa Ishikawa; Takayuki Goto
- Headquarters: Kichjoji, Musashino, Tokyo, Japan
- Key people: Mitsuhisa Ishikawa (founder/director/president and CEO); Takayuki Goto (founder, Character Designer); Hiroyuki Nakano (Executive Officer); Mikio Gunji (Executive Officer)
- Products: Anime, Film, Television, OVA, Video games, Manga
- Revenue: ¥11,841,359,000 (2024)
- Operating income: ¥1,225,736,000 (2024)
- Net income: ¥1,131,835,000 (2024)
- Owner: Mitsuhisa Ishikawa (18.9%); Dentsu Group (9.9%); Nippon Television Network (9.9%); Sanrio (5.0%)
- Number of employees: 600 (Consolidated, as of May 31, 2024)
- Subsidiaries: Production I.G; Wit Studio; Mag Garden
- Website: www.igport.co.jp

IG Port, Inc. (Japanese: 株式会社IGポート, Hepburn: Kabushiki-gaisha Ai Jī Pōto) is a Japanese holding company that was established on December 1, 2007, as a result of a merger between the Japanese anime studio Production I.G and manga publisher Mag Garden.

== History ==
The merger between Production I.G and Mag Garden was announced on July 4, 2007. Production I.G was transformed into a holding company a month ahead of the scheduled merger on December 1, 2007. Along with a name change, it transferred most of its former duties and management to a newly developed subsidiary also named "Production I.G". After the merger with Mag Garden by the stock exchange, IG Port now fully owned the "new" Production I.G, Mag Garden, and Xebec as its subsidiaries.

On September 19, 2014, IG Port announced that it would be forming a new animation production subsidiary, named Signal.MD, with a capital of ¥30 million. The company stated that the goal of the new subsidiary would be to "develop technology for full digital animation and smart devices" and "build the foundation for the production of animation aimed at children and families". It was established in October 2014, with Katsuji Morishita of Production I.G serving as its president.

On November 20, 2018, IG Port announced that the production operations of Xebec would be transferred to Sunrise, citing that the studio's primary business (production for animation and other on-screen works) "has been running a deficit for a long time" and its revenue from licensing business "has not made up for the shortfall." The company finalized the transfer of the studio, with its cost amounting ¥300 million, on April 1, 2019.

IG Port earned more than ¥10 billion in revenue for the first time in a single fiscal year when the company reported ¥11.872 billion in revenue on July 14, 2022, for the fiscal year starting in June 2021 and ending in May 2022. The company's profit decreased by 99% to ¥5 million, which was attributed to "unifying its income from streaming projects and licensing sales with its amortization expenses". The company stated that the decrease in net income should return to normal in the upcoming fiscal year.

On June 17, 2025, IG Port entered into a capital and business alliance with Sanrio, became its fourth biggest shareholder on July 3 of that year.
