= Shinkansen Henkei Robo Shinkalion =

Japanese toy franchise by Takara Tomy

- Cover of the first Blu-ray volume

新幹線変形ロボ シンカリオン (Shinkansen Henkei Robo Shinkarion)
- Genre: Mecha, science fiction
- Anime television series

Shinkansen Henkei Robo Shinkalion THE ANIMATION
- Directed by: Takahiro Ikezoe
- Written by: Kento Shimoyama
- Music by: Toshiyuki Watanabe
- Studio: OLM
- Original network: JNN (TBS)
- Original run: January 6, 2018 – June 29, 2019
- Episodes: 76
- Video game

Shinkansen Henkei Robo Shinkalion: Get the Card! Ultra Evolution Battle
- Developer: T-ARTS
- Publisher: T-ARTS
- Genre: Action
- Platform: Arcade
- Released: JP: March 2018
- Anime film

Shinkansen Henkei Robo Shinkalion the Movie: The Marvelous Fast ALFA-X That Comes From the Future
- Directed by: Takahiro Ikezoe
- Written by: Kento Shimoyama
- Music by: Toshiyuki Watanabe
- Studio: OLM
- Released: December 27, 2019
- Runtime: 79 minutes
- Anime television series

Shinkansen Henkei Robo Shinkalion Z
- Directed by: Takahiro Ikezoe (Chief); Kentaro Yamaguchi
- Written by: Takahiro Ikezoe; Masanao Akahoshi
- Music by: Norihito Sumitomo
- Studio: OLM Team Abe
- Original network: TXN (TV Tokyo)
- Original run: April 9, 2021 – March 18, 2022
- Episodes: 41
- Manga

Shinkalion: Dive the World
- Written by: Mashino Sawazaki
- Illustrated by: Kō Furuya
- Published by: Shueisha
- Magazine: Saikyō Jump
- Original run: April 4, 2024 – present
- Anime television series

Shinkalion: Change the World
- Directed by: Kenichiro Komaya
- Written by: Eiji Umehara
- Music by: Yugo Kanno
- Studio: Signal.MD; Production I.G
- Original network: TXN (TV Tokyo), BS TV Tokyo
- Original run: April 7, 2024 – February 2, 2025
- Episodes: 39 + 3 specials
- Manga

Shinkalion: Change the World
- Written by: Naoto Tsushima
- Published by: Kadokawa Shoten
- Magazine: Shōnen Ace Plus
- Original run: October 1, 2024 – present

Shinkansen Henkei Robo Shinkalion (Japanese: 新幹線変形ロボ シンカリオン, Hepburn: Shinkansen Henkei Robo Shinkarion; "Transforming Bullet Train Robot Shinkalion") is a Japanese toy franchise created by Takara Tomy, in association with the Japan Railways Group. It is a spin-off of the long-running Plarail model train franchise which first launched in 2015. An anime adaptation by OLM aired on all JNN stations in Japan from January 2018 to June 2019. A second anime titled Shinkansen Henkei Robo Shinkalion Z aired from April 2021 to March 2022 on TV Tokyo. A third anime by Signal.MD and Production I.G titled Shinkalion: Change the World premiered in April 2024 and concluded in February 2025.

== Plot ==
=== Shinkalion THE ANIMATION ===
Several incidents of monster attacks from a mysterious group named Kitoralsus appeared suddenly in Japan after the appearance of the mysterious Black Shinkansen. In response, a secret organization called Shinkansen Ultra Evolution Institute was established in order to investigate the Black Shinkansen and its relations to the attacks using Shinkalions, bullet trains that turn into giant robots. However one day, Hayato Hayasugi, a young grade schooler who is a big railfan due to his father being a member of staff at the Railway Museum, accidentally got involved in the recent attack by the monsters and discovered his father's secret working with the Shinkansen Ultra Evolution Institute. Hayato shows a surprising amount of aptitude as a Shinkalion driver, based on him using a training application on his father's tablet that he mistook for a mobile game. Despite initial concerns from the adult members of the organization about having children as drivers, Hayato joins several other kids in using Shinkalions to willingly fight against the threat of the Kitoralsus.

=== Anime film ===
About half a year after the defeat of the Kitoralsus, giant monstrous beings suddenly appear from space led by both Nahane and Ohanefu, and are planning to take over the Earth. During these attacks, the Shinkansen Ultra Evolution Institute has been busy developing a new prototype unit - the Shinkalion ALFA-X. Suddenly, a 9-year old Hokuto appears from across time and space. Having no choice, the Shinkansen Ultra Evolution Institute appointed the young Hokuto to become the driver of the Shinkalion ALFA-X and bringing in the teams from all the branches across Japan as the last line of defense against the invaders threatening the planet.

=== Shinkalion Z ===
In preparation for an imminent attack, the Ultra Evolution Institute is developing a new type of robot called the "Shinkalion Z" as well as new armed enhancement rolling stocks known as "Zailiners" that transform from conventional trains to power up the "Shinkalion Z". The children with a high compatible rate who became the drivers of "Shinkalion Z" work together with the institute staff to confront the giant monstrous beings that appeared.

=== Shinkalion: Change The World ===
10 years ago, mysterious mechanical entities called UNKNOWN has been terrorizing all over Japan. To combat the threat of these invaders, the organization known as the Evolution Railway Development Agency or ERDA was formed using specialized combat train robots called Shinkalions. Though the fight against them has subsided, the organization continued to develop the Shinkalions and secretly made preparations for the return of the UNKNOWN.

Years later, Taisei Ōnari, a Junior High School student, attended the Shinkai Academy to find any clues on his older sister, Ina Ōnari's disappearance several years ago. He met up with Ryota Kuzuryu in class, inviting him to join the school's Railway Club and used the Metaverse simulator for the first time, which is being managed by ERDA's current leader Kadomichi Takanawa. Seeing Taisei has a very high Aptitude Rate, the UNKNOWN suddenly appeared after its last appearance and started to attack the city as he asked Taisei to become a Shinkalion driver due to his high Aptitude Rate than the other candidates. Despite being hesitant, he decided to become one after remembering some encouraging words from his missing sister, boarding inside the Shinkalion E5 Hayabusa to fight against the UNKNOWN and defeating it. He joined ERDA after the battle after finding out that his missing sister was an ERDA engineer.

== Development ==
The franchise's roots dates back to 2012, during the time when Takara Tomy revived the Tomica Hyper series. At the time, the Plarail Hyper Series did not do well in sales and was eventually discontinued in 2013. In order to redevelop the Plarail Hyper Series concept into a new series, Takara Tomy hired several experts from the Japan Railways Group for the new designs and concepts. The new concept is a transforming super robot in the vein of the Plarail series, and was inspired directly from several anime, notably Chō Tokkyū Hikarian. JR East Project and JR East Group were already long time sponsors of Takara Tomy during Plarail's development, and other branches of the Japan Railways group joined in on its development. The new project was announced under the codename "Project E5" during the 2014 Tokyo Toy Show, with special promotional animation created in collaboration with Japan Railways Group and Shogakukan Music & Digital Entertainment Inc. After the presentation, many changes on the concept were done in order for the toy to be finalized for retail sale and to be compatible with any Plarail tracks. After the changes, the first wave of toys were released on March 16, 2015.

Soon after the release of the toys, Takara Tomy announced that an anime of the series is in the works. The anime, aired in TBS, was released on January 6, 2018. The anime has notable crossovers from both the Vocaloid franchise and the Evangelion franchise in some of its episodes. Hayato and the E5 also cross over in the feature-length film for Tomica Hyper Rescue Drive Head Kidō Kyūkyū Keisatsu. In May 2019, Takara Tomy announced that the anime would end in Summer 2019. A sequel film is also announced to premiere in Winter 2019. In January 2021, a new anime series was announced for spring of that year.

In late December 2023, Takara Tomy later announced that a new season would be releasing in April 2024, titled Shinkalion: Change the World. This series concluded on February 2, 2025.

== Media ==
=== Merchandise ===
The original Shinkalion toy franchise was released as a spin-off of the Plarail franchise on March 16, 2015. The original toys released resemble regular Shinkansen trains complete with a front train, middle carriage and back train and that are compatible with any Plarail track. But the three components can transform and combine into a robot that is 18 inches in height and each figure comes with its own weapon and accessories. Also, each figure can also swap parts for added playability.

Within each year, new figures were officially released, especially during the Anime's run. The 2018 line also redesigned many existing models to look more like the animated designs and the real world shinkansen type, though the primary exceptions were the Black Shinkalion models, which were created from scratch-made designs drawn up specifically for the anime. Many of the models are the front and rear trains combined as the upper and lower robot half, with the middle carriage storing the weapons for the resulting robot. The toyline for the Z anime features additional train models that form enhanced replacement limbs and weapons. Unlike the Shinkalions, these models were based on conventional trains. The Change the World line focuses more on combination gimmicks than the last two lines, with weaponry based on non-rail vehicles.

Other merchandise of the series were also released in the form of keychains and novelties. Good Smile Company also released model kits of the mechas of the series under the Moderoid line of scale models, starting with the Shinkalion E5 Hayabusa in February 2019. A Nendoroid figure of Hatsune Miku, done in the style depicted in the anime series, was released in August 2019. In November 2025, Bandai released a brand new toy of the original E5 Hayabusa as depicted in the first anime in the long-running Soul of Chogokin toyline, commemorating the franchise's 10th anniversary.

=== Anime ===
An anime television series adaptation of the toyline, titled Shinkansen Henkei Robo Shinkalion THE ANIMATION (Japanese: 新幹線変形ロボ シンカリオン THE ANIMATION, Hepburn: Shinkansen Henkei Robo Shinkarion THE ANIMATION) was animated by OLM, an anime studio behind Pokémon, airing on all JNN stations in Japan from January 6, 2018, to June 29, 2019. It was directed by Takahiro Ikezoe (Show By Rock!!) and written by Kento Shimoyama (Servant × Service, Kamen Rider Zi-O). The opening song is titled "Shinka Riron" (進化理論; "Evolution Theory") by Boys and Men. The first ending song is titled "Go One Step Ahead" by Keisuke Murakami, the second ending is titled "I WANNA BE WITH YOU" by TETSUYA, the third ending is titled "Go Way!" by Silent Siren, the fourth ending is titled "STARTRAiN" by Amatsuki and the fifth ending is titled "Start Line" (スタートライン, Sutātorain) by BERRY GOODMAN. The series' music is composed by Toshiyuki Watanabe (Galactic Armored Fleet Majestic Prince, Space Brothers).

A second anime television series titled Shinkansen Henkei Robo Shinkalion Z THE ANIMATION (Japanese: 新幹線変形ロボ シンカリオンZ THE ANIMATION, Hepburn: Shinkansen Henkei Robo Shinkarion Zett THE ANIMATION) aired from April 9, 2021, to March 18, 2022, on TV Tokyo. Kentaro Yamaguchi is directing the series at OLM, with Takahiro Ikezoe serving as chief director. Ikezoe and Masanao Akahoshi are penning the series' scripts and Norihito Sumitomo is composing the series' music. The opening song is titled "New Challenger" (ニューチャレンジャー, Nyūcharenjā) by Boys and Men. The first ending song is titled "Bond Rail" (キズナ・レール, Kizuna Rēru) by Morinaka Kazaki meets ▽▲TRiNITY▲▽, the second ending song is titled "Running Up Voltage" (駆け上がるボルテージ, Kakeagaru borutēji) by Urashimasakatasen, the third ending song is titled "Terminal ~Where We Should Be~" (ターミナル ~僕ら、あるべき場所~, Tāminaru ~Bokura, Arubeki Basho) by Luce Twinkle Wink☆ and the fourth ending song is titled "Fastest!" by KOTOKO.

A third anime television series titled Shinkansen Henkei Robo Shinkalion: Change the World (Japanese: 新幹線変形ロボ シンカリオン チェンジ ザ ワールド, Hepburn: Shinkansen Henkei Robo Shinkarion Chenji Za Wārudo) was announced on December 26, 2023. It is produced by Signal.MD and Production I.G and directed by Kenichiro Komaya, with Eiji Umehara writing series scripts, Shiori Asaka and Niina Morita designing the characters, and Yugo Kanno composing the music. It premiered on April 7, 2024, on TV Tokyo. GRe4N BOYZ performed the series's opening theme "Senkou Hayabusa" (閃光ハヤブサ, Senkō Hayabusa; "Lightning Flash Hayabusa"). meiyo performed the first ending theme "HOPE!HOPE!HOPE!", THE ALFEE performed the second ending theme "KO.DA.MA." and Sayaka Yamamoto performed the third ending theme song "Seagull". Unlike the first two shows, Change the World takes place in an entirely separate continuity.

==== Episode list ====
===== Shinkansen Henkei Robo Shinkalion =====
No.	Title	Directed by (Note: Information is taken from the ending credits of each episode.)	Written by	Original release date
1	"Now Departing!! Shinkalion E5 Hayabusa"; Transliteration: "Shuppatsu!! Shinkarion Ī Faibu Hayabusa" (Japanese: 出発!!シンカリオン E5はやぶさ)	Hiroki Negishi	Kento Shimoyama	January 6, 2018
2	"Clash!! Shinkalion VS the Giant Monstrous Being"; Transliteration: "Taiketsu!! Shinkarion Tai Kyodai Kaibuttai" (Japanese: 対決!!シンカリオンVS巨大怪物体)	Tomonori Mine	Kento Shimoyama	January 13, 2018
3	"Here He Comes!! The Sniper From Akita"; Transliteration: "Kitare!! Akita Kara no Sunaipā" (Japanese: 来たれ!!秋田からのスナイパー)	Yoshitaka Koyama	Kento Shimoyama	January 20, 2018
4	"Fire!! Shinkalion E6 Komachi"; Transliteration: "Ute!! Shinkarion Ī Shikkusu Komachi" (Japanese: 撃て!!シンカリオン E6こまち)	Kyōhei Suzuki	Kento Shimoyama	January 27, 2018
5	"Clash!! Iron Steamer"; Transliteration: "Gekitotsu!! Aian Suchīmā" (Japanese: 激突!!アイアンスチーマー)	Takuma Suzuki	Kento Shimoyama	February 3, 2018
6	"Break Through!! Shinkalion E7 Kagayaki"; Transliteration: "Tsuranuke!! Shinkarion Ī Sebun Kagayaki" (Japanese: 貫け!!シンカリオン E7かがやき)	Sumito Sasaki	Kento Shimoyama	February 10, 2018
7	"Cooperation!! Hayato is a Loyal Son"; Transliteration: "Kyōryoku!! Hayato wa Kōkō Musuko" (Japanese: 協力!!ハヤトは孝行息子)	Toshiyuki Sone	Ken'ichi Yamashita	February 17, 2018
8	"Link Up!! The First Link Combination"; Transliteration: "Renketsu!! Hajimete no Rinku Gattai" (Japanese: 連結!!初めてのリンク合体)	Yoshitaka Koyama	Kento Shimoyama	February 24, 2018
9	"Battle!! The Ultra Evolution Institute's Hot Springs Trip"; Transliteration: "Nettō!! Chō Shinka Kenkyūjo Onsen Ryokō" (Japanese: 熱闘!!超進化研究所温泉旅行)	Toshiyuki Sone	Kento Shimoyama	March 3, 2018
10	"Hide!! Shinkalion E3 Tsubasa"; Transliteration: "Shinobe!! Shinkarion Ī Surī Tsubasa" (Japanese: 忍べ!!シンカリオン E3つばさ)	Yoshito Hata	Ken'ichi Yamashita	March 10, 2018
11	"Polish!! The Old Mechanic of the Institute"; Transliteration: "Migake!! Kenkyūjo no Rō Mekanikku" (Japanese: 磨け!!研究所の老メカニック)	Takahide Ogata	Kento Shimoyama	March 17, 2018
12	"Impact!! Shinkalion N700A Nozomi"; Transliteration: "Shōgeki!! Shinkarion Enu Nana Hyaku Ē Nozomi" (Japanese: 衝撃!!シンカリオン N700Aのぞみ)	Takuma Suzuki	Kento Shimoyama	March 24, 2018
13	"Decisive Battle!! Shinkalion VS Genbu"; Transliteration: "Kessen!! Shinkarion Tai Genbu" (Japanese: 決戦!!シンカリオンVSゲンブ)	Toshiyuki Sone	Kento Shimoyama	March 31, 2018
14	"The Arrival!! The New Agent Suzaku"; Transliteration: "Tōjō!! Arata Naru Ējento Suzaku" (Japanese: 登場!!新たなるエージェント スザク)	Takahide Ogata	Shūichi Kōyama	April 14, 2018
15	"Go North!! Shinkalion H5 Hayabusa"; Transliteration: "Kita e!! Shinkarion Eichi Faibu Hayabusa" (Japanese: 北へ!!シンカリオン H5はやぶさ)	Yoshitaka Koyama	Ken'ichi Yamashita	April 21, 2018
16	"Explosion!! Miku and Hayato's Double Turnstile Sword"; Transliteration: "Sakuretsu!! Miku to Hayato no Daburu Kaisatsu Sōdo" (Japanese: 炸裂!!ミクとハヤトのダブルカイサツソード)	Tomonori Mine	Ken'ichi Yamashita	April 28, 2018
17	"Go West!! Shinkalion VS Osaka Cuisine!?"; Transliteration: "Nishi e!! Shinkarion Tai Ōsaka Meibutsu!?" (Japanese: 西へ!!シンカリオンVS大阪名物！？)	Chikayo Nakamura	Keiichirō Ōchi	May 5, 2018
18	"Darkness!! The Black Shinkalion Appears"; Transliteration: "Shikkoku!! Burakku Shinkarion Arawaru" (Japanese: 漆黒!!ブラックシンカリオン現る)	Takahide Ogata	Kento Shimoyama	May 12, 2018
19	"Duel!! Shinkalion VS Black Shinkalion"; Transliteration: "Kettō!! Shinkarion Tai Burakku Shinkarion" (Japanese: 決闘!!シンカリオンVSブラックシンカリオン)	Toshiyuki Sone	Kento Shimoyama	May 19, 2018
20	"Escape!! Shashot was Manipulated"; Transliteration: "Tōbō!! Ayatsurareta Shashotto" (Japanese: 逃亡!!操られたシャショット)	Akira Katō	Shūichi Kōyama	May 26, 2018
21	"Spread Your Wings! Shinkalion 800 Tsubame"; Transliteration: "Habatake! Shinkarion Happyaku Tsubame" (Japanese: はばたけ！シンカリオン 800つばめ)	Takahide Ogata	Ken'ichi Yamashita	June 2, 2018
22	"To the Sky!! E5 Hayabusa + 800 Tsubame"; Transliteration: "Sora e!! Ī Faibu Hayabusa Rinku Happyaku Tsubame" (Japanese: 空へ!!E5はやぶさ + 800つばめ)	Yoshito Hata	Ken'ichi Yamashita	June 9, 2018
23	"Deploy!! Shinkalion 500 Kodama"; Transliteration: "Shutsudō!! Shinkarion Go Hyaku Kodama" (Japanese: 出動!!シンカリオン 500こだま)	Chikayo Nakamura	Keiichirō Ōchi	June 16, 2018
24	"Invasion!! The Micro Giant Monstrous Being"; Transliteration: "Shinnyū!! Mikuro no Kyodai Kaibuttai" (Japanese: 侵入!!ミクロの巨大怪物体)	Takahide Ogata	Kento Shimoyama	June 23, 2018
25	"Rematch!! Shinkalion VS Black Shinkalion"; Transliteration: "Saisen!! Shinkarion Tai Burakku Shinkarion" (Japanese: 再戦!!シンカリオンVSブラックシンカリオン)	Toshiyuki Sone	Shūichi Kōyama	June 30, 2018
26	"Threat!! Black Shinkalion Berserker Mode"; Transliteration: "Kyōi!! Burakku Shinkarion Bāsākā Mōdo" (Japanese: 脅威!!ブラックシンカリオン・バーサーカーモード)	Tomonori Mine	Shūichi Kōyama	July 7, 2018
27	"Counterattack!! E5 × 500"; Transliteration: "Hangeki!! Ī Faibu Kurosu Go Hyaku" (Japanese: 反撃!! E5×500)	Takahide Ogata	Ken'ichi Yamashita	July 14, 2018
28	"Nagoya!! Commander Izumi's Past"; Transliteration: "Nagoya!! Izumi Shireichō no Kako" (Japanese: 名古屋!!出水指令長の過去)	Shunsuke Machitani	Kento Shimoyama	July 21, 2018
29	"To the Sea!! Investigate the Enemy Signal"; Transliteration: "Umi e!! Teki no Denpa Shingō o Sagure" (Japanese: 海へ!!敵の電波信号を探れ)	Shin'ya Sadamitsu	Kento Shimoyama	July 28, 2018
30	"Kyoto!! Hayato and Azusa's Trip Together"; Transliteration: "Kyōto!! Hayato to Azusa no Futari Tabi" (Japanese: 京都!!ハヤトとアズサの二人旅)	Takahide Ogata	Keiichirō Ōchi	August 4, 2018
31	"Launch!! Shinkalion 500 TYPE EVA"; Transliteration: "Hasshin!! Shinkarion Go Hyaku Taipu Eva" (Japanese: 発進!!シンカリオン 500 TYPE EVA)	Toshiyuki Sone	Keiichirō Ōchi	August 11, 2018
32	"Camping!! The Invisible Giant Monstrous Being"; Transliteration: "Kyanpu!! Mienai Kyodai Kaibuttai" (Japanese: キャンプ!!見えない巨大怪物体)	Chikayo Nakamura	Shūichi Kōyama	August 18, 2018
33	"Homework!! Hayato's Great Picture Diary Strategy"; Transliteration: "Shukudai!! Hayato no Enikki Dai Sakusen" (Japanese: 宿題!!ハヤトの絵日記大作戦)	Takahide Ogata	Ken'ichi Yamashita	August 25, 2018
34	"Confrontation!! Shinkalion 700 Series"; Transliteration: "Tairitsu!! Shinkarion Nana Hyaku Shirīzu" (Japanese: 対立!!シンカリオン 700シリーズ)	Mamoru Enomoto	Kento Shimoyama	September 1, 2018
35	"Unite!! Shinkalion 700 Trinity"; Transliteration: "Danketsu!! Shinkarion Nana Hyaku Torinitī" (Japanese: 団結!!シンカリオン 700トリニティー)	Shin'ya Sadamitsu	Kento Shimoyama	September 8, 2018
36	"Go South!! Search for the Enemy Hideout in Sakurajima"; Transliteration: "Minami e!! Sakurajima no Teki Ajito o Sagase" (Japanese: 南へ!!桜島の敵アジトを探せ)	Takahide Ogata	Kento Shimoyama	September 15, 2018
37	"Encounter!! Hayato and Seiryu"; Transliteration: "Sōgū!! Hayato to Seiryū" (Japanese: 遭遇!!ハヤトとセイリュウ)	Toshiyuki Sone	Kento Shimoyama	September 22, 2018
38	"Reinforcements!! Shinkalion Doctor Yellow"; Transliteration: "Kyūen!! Shinkarion Dokutā Ierō" (Japanese: 救援!!シンカリオン ドクターイエロー)	Nobuyoshi Arai	Kento Shimoyama	September 29, 2018
39	"Dialog!! Hayato and Ryuji's Karate Training"; Transliteration: "Taiwa!! Hayato to Ryūji no Karate Shugyō" (Japanese: 対話!!ハヤトとリュウジの空手修行)	Takahide Ogata	Kento Shimoyama	October 6, 2018
40	"Go Underground!! Shinkalion VS Byakko"; Transliteration: "Chika e!! Shinkarion Tai Byakko" (Japanese: 地下へ!!シンカリオンVSビャッコ)	Daigo Yamagishi	Kento Shimoyama	October 13, 2018
41	"Meeting!! Hayato's Birthday Celebration"; Transliteration: "Kaigi!! Hayato no Tanjōbi o Iwae" (Japanese: 会議!!ハヤトの誕生日を祝え)	Shin'ya Sadamitsu	Kento Shimoyama	October 20, 2018
42	"Go East!! The First Trip in Gran Class"; Transliteration: "Higashi e!! Hajimete no Guran Kurasu" (Japanese: 東へ!!初めてのグランクラス)	Takahide Ogata	Kento Shimoyama	October 27, 2018
43	"Cultural Exchange!! Explore Dialog With Genbu"; Transliteration: "Kōryū!! Genbu to no Taiwa o Sagure" (Japanese: 交流!!ゲンブとの対話を探れ)	Toshiyuki Sone	Kento Shimoyama	November 3, 2018
44	"Family!! The Cake of Akita's Memories"; Transliteration: "Kazoku!! Akita to Omoide no Kēki" (Japanese: 家族!!アキタと思い出のケーキ)	Daigo Yamagishi	Kento Shimoyama	November 10, 2018
45	"Yamagata!! Shinobu's Retiring as a Driver!?"; Transliteration: "Yamagata!! Shinobu ga Untenshi Dattai!?" (Japanese: 山形!!シノブが運転士脱退!?)	Takahide Ogata	Kento Shimoyama	November 17, 2018
46	"Invasion!! Fury of the Black Shinkalion"; Transliteration: "Shūrai!! Ikari no Burakku Shinkarion" (Japanese: 襲来!!怒りのブラックシンカリオン)	Daiki Katō	Kento Shimoyama	November 24, 2018
47	"Compatibility!! E5 × Doctor Yellow"; Transliteration: "Tekigō!! Ī Faibu Kurosu Dokutā Ierō" (Japanese: 適合!!E5×ドクターイエロー)	Shin'ya Sadamitsu	Kento Shimoyama	December 1, 2018
48	"The Organizers!! The Big Ultra Evolution Institute Year-End Party"; Transliteration: "Shiwasu!! Chō Shinka Kenkyūjo Dai Bōnenkai" (Japanese: 師走!!超進化研究所大忘年会)	Takahide Ogata	Kento Shimoyama	December 8, 2018
49	"Gale Force!! E3 Tsubasa Iron Wing"; Transliteration: "Shippū!! Ī Surī Tsubasa Aian Uingu" (Japanese: 疾風!!E3つばさ アイアンウイング)	Toshiyuki Sone	Kento Shimoyama	December 15, 2018
50	"United Front!! Black Shinkalion VS Torame"; Transliteration: "Kyōtō!! Burakku Shinkarion Tai Torame" (Japanese: 共闘!!ブラックシンカリオンVSトラメ)	Takuo Suzuki	Kento Shimoyama	December 22, 2018
51	"Update!! Futaba's Official Report"; Transliteration: "Kōshin!! Futaba no Gyōmu Nisshi" (Japanese: 更新!!フタバの業務日誌)	Ryusora Okada	Kento Shimoyama; Kenichi Yamashita; Keiichiro Ōchi; Shūchi Kōyama	December 29, 2018
52	"All Together!! The Shinkalion Drivers' New Years Party"; Transliteration: "Tsudoe!! Shinkarion Untenshi Shin'nenkai" (Japanese: 集え!!シンカリオン運転士新年会)	Daigo Yamagishi	Keiichirō Ōchi	January 5, 2019
53	"Quiz!! Black Shinkalion and a Penguin"; Transliteration: "Kuizu!! Burakku Shinkarion to Pengin" (Japanese: クイズ!!ブラックシンカリオンとペンギン)	Norihiko Nagahama	Kento Shimoyama	January 12, 2019
54	"Yo!! N700A and Ryuji's Blues"; Transliteration: "Osu!! Enu Nana Hyaku Ē to Ryūji no Burūsu" (Japanese: 押忍!!N700Aとリュウジのブルース)	Hideaki Ōba	Kento Shimoyama	January 19, 2019
55	"Super Super Super Speed!! Black Shinkalion Crimson"; Transliteration: "Chō Chō Chō Kasoku!! Burakku Shinkarion Kurenai" (Japanese: 超・超・超加速!!ブラックシンカリオン紅)	Yoshihisa Matsumoto	Kento Shimoyama	January 26, 2019
56	"Beans!! Seiryu the Demon"; Transliteration: "Mame!! Oni no Seiryū" (Japanese: 豆!!鬼のセイリュウ)	Daiki Katō	Kento Shimoyama	February 2, 2019
57	"Investigative Report!! Kitoralsus 24 Hours"; Transliteration: "Mitchaku!! Kitoraruzasu Nijū-yoji" (Japanese: 密着!!キトラルザス24時)	Ryusora Okada	Ryusora Okada	February 9, 2019
58	"Fight!! Express and the Early Days of the E2"; Transliteration: "Faito!! Ekusupuresu to Seishun no Ī Ni-kei" (Japanese: ファイト!!エクスプレスと青春のE2系)	Dai Seki; Masahiko Watanabe	Kento Shimoyama	February 16, 2019
59	"Connection!! Shinkalion and the Power of Stew"; Transliteration: "Tsunage!! Shinkarion to Nabe no Chikara" (Japanese: 繋げ!!シンカリオンと鍋の力)	Norihiko Nagahama	Kento Shimoyama	February 23, 2019
60	"Grand Strategy!! Team Shinkalion United"; Transliteration: "Dai Sakusen!! Danketsu Chīmu Shinkarion" (Japanese: 大作戦!!団結チームシンカリオン)	Hideaki Ōba	Kento Shimoyama	March 2, 2019
61	"Desperate Battle!! E5 × 500 VS Kairen"; Transliteration: "Dai Gekisen!! Ī Faibu Kurosu Go Hyaku Tai Kairen" (Japanese: 大激戦!!E5×500VSカイレン)	Daiki Katō	Kento Shimoyama	March 9, 2019
62	"Farewell!! Shashot Forever..."; Transliteration: "Saraba!! Shashotto yo Eien ni..." (Japanese: さらば!!シャショットよ永遠に...)	Yoshihisa Matsumoto	Kento Shimoyama	March 16, 2019
63	"Gigantic Deployment!! Tokyo Station Central Intercept System"; Transliteration: "Kyodai Tenkai!! Tōkyō Eki Chūō Geigeki Shisutemu" (Japanese: 巨大展開!!東京駅・中央迎撃システム)	Mihiro Yamaguchi	Kento Shimoyama	March 23, 2019
64	"Super Evolution!! E5 Hayabusa Mk II"; Transliteration: "Chōzetsu Shinka!! Ī Faibu Hayabusa Māku Tsū" (Japanese: 超絶進化!!E5はやぶさ MkII)	Norihiko Nagahama	Kento Shimoyama	March 30, 2019
65	"New Semester New Developments!!! The Mysterious Shinkansen Festival"; Transliteration: "Shin Gakki Shin Tenkai!!! Nazo no Shinkansen Matsuri" (Japanese: 新学期 新展開!!!謎の新幹線祭り)	Yoshiaki Okumura	Kento Shimoyama	April 6, 2019
66	"Megaburst!! Omagari Grand Cross"; Transliteration: "Dai Sakuretsu!! Ōmagari Guran Kurosu" (Japanese: 大炸裂!!オオマガリグランクロス)	Osamu Sekita	Kento Shimoyama	April 20, 2019
67	"Continue!! Wheelset Drill Has a Mk II Too"; Transliteration: "Tsuzuke!! Sharin Doriru mo Māku Tsū" (Japanese: 続け!!シャリンドリルもMkII)	Shigeki Awai	Kento Shimoyama	April 27, 2019
68	"Mysterious Foe!! Black Shinkalion Numbers"; Transliteration: "Nazo no Teki!! Burakku Shinkarion Nanbāzu" (Japanese: 謎の敵!!ブラックシンカリオン ナンバーズ)	Yoshihisa Matsumoto	Kento Shimoyama	May 4, 2019
69	"Change!! Shinkariser"; Transliteration: "Chenji!! Shinkaraizā" (Japanese: チェンジ!!シンカライザー)	Norihiko Nagahama	Kento Shimoyama	May 11, 2019
70	"Shock!! Seiryu's Sorrow"; Transliteration: "Shokku!! Kanashimi no Seiryū" (Japanese: ショック!!悲しみのセイリュウ)	Shigeki Awai	Kento Shimoyama	May 18, 2019
71	"The Mightiest!! Black Shinkalion Ogre"; Transliteration: "Saikyō!! Burakku Shinkarion Ōga" (Japanese: 最強!!ブラックシンカリオンオーガ)	Takeyuki Sadohara	Kento Shimoyama	May 25, 2019
72	"Coexistence!! Humans and Kitoralsus"; Transliteration: "Kyōzon!! Hito to Kitoraruzasu" (Japanese: 共存!!ヒトとキトラルザス)	Mihiro Yamaguchi	Kento Shimoyama	June 1, 2019
73	"The Ultimate Overcross!! 923 Doctor Yellow"; Transliteration: "Kyūkyoku no Ōbākurosu!! Kyū Nī San Dokutā Ierō" (Japanese: 究極のオーバークロス!!923ドクターイエロー)	Daiki Katō	Kento Shimoyama	June 8, 2019
74	"Huge Explosion!! Jet Black Duel"; Transliteration: "Dai Bakuhatsu!! Shikkoku no Dyueru" (Japanese: 大爆発!!漆黒の決闘)	Yoshihisa Matsumoto	Kento Shimoyama	June 15, 2019
75	"Final Battle!! Team Shinkalion VS Black Shinkalion Ogre"; Transliteration: "Saishū Kessen!! Chīmu Shinkarion Tai Burakku Shinkarion Ōga" (Japanese: 最終決戦!!チームシンカリオンVSブラックシンカリオンオーガ)	Mihiro Yamaguchi	Kento Shimoyama	June 22, 2019
76	"Final Station!! New Departures for Shinkalion"; Transliteration: "Shūchaku!! Shinkarion to Arata Naru Shuppatsu" (Japanese: 終着!!シンカリオンと新たなる出発)	Norihiko Nagahama	Kento Shimoyama	June 29, 2019

===== Shinkansen Henkei Robo Shinkalion Z =====
No. overall	No. in season	Title	Directed by	Written by	Original release date
77	1	"New Departure Progress!"; Transliteration: "Arata Naru Shuppatsu Shinkō!" (Japanese: 新たなる出発進行！)	Shunji Maki	Masanao Akahoshi	April 9, 2021
78	2	"Z Combination! E235 Yamanote"; Transliteration: "Zetto Gattai! Ī Nī San Go Yamanote" (Japanese: Z合体！E235ヤマノテ)	Seo Hye-Jin	Masanao Akahoshi	April 16, 2021
79	3	"Blast Through! VVVF Blaster!!"; Transliteration: "Buchinuke! Bui Bui Bui Efu Burasutā!!" (Japanese: ぶち抜け！VVVFブラスター！！)	Nanako Shimazaki	Masanao Akahoshi	April 23, 2021
80	4	"Set Off! Hanabi's Rock and Roll!!"; Transliteration: "Uchiagero! Hanabi no Rokkun Rōru!!" (Japanese: 打ち上げろ！ハナビのロックンロール！！)	Fumio Itō	Masanao Akahoshi	April 30, 2021
81	5	"Protect the Forest! Shinkalion Z E7 Kagayaki"; Transliteration: "Mori o Mamore! Shinkarion Zetto Ī Sebun Kagayaki" (Japanese: 森を守れ！シンカリオンZ E7かがやき)	Kentarō Fujita	Akira Tanizaki	May 7, 2021
82	6	"Swing Through! The High Voltage Axe of Friendship!!"; Transliteration: "Furinuke! Yūjō no Kōden'atsu Akkusu!!" (Japanese: 振り抜け！友情のコウデンアツアックス！！)	Sumito Sasaki	Akira Tanizaki	May 14, 2021
83	7	"Assault! Yokokawa Branch Defense Battle!!"; Transliteration: "Kyōshū! Yokokawa Shibu Bōei-sen!!" (Japanese: 強襲！横川支部防衛戦！！)	Kō Nakagawa	Masanao Akahoshi	May 21, 2021
84	8	"Assemble! Ōmiya Branch Restarted!!"; Transliteration: "Shūketsu Seyo! Ōmiya Shibu Saishidō!!" (Japanese: 集結せよ！大宮支部再始動！！)	Yoshito Hata	Masanao Akahoshi	May 28, 2021
85	9	"Soar! Shinkalion Z 800 Sonic"; Transliteration: "Kakero! Shinkarion Zetto Happyaku Sonikku" (Japanese: 翔けろ！シンカリオンZ 800ソニック)	Yūzō Sasaki	Daisuke Ishibashi	June 4, 2021
86	10	"Great Aerial Battle! Disturbed Z Combination!!"; Transliteration: "Dai Kūchū-sen! Haran no Zetto Gattai!!" (Japanese: 大空中戦！波乱のZ合体！！)	Seo Hye-Jin	Daisuke Ishibashi	June 11, 2021
87	11	"First Battle! Shinkalion Z N700S Nozomi"; Transliteration: "Uijin! Shinkarion Zetto Enu Nana Hyaku Esu Nozomi" (Japanese: 初陣！シンカリオンZ N700Sのぞみ)	Toshiyuki Sone	Ken'ichi Yamashita	June 18, 2021
88	12	"Secret Technique! Dual Grampus System"; Transliteration: "Higi! Dyuaru Guranpasu Shisutemu" (Japanese: 秘技！デュアル・グランパス・システム)	Kentarō Fujita	Ken'ichi Yamashita	June 25, 2021
89	13	"Get Up Z Combination! Battle of Sekigahara!!"; Transliteration: "Tate yo Zetto Gattai! Sekigahara Sōryoku-sen!!" (Japanese: 起てよZ合体！関ヶ原総力戦！！)	Sumito Sasaki	Ken'ichi Yamashita	July 16, 2021
90	14	"Cruel Black! Dark Shinkalion!!"; Transliteration: "Zankoku! Dāku Shinkarion!!" (Japanese: 斬黒！ダークシンカリオン！！)	Yoshito Hata	Daisuke Ishibashi	July 23, 2021
91	15	"Qualification of Leader! The Angry Z Gran Cross"; Transliteration: "Rīdā no Shikaku! Ikari no Zetto Gurankurosu" (Japanese: リーダーの資格！怒りのZグランクロス)	Yūzō Sasaki	Daisuke Ishibashi	July 30, 2021
92	16	"Lovely Advent! Shinkalion Hello Kitty"; Transliteration: "Karen ni Kōrin! Shinkarion Harō Kiti" (Japanese: 可憐に降臨！シンカリオン ハローキティ)	Kō Nakagawa	Toshiaki Satō	August 13, 2021
93	17	"Glitter☆Shinkalion Z 500 Kodama"; Transliteration: "Kirameku☆Shinkarion Zetto Go Hyaku Kodama" (Japanese: きらめく☆シンカリオンZ 500こだま)	Seo Hye-Jin	Daisuke Ishibashi	August 20, 2021
94	18	"The Decisive Battle in Ganryu Island! Shin VS Ginga!?"; Transliteration: "Ganryū-jima Kessen! Shin Tai Ginga!?" (Japanese: 巌流島決戦！シンVSギンガ！？)	Kentarō Fujita	Daisuke Ishibashi	August 27, 2021
95	19	"Shining! The Osaka Loop Line Signal Blade"; Transliteration: "Kagayake! Ōsaka Kanjō Shingōtō" (Japanese: 輝け！オオサカカンジョウシンゴウトウ)	Toshiyuki Sone	Daisuke Ishibashi	September 3, 2021
96	20	"Awaken! The Yamanote Excalibur!!"; Transliteration: "Kakusei Seyo! Yamanote Ekisukaribā!!" (Japanese: 覚醒せよ！ヤマノテエキスカリバー！！)	Haru Shinomiya	Toshiaki Satō	September 10, 2021
97	21	"Sortie, Shinkalion Z 500 TYPE EVA"; Transliteration: "Shutsugeki, Shinkarion Zetto Go Hyaku Taipu Eva" (Japanese: 出撃、シンカリオンZ 500 TYPE EVA)	Kō Nakagawa	Toshiaki Satō	September 17, 2021
98	22	"The Counterattack of Shinkalion Z Doctor Yellow"; Transliteration: "Gyakushū no Shinkarion Zetto Dokutā Ierō" (Japanese: 逆襲のシンカリオンZ ドクターイエロー)	Yūzō Sasaki	Ken'ichi Yamashita	October 1, 2021
99	23	"Underground Decisive Battle! Doctor Yellow Z Hosen Mode"; Transliteration: "Chika Kessen! Dokutā Ierō Zetto Hosen Mōdo" (Japanese: 地下決戦！ドクターイエロー Zホセンモード)	Yoshito Hata	Ken'ichi Yamashita	October 8, 2021
100	24	"Return of Seiryu"; Transliteration: "Seiryū no Kikan" (Japanese: セイリュウの帰還)	Seo Hye-Jin	Daisuke Ishibashi	October 22, 2021
101	25	"SHIKOKU ROCK FESTIVAL"; Transliteration: "Shikoku Rokku Fesutibaru" (Japanese: SHIKOKU ROCK FESTIVAL)	Kentarō Fujita	Toshiaki Satō	October 29, 2021
102	26	"Taiju and the Galactic Railroad Girl"; Transliteration: "Taiju to Ginga Tetsudō no Shōjo" (Japanese: タイジュと銀河鉄道の少女)	Sadao Ōshima	Ken'ichi Yamashita	November 5, 2021
103	27	"Threat! Valtom's Obsession"; Transliteration: "Kyōi! Varutomu no Shūnen" (Japanese: 脅威！ヴァルトムの執念)	Masaki Satō	Daisuke Ishibashi	November 12, 2021
104	28	"Communicate! Shinkalion Z H5 Hayabusa"; Transliteration: "Kōshin Seyo! Shinkarion Zetto Eichi Faibu Hayabusa" (Japanese: 交信せよ！シンカリオンZ H5はやぶさ)	Yūzō Sasaki	Ken'ichi Yamashita	November 19, 2021
105	29	"Teoti Upheaval! Raid, Dark Shinkalion"; Transliteration: "Teoti Dōran! Kyūshū, Dāku Shinkarion" (Japanese: テオティ動乱！急襲、ダークシンカリオン)	Nobuyoshi Arai	Toshiaki Satō	December 3, 2021
106	30	"Super Z Combine! Shinkalion Z E5 Doctor Yellow"; Transliteration: "Chō Zetsu Gattai! Shinkarion Zetto Ī Faibu Dokutā Ierō" (Japanese: 超Z合体！シンカリオンZ E5ドクターイエロー)	Kentarō Yamaguchi	Toshiaki Satō	December 10, 2021
107	31	"Scoop! Ayu's Exclusive Front Line!"; Transliteration: "Sukūpu! Ayu no Tokudane Saizensen!" (Japanese: スクープ！アユの特ダネ最前線！)	Seo Hye-Jin	Daisuke Ishibashi	December 17, 2021
108	32	"H5 Hokuto VS Valdor Galactic Journey"; Transliteration: "Eichi Faibu Hokuto Tai Varudoru Ginga no Tabiji" (Japanese: H5ホクトVSヴァルドル 銀河の旅路)	Sadao Ōshima	Ken'ichi Yamashita	December 24, 2021
109	33	"Legendary Driver! Hayato Hayasugi"; Transliteration: "Densetsu no Untenshi! Hayasugi Hayato" (Japanese: 伝説の運転士！速杉ハヤト)	Daigo Yamagishi	Toshiaki Satō	January 14, 2022
110	34	"The Galaxy Express E5"; Transliteration: "Za Gyarakushī Ekusupuresu Ī Faibu" (Japanese: The Galaxy Express E5)	Kentarō Fujita	Daisuke Ishibashi	January 21, 2022
111	35	"Tokonami's Past"; Transliteration: "Tokonami no Kako" (Japanese: トコナミの過去)	Yūzō Sasaki	Daisuke Ishibashi	January 28, 2022
112	36	"Settlement, Shin and Abuto"; Transliteration: "Ketchaku, Shin to Abuto" (Japanese: 決着、シンとアブト)	Shunji Maki	Ken'ichi Yamashita	February 4, 2022
113	37	"Super Evolution! Dark Shinkalion"; Transliteration: "Chō Shinka! Dāku Shinkarion" (Japanese: 超進化！ダークシンカリオン)	Kentarō Yamaguchi	Toshiaki Satō	February 18, 2022
114	38	"Complete Domination! Shinka Getter"; Transliteration: "Kanzen Seiha! Shinkari Gettā" (Japanese: 完全制覇！シンカリゲッター)	Kō Nakagawa	Daisuke Ishibashi	February 25, 2022
115	39	"Kannagi VS Dark Shinkalion Absolute"; Transliteration: "Kannagi Tai Dāku Shinkarion Abusoryūto" (Japanese: カンナギVSダークシンカリオンアブソリュート)	Sadao Ōshima	Ken'ichi Yamashita	March 4, 2022
116	40	"Revival!! Destruction God Arabaki"; Transliteration: "Fukkatsu!! Hakaishin Arabaki" (Japanese: 復活！！破壊神アラバキ)	Kentarō Fujita	Toshiaki Satō	March 11, 2022
117	41	"The Possibility is Infinity!"; Transliteration: "Kanōsei wa Mugendai!" (Japanese: 可能性は無限大！)	Shunji Maki	Toshiaki Satō	March 18, 2022

===== Shinkalion: Change the World =====
No.	Title	Directed by	Written by	Original release date
1	"Change the World"; Transliteration: "Chenji Za Wārudo" (Japanese: CHANGE THE WORLD)	Kazuya Mihashi	Eiji Umehara	April 7, 2024
2	"Driver Taisei Ōnari"; Transliteration: "Untenshi Ōnari Taisei" (Japanese: 運転士 大成タイセイ)	Fumihiro Matsui	Eiji Umehara	April 14, 2024
3	"Insufficient Aptitude Rate"; Transliteration: "Tarinai Tekisei-chi" (Japanese: 足りない適性値)	Ying Chen Lin	Daisuke Ishibashi	April 21, 2024
4	"Ryota's True Feelings"; Transliteration: "Ryōta no Hon'ne" (Japanese: リョータの本音)	Kazuya Mihashi	Daisuke Ishibashi	April 28, 2024
5	"Akane's Melancholy"; Transliteration: "Akane no Yūutsu" (Japanese: アカネの憂鬱)	Fumihiro Matsui	Gigaemon Ichikawa	May 5, 2024
6	"Fate Has Started Running"; Transliteration: "Hashiri Hajimeta Unmei" (Japanese: 走り始めた運命)	Ryu Yashima	Gigaemon Ichikawa	May 12, 2024
7	"Genius Driver"; Transliteration: "Tensai Untenshi" (Japanese: 天才運転士)	Kazuya Mihashi	Kenichi Yamashita	May 19, 2024
8	"Form of Friends"; Transliteration: "Tomodachi no Katachi" (Japanese: 友達のカタチ)	Shigeru Ueda	Asako Kuboyama	May 26, 2024
9	"His True Identity"; Transliteration: "Kare no Shōtai" (Japanese: 彼の正体)	Mitsuhiro Ōgata	Eiji Umehara	June 2, 2024
10	"True Self"; Transliteration: "Honto no Jibun" (Japanese: 本当の自分)	Fumihiro Matsui	Chiaki Nishinaka	June 9, 2024
11	"Older Sister's Phantom"; Transliteration: "Ane no Gen'ei" (Japanese: 姉の幻影)	Shigeru Ueda	Daisuke Ishibashi	June 16, 2024
12	"Reunion"; Transliteration: "Saikai" (Japanese: 再会)	Penny Hong	Gigaemon Ichikawa	June 23, 2024
13	"Cool Person"; Transliteration: "Kakkoii Hito" (Japanese: カッコイイ人)	Ichio Kunimoto	Eiji Umehara	June 30, 2024
Special–1	"Lost Memories"; Transliteration: "Ushinawareta Kioku" (Japanese: 失われた記憶)	Yuki Sakamoto	Eiji Umehara	July 7, 2024
14	"Omen"; Transliteration: "Yochō" (Japanese: 予兆)	Shigeru Ueda	Daisuke Ishibashi	July 14, 2024
15	"Flapping Wings"; Transliteration: "Habataku Tsubasa" (Japanese: 羽ばたくつばさ)	Shinya Sadamitsu	Chiaki Nishinaka	July 21, 2024
16	"Incomplete Trio"; Transliteration: "Sorowanai Sannin" (Japanese: 揃わない3人)	Fumihiro Matsui	Kenichi Yamashita	July 28, 2024
17	"Cowardly Us"; Transliteration: "Kowagarina Bokura" (Japanese: こわがりな僕ら)	Masahito Otani	Asako Kuboyama	August 4, 2024
18	"Reason to Fight"; Transliteration: "Tatakau Riyū" (Japanese: 戦う理由)	Mitsuhiro Ōgata	Gigaemon Ichikawa	August 11, 2024
Special–2	"Battle Record"; Transliteration: "Tatakai no Kiroku" (Japanese: 戦いの記録)	Unknown	Unknown	August 18, 2024
19	"A New Encounter"; Transliteration: "Atarashī Deai" (Japanese: 新しい出会い)	Shinya Sadamitsu	Daisuke Ishibashi	August 25, 2024
20	"The Sea Driver"; Transliteration: "Umi no Untenshi" (Japanese: 海の運転士)	Shigeru Ueda	Kenichi Yamashita	September 1, 2024
21	"Shinkalion, Into the Sea"; Transliteration: "Shinkarion, umi e" (Japanese: シンカリオン、海へ)	Fumihiro Matsui	Kenichi Yamashita	September 8, 2024
22	"Culture Festival"; Transliteration: "Bunka-sai" (Japanese: 文化祭)	Shinya Sadamitsu	Chiaki Nishinaka	September 15, 2024
23	"Id and Morito"; Transliteration: "Ido to Morito" (Japanese: イドとモリト)	Tsubasa Obari	Asako Kuboyama	September 22, 2024
24	"Robotics and Humanity"; Transliteration: "Jinki to Jingi" (Japanese: 人機と仁義)	Masahiko Suzuki	Gigaemon Ichikawa	September 29, 2024
25	"Dream or Duty"; Transliteration: "Yume ka Shimei ka" (Japanese: 夢か使命か)	Shinya Sadamitsu	Gigaemon Ichikawa	October 6, 2024
26	"Recollection"; Transliteration: "Tsuioku" (Japanese: 追憶)	Shigeru Ueda	Eiji Umehara	October 13, 2024
27	"Collapse"; Transliteration: "Hōkai" (Japanese: 崩壊)	Fumihiro Matsui	Eiji Umehara	October 20, 2024
Special–3	"Research the World"; Transliteration: "Risāchi Za" (Japanese: リサーチ ザ ワールド)	Unknown	Unknown	October 27, 2024
28	"Morito's Feelings"; Transliteration: "Morito no Omoi" (Japanese: モリトの想い)	Sayaka Niwa	Daisuke Ishibashi	November 3, 2024
29	"From the Metaverse with AI"; Transliteration: "Metabāsu yori AI o komete" (Japanese: メタバースよりAIを込めて)	Shinya Sadamitsu	Daisuke Ishibashi	November 10, 2024
30	"Lamplight"; Transliteration: "Tomoshibi" (Japanese: 灯火)	Shigeru Ueda	Asako Kuboyama	November 17, 2024
31	"Despair Record"; Transliteration: "Zetsubō no Kiroku" (Japanese: 絶望の記録)	Masahito Otani; Sōta Kawano	Chiaki Nishinaka	November 24, 2024
32	"Pursuit"; Transliteration: "Tsuiseki" (Japanese: 追跡)	Fumihiro Matsui	Kenichi Yamashita	December 1, 2024
33	"Determination"; Transliteration: "Ketsui" (Japanese: 決意)	Shinya Sadamatsu	Gigaemon Ichikawa	December 8, 2024
34	"Things I'll Protect"; Transliteration: "Mamoritai Mono" (Japanese: 守りたいもの)	Shigeru Ueda	Gigaemon Ichikawa	December 15, 2024
35	"Truth"; Transliteration: "Shinsō" (Japanese: 真相)	Yuka Aoki	Eiji Umehara	December 22, 2024
36	"Each One's Own Path"; Transliteration: "Sorezore no Michi" (Japanese: それぞれの道)	Miyabi Inamori; Sayaka Niwa	Daisuke Ishibashi	December 29, 2024
Special–4	"Present the World"; Transliteration: "Purezen Za Wārudo" (Japanese: プレゼン ザ ワールド)	Fumihiro Matsui	Gigaemon Ichikara	January 5, 2025
37	"Vina and Taisei"; Transliteration: "Bīna to Taisei" (Japanese: ビーナとタイセイ)	Wei Weipeng	Kenichi Yamashita	January 12, 2025
38	"Connecting Thoughts"; Transliteration: "Tsunageru Omoi" (Japanese: 繋げる想い)	Fumihiro Matsui	Asako Kuboyama	January 26, 2025
39	"CHANGE THE WORLD"; Transliteration: "Chenji Za Wārudo" (Japanese: チェンジ ザ ワールド)	Shigeru Ueda	Eiji Umehara	February 2, 2025

=== Theatrical film ===
A film sequel to the anime, titled Shinkansen Henkei Robo Shinkalion the Movie: The Mythically Fast ALFA-X That Came From the Future (Japanese: 劇場版 新幹線変形ロボ シンカリオン 未来からきた神速のALFA-X, Hepburn: Gekijō-ban Shinkansen Henkei Robo Shinkarion Mirai Kara Kita Shinsoku no Arufaekkusu) premiered in cinemas in Japan on December 27, 2019.

=== Manga ===
A manga titled Shinkansen Henkei Robo Shinkalion: Dive the World (Japanese: 新幹線変形ロボ シンカリオン シンカリオン ダイブ ザ ワールド, Hepburn: Shinkansen Henkei Robo Shinkarion Daibu Za Wārudo) began serialization in Shueisha's Saikyō Jump on April 4, 2024. Mashino Sawazaki is credited for the original story with Kō Furuya as the illustrator.

A manga adaptation of Shinkalion: Change the World was announced on July 25, 2024, written and illustrated by Naoto Tsushima and began serialization on Kadokawa Shoten's Shōnen Ace Plus manga service on October 1 that same year.

==== Shinkansen Henkei Robo Shinkalion: Dive the World ====
No.	Release date	ISBN
1	December 4, 2024	978-4-08-884289-9

=== Video game ===
An arcade game based on the franchise, Shinkansen Henkei Robo Shinkalion: Get the Card! Super Evolution Battle (Japanese: 新幹線変形ロボ シンカリオン カードがもらえる! 超シンカバトル, Hepburn: Shinkansen Henkei Robo Shinkarion Kādo ga Moraeru! Chō Shinka Batoru) was developed and published by Takara-Tomy A.R.T.S and was released in March 2018 in Japan. Characters from the series also appeared in various mobile game crossovers, including Alien no Tamago by Paon DP and Sega's mobile RPG game Kotodaman. The series also debuted in Bandai Namco Entertainment's long running Super Robot Wars franchise, starting with Super Robot Wars X-Ω, and the series was officially introduced worldwide thanks to its appearance in Super Robot Wars 30 as DLC in the Expansion Pack as that game was the first licensed-IP based game to gain a worldwide release.

== Reception ==
The anime won the Best Award on Television Anime CG Category at the VFX-Japan Awards.

== See also ==
- Hikarian
