= Alex Shearer =

British novelist and scriptwriter (born 1949)

- Born: 25 June 1949 (age 77); Scotland
- Citizenship: UK
- Occupation: Writer
- Writing career
- Genre: Children's picture books Scripts

Alex Shearer (born 25 June 1949) is a British novelist and scriptwriter. He was born in Wick, in the north of Scotland. Alex Shearer sold his first TV script at the age of 29, after a varied career of some 30 odd jobs.

He wrote for television, film, theatre and radio (including plays and short stories for BBC Radio 4) for 14 years, and then devoted himself to becoming a novelist.

His 2003 novel The Speed of the Dark was shortlisted for the Guardian Children's Fiction Prize. The Greatest Store in the World was adapted into a television film by the BBC. His novel Bootleg was adapted for a television series by the BBC, and later adapted into manga and anime under its Japanese title Chocolate Underground.

== TV work ==
- Chalk and Cheese (1979) 6 episodes for Thames TV - featuring Michael Crawford. Based on a 1977 pilot, Spasms, also by Shearer, featuring Jonathan Pryce
- Sink or Swim (1980–82) 19 episodes for the BBC - a sitcom featuring Peter Davison and Robert Glenister
- Keep It in the Family (1981) 1 episode of Thames TV sitcom
- The Climber (1982) 6 episodes for the BBC - featuring Robin Nedwell
- The Front Line (1983) 6 episodes for the BBC - featuring Alan Igbon, filmed in St Pauls, Bristol
- The Lonelyhearts Kid (1984) 6 episodes for Thames TV - featuring Robert Glenister
- The Two of Us (1986–90) 32 episodes for LWT - featuring Nicholas Lyndhurst and Janet Dibley. Subsequently, re-made in Dutch and German
- All at No 20 (1986–87) Various episodes of Thames TV sitcom
- Slinger's Day (1986–87) 2 episodes of Thames TV sitcom
- No Job for a Lady (1990–92) 18 episodes for Thames TV - featuring Penelope Keith
- Close to Home (1990) 1 episode of LWT sitcom
- The Gingerbread Girl (1993) 7 episodes for Yorkshire TV - featuring Janet Dibley
- Law And Disorder (1994) 6 episodes for Thames TV - featuring Penelope Keith
- Delta Wave (1996) 2-part episode of a children's adventure series
- Wilmot (1999-2000) 13 episodes of children's series
- Bootleg (2002) 3-part children's drama for the BBC. BAFTA winner

== Radio work ==
- Flying The Flag 1985-1990, a series featuring Dinsdale Landen, 28 episodes. Radio 4.
- The Dream Maker 1992 - radio version of stage play. Also remade in Germany.
- The Diabolical Gourmet 2005 – Radio 4 Afternoon play
- Play Chopsticks For Me – Radio 4 Short story
- Getting A Life Radio 4 short story
- Bonding Radio 4 short story

== Film work ==
- The Greatest Store In The World 1999 (Bafta nomination)
- Play Chopsticks For Me 2000 – Short film
- Chocolate Underground 2008/9 Full length animated film version of novel BOOTLEG made by Japanese company MUSE. First full length animation to be streamed episodically to mobile phones and internet in 2008, followed by theatrical release. Premiered in Tokyo, January 2009.

== Stage work ==
- The Morning After - Bath Theatre
- One More Time - Chichester and tour of the South West.
- Out of the Blue - Chichester and Edinburgh.
- Standing Room Only Chichester.
- The Dream Maker - The Orchard Theatre Company, Barnstaple, tour of the South West
- A Time And A Season - Theatre Royal, Plymouth
- Harry In The Moonlight – Northcott Theatre, Exeter

== Novels ==
- The Dream Maker (1992)
- Professor Sniff and the Lost Spring Breezes (1996), Gollancz
- Wilmot and Chips (1996), Red Fox
- The Winter Brothers and the Missing Snow (1997), Puffin
- Dr. Twilite and the Autumn Snooze (1997), Puffin
- The Summer Sisters and the Dance Disaster (1997), Puffin
- Box 132 (1997), Harper Collins
- The Found (2005), Macmillan
- Wilmot and Pops (1998), Hodder
- The Greatest Store in the World (1999), Hodder
- The Great Blue Yonder (2002), Macmillan
- The Stolen (2002), Macmillan
- Sea Legs (2003), Hodder
- Bootleg (2003), Macmillan
- The Crush (2003)
- The Speed of the Dark (2004), Macmillan
- The Lost (2004), Macmillan
- The Fugitives (2004), Haddock
- The Great Switcheroonie (2006), Hodder
- The Hunted (2005), Macmillan
- I Was a Schoolboy Bridegroom (2006), Hodder
- Land Lubbers (2007), Hodder
- The Invisible Man's Socks (2007), Macmillan
- Tins (2007, released in the United States as Canned)
- The Cloud Hunters (2012), Hot Key
- Sky Run 2013 (Hot Key Books)
- This Is The Life 2014 (HarperCollins - Blue Door) ADULT
- The Ministry of Ghosts 2014 (Hot Key Books)
- A Message To The Sea 2016 (Piccadilly Press)
- A Message To The Sea – published France, Germany and Japan
