= The Lonelyhearts Kid =

- Genre: Sitcom
- Written by: Alex Shearer
- Directed by: Douglas Argent
- Starring: Robert Glenister; George Winter; Julia Goodman
- Country of origin: United Kingdom
- Original language: English
- No. of series: 1
- No. of episodes: 6

Production
- Producer: Anthony Parker
- Running time: 30 minutes
- Production company: Thames Television

Original release
- Network: ITV
- Release: 17 July – 21 August 1984

The Lonelyhearts Kid is a British television sitcom which was first broadcast on ITV in 1984. Produced by Thames Television, it consisted of one series of six half-hour episodes. After breaking up with his girlfriend Judy, Ken tries to find a new woman in his life.

Actors who appeared in individual episodes include Chris Ellison, Paul Chapman, Norman Mitchell, James Bree and Ray Winstone.

== Main cast ==
- Robert Glenister as Ken (6 episodes)
- George Winter as Ray (6 episodes)
- Julia Goodman as Ros (6 episodes)

== Episodes ==
No.	Title	Directed by	Written by	Original release date
1	"Old Acquaintance"	Douglas Argent	Alex Shearer	17 July 1984
2	"Fifty-Fifty"	Douglas Argent	Alex Shearer	24 July 1984
3	"Lessons to Forget"	Douglas Argent	Alex Shearer	31 July 1984
4	"A Cry for Help"	Douglas Argent	Alex Shearer	7 August 1984
5	"The Chat"	Douglas Argent	Alex Shearer	14 August 1984
6	"Desires of the Flesh"	Douglas Argent	Alex Shearer	21 August 1984

== Bibliography ==
- Christopher Perry. The British Television Pilot Episodes Research Guide 1936-2015. 2015.
