= Mitsuhisa Ishikawa =

Japanese anime producer

- 石川 光久
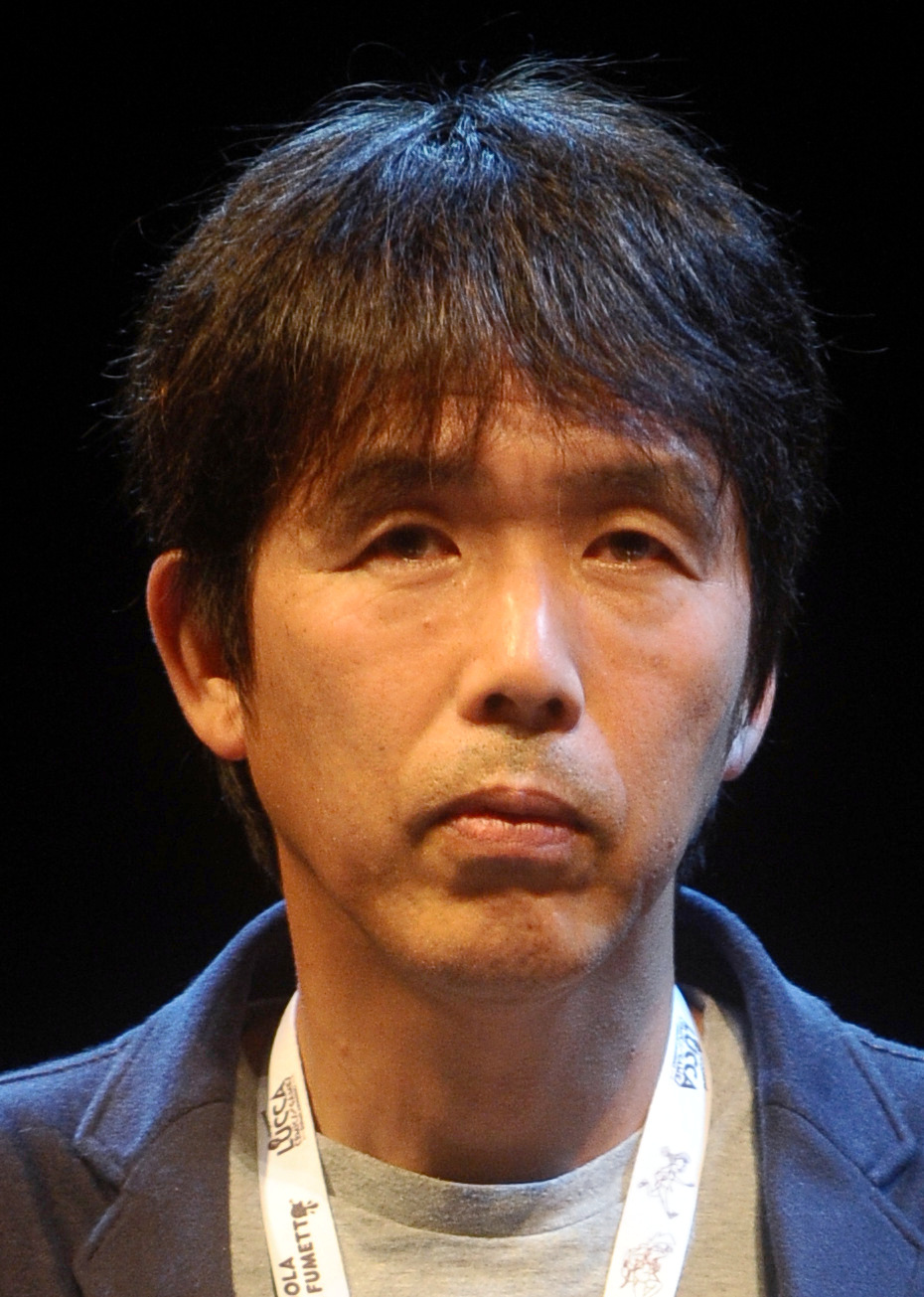
- Mitsuhisa Ishikawa in 2015
- Born: October 30, 1958 (age 67); Hachiōji, Tokyo, Japan
- Occupations: Anime executive producer; film producer; television producer; project developer; studio executive
- Years active: 1981-present
- Employers: Tatsunoko Production (1981–1987); Production I.G (1987–present)
- Known for: Founder of Production I.G
- Title: President of IG Port; Chairman of Production I.G
- Board member of: Non-executive director of Tatsunoko Production

Mitsuhisa Ishikawa (石川 光久, Ishikawa Mitsuhisa; born October 30, 1958) is a Japanese anime producer and planner, as well as the co-founder and current chairman of the anime studio Production I.G.

== Career ==
Mitsuhisa Ishikawa was an executive at Bee Train from 1997 to 2006,

Ishikawa acted as executive producer for the anime sequence The Origin of Ren in Kill Bill, and was the producer of the first two Ghost in the Shell films. In 2005, Ishikawa joined his first joint Japanese-U.S. collaboration, since the opening of the Production I.G branch in Los Angeles, IGPX: Immortal Grand Prix, a joint production with Production I.G and Cartoon Network. Ishikawa has also produced Batman: Gotham Knight, Halo Legends and Dante's Inferno: An Animated Epic.

Ishikawa is also one of the owners of Tatsunoko Productions and a part-time director.
