= Flying the Flag =

Radio sitcom set in a British embassy in the Eastern Bloc during the Cold War

- Genre: Comedy drama
- Running time: 30 minutes
- Country of origin: United Kingdom
- Language: English
- Home station: BBC Radio 4
- Starring: Dinsdale Landen; Peter Acre; Moir Leslie
- Created by: Alex Shearer
- Written by: Alex Shearer
- Produced by: Pete Atkin; Neil Cargill
- Original release: 20 April 1987 – 4 August 1992
- No. of series: 4
- No. of episodes: 28
- Audio format: Stereophonic sound

Flying the Flag is a BBC Radio 4 sitcom set in a British embassy in the Eastern Bloc during the Cold War. It ran for four series, aired from 1987 to 1992, which have been repeated numerous times.

== Synopsis ==
Created during the Cold War, this BBC Radio 4 sitcom chronicled the vagaries of diplomatic life in a fictitious eastern-bloc country. Dinsdale Landen starred as the British ambassador, with Peter Acre (as First Secretary William Frost) and Moir Leslie (as Helen Waterson, the embassy's typist and secretary) as his assistants, and Stephen Greif as the US ambassador.

Later series moved with the times as the country embraced perestroika.

== Cast ==
=== Regular Cast ===
- Her Majesty's Ambassador Mr McKenzie - Dinsdale Landen
- William Frost - Peter Acre
- Helen Waterson - Moir Leslie
- Spiro Wineberg, United States Ambassador - Stephen Greif
- Colonel Surikov - Christopher Benjamin

=== Production ===
- Writer - Alex Shearer
- Producer - Pete Atkin (s.1-2), Neil Cargill (s.3)

== Episode list ==
Series	Episode	Title	First broadcast	Additional cast
1	1	Favours	20 April 1987	Brown - Milton Johns, Bryant - Stuart Organ
1	2	Weather Problems	27 April 1987	Yakov Korovin - Michael Bilton, Mikhail Korovin - Jonathan Kydd
1	3	Notes From The Underground	4 May 1987	Yakov Korovin - Michael Bilton, Eugenia - Sue Broomfield
1	4	Compromising Positions	11 May 1987	Mrs Poonskey - Margaret Ward
1	5	Here In The Western World	18 May 1987	Yakov Korovin - Michael Bilton, Mikhail Korovin - Jonathan Kydd
1	6	Spy Story	25 May 1987	Mrs Newton - Susie Brann, George Summers - Peter Howell
2	1	The Bread And Butter	10 March 1988	Harris - Stephen Rashbrook
2	2	The Space Race	17 March 1988	Olaf - David Goodland
2	3	A Tooth For A Tooth	24 March 1988	
2	4	The Opium Of The People	31 March 1988	Morris - John Baddely
2	5	No Sudden Moves	7 April 1988	Keith - Richard Pearce
2	6	Political Flu	14 April 1988	Shelkov - Paul Gregory, Nesterov - Peter Craze
2	7	A Taste Of Democracy	21 April 1988	Frank Burton MP - Alan Dudley, Gerald Calder-Browne MP - Richard Tate
2	8	Submarine Diplomacy	28 April 1988	Captain Warner - David Goodland
3	1	Whose Rubbish Is It Anyway?	20 November 1990	
3	2	Our Own Correspondent	27 November 1990	Henry Treebling - John Grieve
3	3	The Comrade Connection	4 December 1990	
3	4	A Loss Of Marbles	11 December 1990	
3	5	Cool Heads	18 December 1990	Hutchins - Norman Bird
3	6	Cultural Exchange	25 December 1990	Grub - Julian Dutton
4	1	Spiritual Values	16 June 1992	
4	2	In Custody	23 June 1992	
4	3	As Unequal As Others	30 June 1992	
4	4	Little Extras	7 July 1992	Duncan Bridges - Peter Whitman
4	5	Endangered Species	14 July 1992	
4	6	No Special Treatment	21 July 1992	
4	7	The Pretenders	28 July 1992	Sharon - Elaine Lordan, Dave - Simon Schatzberger
4	8	End Of Term	4 August 1992	

== See also ==
- Ambassadors (TV series)
- epguides.com
- radiolistings.co.uk
