= Katsuji Morishita =

Japanese artist

Katsuji Morishita (森下 勝司, Morishita Katsuji) is a Japanese animation producer for Production I.G. He was responsible for overseeing the hand-drawn anime sequences in Kill Bill Volume 1. Morishita also produced an anime by the name of Dead Leaves. Currently, he's expected to be president of new I.G Port animation subsidiary, SIGNAL.MD.
