= The Front Line (British TV series) =

- Created by: Alex Shearer
- Written by: Alex Shearer
- Directed by: Roger Race
- Starring: Paul Barber; Alan Igbon
- Country of origin: United Kingdom
- No. of series: 1
- No. of episodes: 6

Production
- Producer: Roger Race
- Running time: 30 minutes

Original release
- Network: BBC1
- Release: 6 December 1984 – 17 January 1985

The Front Line is a British television sitcom about two half-brothers of West Indian descent who shared a house, one brother a policeman and one a dreadlocked Rastafarian. The show was originally broadcast on BBC1 between December 1984 and January 1985.

The series starred Paul Barber as the elder, policeman brother Malcolm, and Alan Igbon as the younger brother Sheldon. It was written by Alex Shearer, filmed in Bristol and Cardiff, and transmitted between 6 December 1984 and 17 January 1985. A pilot for the series, On The Frontline, was broadcast in the 1970s.

The theme tune to the series was written and performed by Black Roots, and the opening credits of the show featured the band performing the song.
