= Signal.MD =

Japanese animation studio

Signal.MD, Inc.
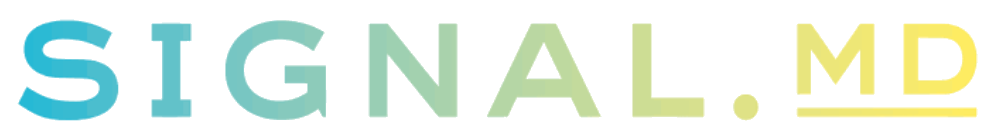
- Native name: 株式会社シグナル・エムディ
- Romanized name: Kabushiki-gaisha Shigunaru Emudi
- Company type: Kabushiki gaisha
- Industry: Japanese animation
- Founded: October 1, 2014; 11 years ago
- Defunct: June 1, 2025; 12 months ago
- Headquarters: Nakamachi, Musashino, Tokyo, Japan
- Key people: Takatoshi Chino (president)
- Parent: IG Port
- Website: www.signal-md.co.jp

Signal.MD, Inc. (Japanese: 株式会社シグナル・エムディ, Hepburn: Kabushiki-gaisha Shigunaru Emudi) was a Japanese animation studio founded on October 1, 2014, by Production I.G holding company IG Port. The studio was dissolved in June 2025, but continues to operate as an internal brand and team within Production I.G.

== Establishment ==
On September 22, 2014, IG Port announced it was forming a new animation studio named SIGNAL.MD. Production I.G board member Katsuji Morishita was appointed as president of the company.

== History ==
IG Port announced on January 24, 2025 that its consolidated company Production I.G would absorb Signal.MD on June 1, 2025. The studio was dissolved.

== Works ==
=== TV series ===
- Tantei Team KZ's Jiken Note (2015–2016)
- Atom: The Beginning (2017, co-animated with OLM and Production I.G)
- Recovery of an MMO Junkie (2017)
- Hashiri Tsuzukete Yokattatte. (2018)
- FLCL Progressive (2018, episode 5)
- Hanakappa (2019–2021; taken over from Xebec and co-animated with OLM)
- Kedama no Gonjirō (2020, co-animated with OLM and Wit Studio; joined halfway)
- Dragon Goes House-Hunting (2021)
- Mars Red (2021)
- Platinum End (2021–2022)
- The Fire Hunter (2023–2024)
- Go! Go! Vehicle Zoo (2023, co-animated with OLM)
- Kizuna no Allele (2023, co-animated with Wit Studio)
- Shinkalion: Change the World (2024, co-animated with Production I.G)
- Nina the Starry Bride (2024)
- Hana-Kimi (2026)
- Eren the Southpaw (2026, co-animated with Production I.G)

=== OVAs ===
- Yuuna and the Haunted Hot Springs (2020)

=== Films ===
- Colorful Ninja Iromaki (2016)
- Cyborg 009: Call of Justice (2016, co-animated with OLM)
- Napping Princess (2017)
- Birthday Wonderland (2019)
- Kimi dake ni Motetainda (2019)
- Fate/Grand Order - Divine Realm of the Round Table: Camelot ~ Wandering; Agaterám ~ (2020, animation production for first film)
- Words Bubble Up Like Soda Pop (2021, co-animated with Sublimation)
- Deemo: Memorial Keys (2022, co-animated with Production I.G)

== Notable staff ==
=== Representatives ===
- Katsuji Morishita (President, 2014–2022)
- Takatoshi Chino (President, 2022–2025; board member, 2018–2022)
- Juurou Sugimura (Board member, 2014–2018)
- George Wada (Board member, 2014–2016)
- Toshiaki Okuno (Auditor, 2014–2023)
