= Production I.G =

Japanese animation studio

Production I.G., Inc.
- Logo used since 1993

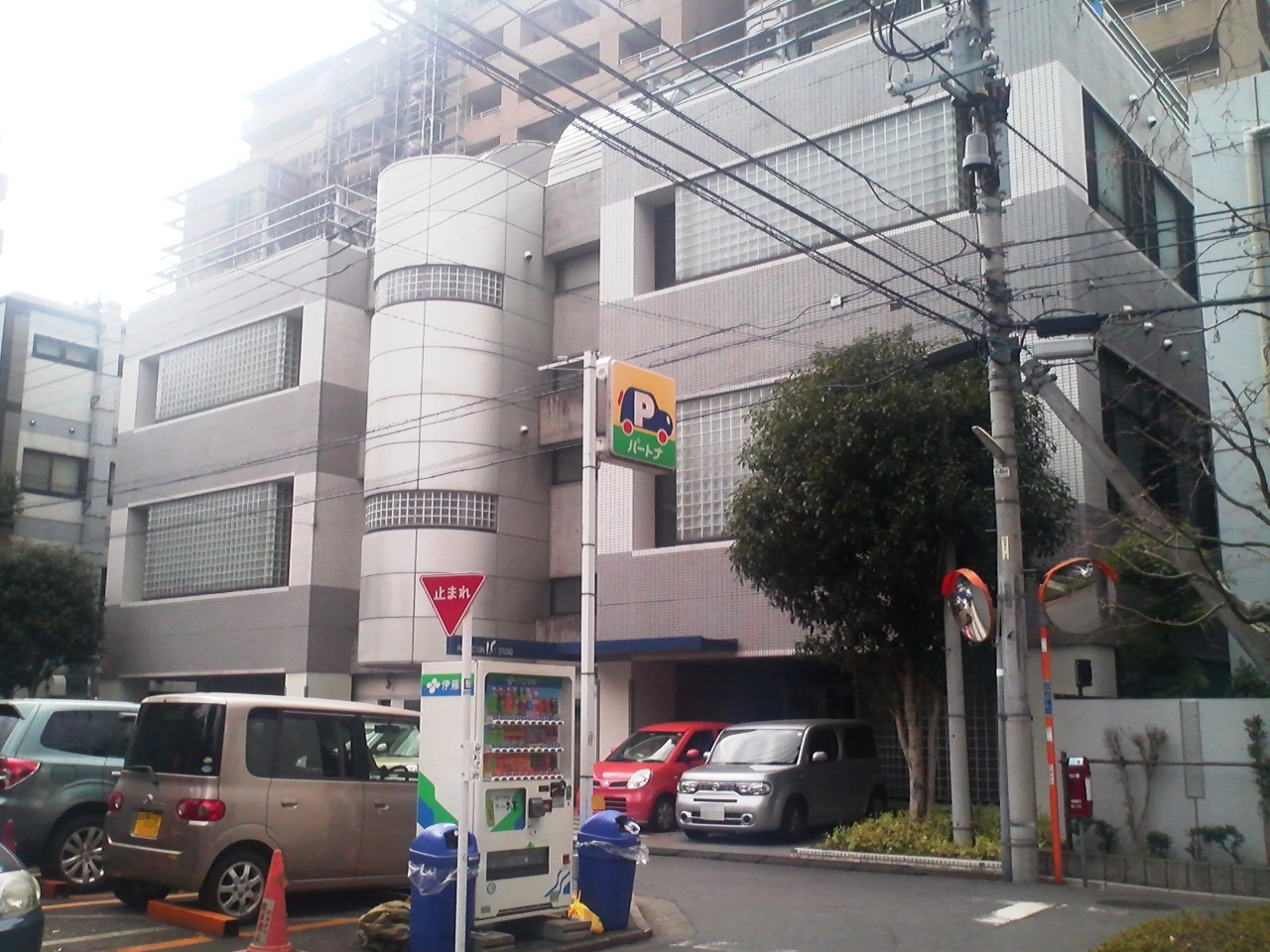
- Headquarters in Musashino, Tokyo
- Native name: 株式会社プロダクション・アイジー
- Romanized name: Kabushiki-gaisha Purodakushon Ai Jī
- Formerly: I.G Tatsunoko Limited (1987–1993)
- Type: Kabushiki gaisha
- Industry: Animation; Feature film; Television; Video games
- Founded: December 15, 1987; 38 years ago (studio); November 1, 2007; 19 years ago (company)
- Founders: Mitsuhisa Ishikawa; Takayuki Goto
- Headquarters: Nakacho, Musashino, Tokyo, Japan
- Area served: Worldwide
- Key people: Mitsuhisa Ishikawa (chairman); George Wada (president and CEO)
- Products: Animated films; Animated TV programs; OVA; ONA; Video games
- Number of employees: 334 (As of June 2025)
- Parent: Tatsunoko Production (1987–1990); ING (1990–2000); IG Port (2007–present)
- Divisions: I.G Digital; I.G3D; Production I.G Niigata; Production I.G USA
- Website: production-ig.co.jp

Production I.G., Inc. (Japanese: 株式会社プロダクション・アイジー, Hepburn: Kabushiki-gaisha Purodakushon Ai Jī) is a Japanese animation studio. Headquartered in Musashino, Tokyo, Production I.G was founded on December 15, 1987, by producer Mitsuhisa Ishikawa and character designer Takayuki Goto as I.G Tatsunoko, a branch studio of the animation giant Tatsunoko Production, changing its name to the current Production I.G in September 1993. The letters I and G derive from the names of the company founders.

Since 2007, Production I.G is a subsidiary of the IG Port holding company, causing a restructuring which led to the second incarnation of the studio being formed. Ishikawa was president and CEO of the studio until August 2022 when that position was given to George Wada with Ishikawa remaining as chairman of the company.

Production I.G went through a number of structural changes, not only stepping up from subcontractor to prime contractor to financier of animation production, but also changing the very scheme of the animation business in Japan. The studio has implemented a series of measures that break with industry norms, such as investing in productions that are unprecedented for an animation studio, entering the copyright business, establishing a finance company, establishing overseas subsidiaries, and negotiating directly with major Hollywood movie studios. The studio established a holding company, IG Port, which owns Production I.G itself as well as animation studios Wit Studio. And the studio has continued to change and expand its business format, merging with publisher Mag Garden, establishing electronic content distribution company Lingua Franca, and forming a comprehensive business alliance with Netflix.

Since its inception, Production I.G has produced many of Japan's leading creators, including Mamoru Oshii and Kenji Kamiyama. It has also produced a number of acclaimed feature films, television series, OVAs (Original Video Animations), ONAs (Original Net Animations), and video games. Its representative works include the Ghost in the Shell series, the Psycho-Pass series, Blood: The Last Vampire and its derivative works such as Blood+, the animation sequences of Kill Bill Vol. 1, Eden of the East, Guilty Crown, Kuroko's Basketball, and Haikyu!! It is also known in the video game industry for developing intros, cut-scenes and artwork for games such as Bandai Namco's Tales series. Furthermore, it has also spawned such influential animation studios as Wit Studio and Signal.MD, and its influence on the Japanese animation industry is immeasurable.

Production I.G's works have received critical acclaim outside of Japan, with Mamoru Oshii's Ghost in the Shell (Note: It would spawn a media franchise.) reaching #1 on the U.S. Billboard Top Video Sales Charts in 1996, and Ghost in the Shell 2: Innocence was the first Japanese animation film to be nominated in Competition at the Cannes Film Festival. Hiroyuki Okiura's Jin-Roh: The Wolf Brigade and Hiroyuki Kitakubo's Blood: The Last Vampire have also been highly acclaimed. Those works have also influenced famous Hollywood creators. As a result, it was decided that The Matrix, directed by Lana and Lilly Wachowski, would be produced, and Production I.G produced the animation sequences for Quentin Tarantino's Kill Bill Vol. 1. When pitching the idea for The Matrix to producer Joel Silver, The Wachowskis showed him Ghost in the Shell and told him they wanted to make a similar film. Tarantino liked Blood: The Last Vampire so much that he himself visited the studio and asked I.G to participate in the production of the film. (Note: Gogo Yubari in a sailor suit wielding a Japanese sword was inspired by the film's main character Saya.) However, I.G was preoccupied and in no condition to accept, so Ishikawa initially declined. Tarantino then began sending unsolicited drafts of screenplays to the studio one after another. As Ishikawa read them, he gradually became interested and eventually accepted the request.

== History ==
On December 15, 1987, Mitsuhisa Ishikawa, a producer at Tatsunoko Production, established IG Tatsunoko Ltd., the predecessor of Production IG, with Takayuki Goto, who had organized Studio Chime. It was in the form of an independent Tatsunoko production branch led by the staff who participated in the Tatsunoko-produced TV series Zillion. Japan was experiencing a booming economy at that time thanks to the economic bubble, but it was a difficult time for the animation industry to create new anime. Original animation projects that may or may not be successful were particularly difficult to pass, and there were few opportunities for young talent to demonstrate their abilities. Ishikawa therefore planned Zillion to provide them with a place to play an active role. Ishikawa, already a freelancer, was entrusted with the work as a Tatsunoko Production branch separated from the company. Takashi Nakamura, Kōichi Mashimo, Takayuki Goto (later Production I.G board member), Hiroyuki Okiura and Kazuchika Kise (later Production I.G board member) who were at Anime R and Mu in Osaka at the time, as well as Mizuho Nishikubo and Mamoru Oshii helped in the production. Kyoto Animation also participated in the production. After Zillion, he could have disbanded the team, but he sensed that everyone wanted to continue working together with this group, so he started I.G Tatsunoko. The company was formed by merging the Zillion production team and Studio Chime, which was run by Takayuki Goto, who designed its characters, with the cooperation of Kyoto Animation. Animator Kazuchika Kise also joined the studio early on. Hideaki Hatta, President and CEO of Kyoto Animation, who encouraged Ishikawa to become president, supported him in establishing the company and even invested in it. The company name "I.G" was named by Takayuki Goto, after the initials "I" of Ishikawa, the head of the production team, and "G" of Goto, the head of the animation studio. It was Ishikawa's idea to put Tatsunoko in the company name because he thought it would make it easier to get work and out of consideration for Tatsunoko, which had trained him. The company name was changed to Production I.G in 1993.

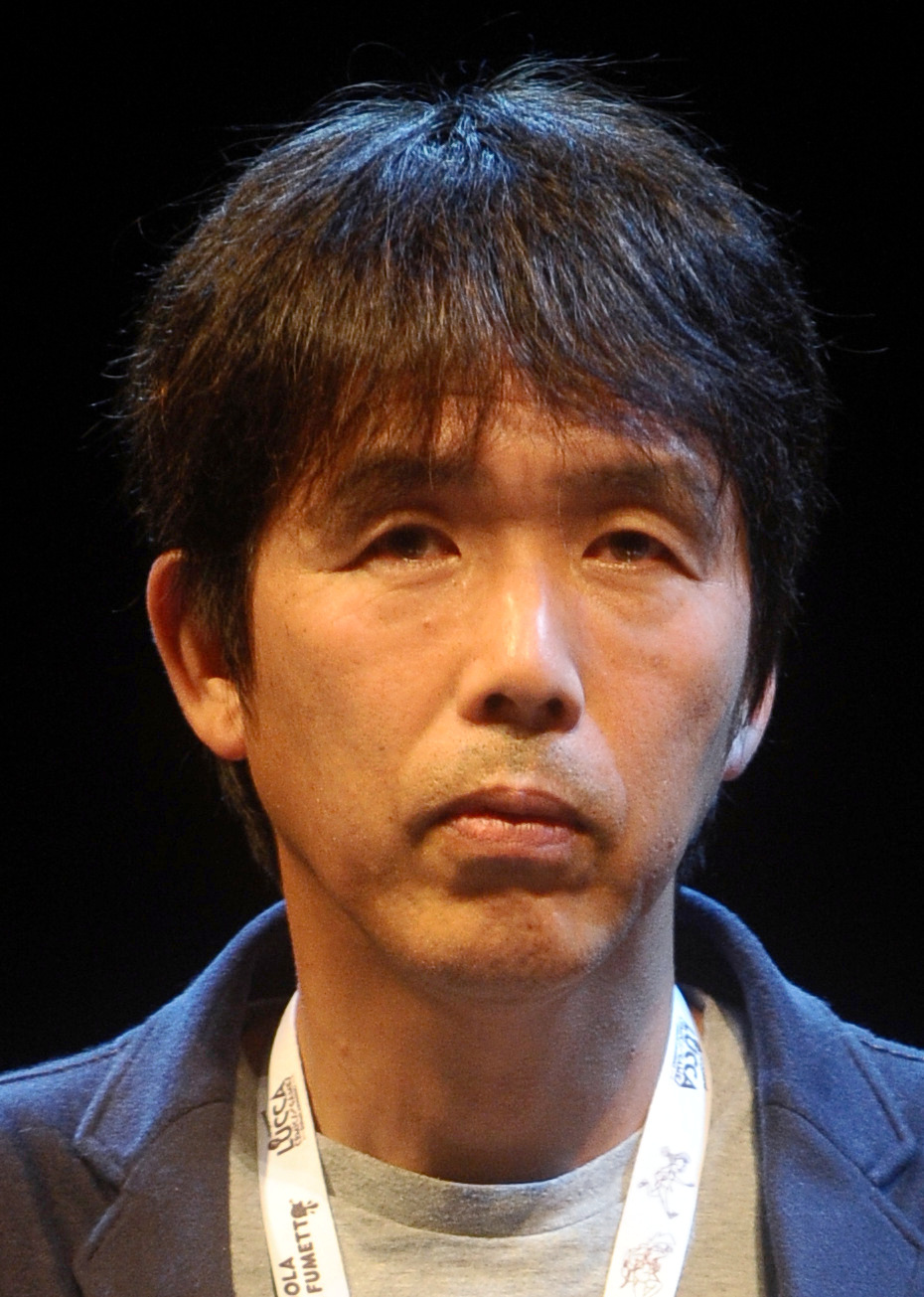
Founder Mitsuhisa Ishikawa in 2015

After becoming independent, I.G's work was mainly subcontracted to other studios for a while. Soon after becoming independent, I.G received an offer from Studio Deen to subcontract the production of Mamoru Oshii's Patlabor OVA and the movie, and with these hits, I.G solidified its position in the industry. However, Ishikawa began to feel dissatisfied with the fact that even though his company, a subcontractor, actually produced the works, it was only credited as a production partner in the end credits, while the name of the main contractor came to the forefront, and he also began to think that the studio would not be able to survive on low-budget subcontract work in the future. Ishikawa therefore founded Ing Co., Ltd. in 1990, a planning and production company that handles copyright business. In the anime industry, studios cannot make a profit if they only subcontract production. Ishikawa therefore established Ing with the idea of earning income not only from anime production but also from copyrights, and the studio invested in its works. During his time at Tatsunoko Productions, Ishikawa had seen how the company generate revenue through the operation of the copyrights for original works, so he decided to follow suit. However, he chose a name that was as unobtrusive as possible and not reminiscent of I.G, so as not to alarm the large companies that were already in the copyright business. For Patlabor, Production I.G was a subcontractor for the first film in 1989, but was promoted to prime company for the second film in 1993, and even invested in the film. After that, Ishikawa continued to use Ing as a company responsible for matters related to contracts and funding, and invested in I.G works under the Ing name. Neon Genesis Evangelion was the only non-I.G studio's work that Ing invested in, and Ishikawa said that investing in this blockbuster work turned out to be a very good result for the studio.

Production I.G produced the film Ghost in the Shell, which was released in Japan in 1995. When this video was released in the U.S., it was ranked No. 1 in the U.S. Billboard magazine's Sell Video category in 1996, and the studio became known as one of the top animation studios in the world, both in name and reality. The film would go on to spawn a Ghost in the Shell franchise that includes sequel and reboot films, television series, original video animation, and original net animation. Ishikawa says this work was the biggest turning point for the studio. In Japanese anime production, manufacturers which are involved in the manufacturing, sale and distribution of video software, television stations, publishers and advertising agencies form a production committee, and animation studios generally join after the committee is formed. Since this would not be profitable enough for the studio, Ishikawa decided that the studio needed to move from being the one who was given permission to produce works to being the one who had the right to grant permission. He approached Kodansha, the publisher of the original Ghost in the Shell manga, and obtained permission to produce three forms of production: an anime TV series, a movie, and a video game. Since Production I.G has a direct contract with Kodansha for the rights to produce anime adaptations from the original manga, it is able to take the initiative when forming the production committee, including the ability to issue usage licenses to each of the participating companies. This allows Production I.G to develop a wide range of Ghost in the Shell anime franchises, including animation TV series, games, and movies. Ishikawa's decision was successful and brought in a fairly large amount of money for Production I.G, and the studio subsequently expanded its activities. After that, Production I.G began to get involved in the copyright business and grew into a company that was not just a production company, but also an investor. In the 2004 film Ghost in the Shell 2: Innocence, Ishikawa took a major risk to change the scheme of the Japanese animation business. He planned to make Production I.G, which had become a prime contractor and could invest somewhat, but was still just an animation production company, cut into a client position previously dominated by TV stations, publishing companies, and advertising agencies. Traditionally, it has been common knowledge that once an animation studio produces and delivers a work and receives payment for it, its relationship with the work ends, and any further profits are monopolized by the publishing company, television station, or advertising agency that has invested in the work and holds the copyrights. Anime studios need a lot of money to continue to produce high-quality works and to pay their animators, directors, and other staff appropriately, but it was impossible to do so under such conditions. Therefore, Ishikawa decided to become an investor. Ishikawa decided to produce Ghost in the Shell 2: Innocence on the studio's own, rather than relying on the publisher or other companies in Japan. In order to obtain production financing from major Hollywood film companies, he and Director Oshii traveled to the U.S. with a screenplay and negotiated directly with them without going through a major Japanese advertising agency. Ishikawa narrowed down the list of negotiating partners to DreamWorks, Warner Bros., and 20th century Fox, and finally signed a contract with DreamWorks, founded by Steven Spielberg, and succeeded in raising a huge amount of money and securing a promise of worldwide distribution. On the other hand, advertising and publicity in Japan was entrusted to Toshio Suzuki, a producer at Studio Ghibli. Suzuki's power made possible a large-scale advertising campaign that I.G. would not have been able to carry out alone, but it also created some difficulties. Ishikawa's strategy was to first work with a major global distributor to make Ghost in the Shell 2 a hit in the U.S., where the first Ghost in the Shell video sold well, and then import it back to Japan, but Suzuki rejected this. He suggested that the film be a hit in Japan before the rest of the world and that the studio forget about the success of the previous film and make it not as a sequel but as a completely new film. As a result, the Japanese title was changed from Ghost in the Shell 2 to Innocence. Furthermore, most of the investors have changed from the original lineup. This was an unthinkable situation, and the project could have been scrapped, but Ishikawa was able to renegotiate the contract with his remarkable negotiating skills.

In May 1995, Production I.G established a subsidiary studio, Xebec. In 1997, Production I.G invested in Bee Train, a studio founded by Kōichi Mashimo, and also established Production I.G., LLC, an overseas subsidiary based in Los Angeles. The company co-developed and co-produced the television series IGPX, directed by Mitsuru Hongo, with Cartoon Network in 2005. This was the first collaboration between an American cable network and a Japanese anime studio.

Production I.G was recapitalized and became a joint-stock company from a limited company in April 1998, and merged with Ing in September 2000.

In 2000, Production I.G produced the movie Blood: The Last Vampire, the first full-digital animation in Japan. This was the first time for Production I.G to acquire the original rights to a work.

In the 2000s, Production I.G began to produce more TV series, especially those based on popular manga series published in magazines such as Shōnen Jump. This was the result of Ishikawa's focus on creating a business scheme and leaving the animation production site to younger staff and producers, giving priority to their wishes.

In 2004, Bee Train acquired the shares held by Production I.G and ceased to be an equity method affiliate of Production I.G. Mitsuhisa Ishikawa also resigned from Bee Train's board.

In 2005, Production I.G. Inc. went public on the JASDAQ stock exchange. With the funds raised through the IPO, Production I.G founded a new studio capable of producing the latest 3DCG animation at the time, and co-founded FILM LIP, a studio capable of digital editing, with Fuji Television.

In 2007, Production I.G, Inc. changed its trade name to IG Port Inc. and at the same time established a new subsidiary under the name Production I.G. Inc. The company name and its function as an anime studio were taken over by the subsidiary, and the listing was maintained under the name IG Port. Mitsuhisa Ishikawa was also the representative director of Production I.G and IG Port. In the same year, IG Port acquired Mag Garden, a publisher specializing in comics, which publishes the monthly Comic Blade, as a subsidiary. The norm in the animation industry is for anime studios to obtain permission from major publishers such as Shueisha, Kodansha, Shogakukan, and Kadokawa to adapt popular manga into anime, and then produce anime adaptations based on the original manga. Because of this, none of the animation studios wanted to have a publishing division, but Mag Garden was the perfect publisher for Production I.G to add to its group because it was not large enough to make those major publishers wary or hostile.

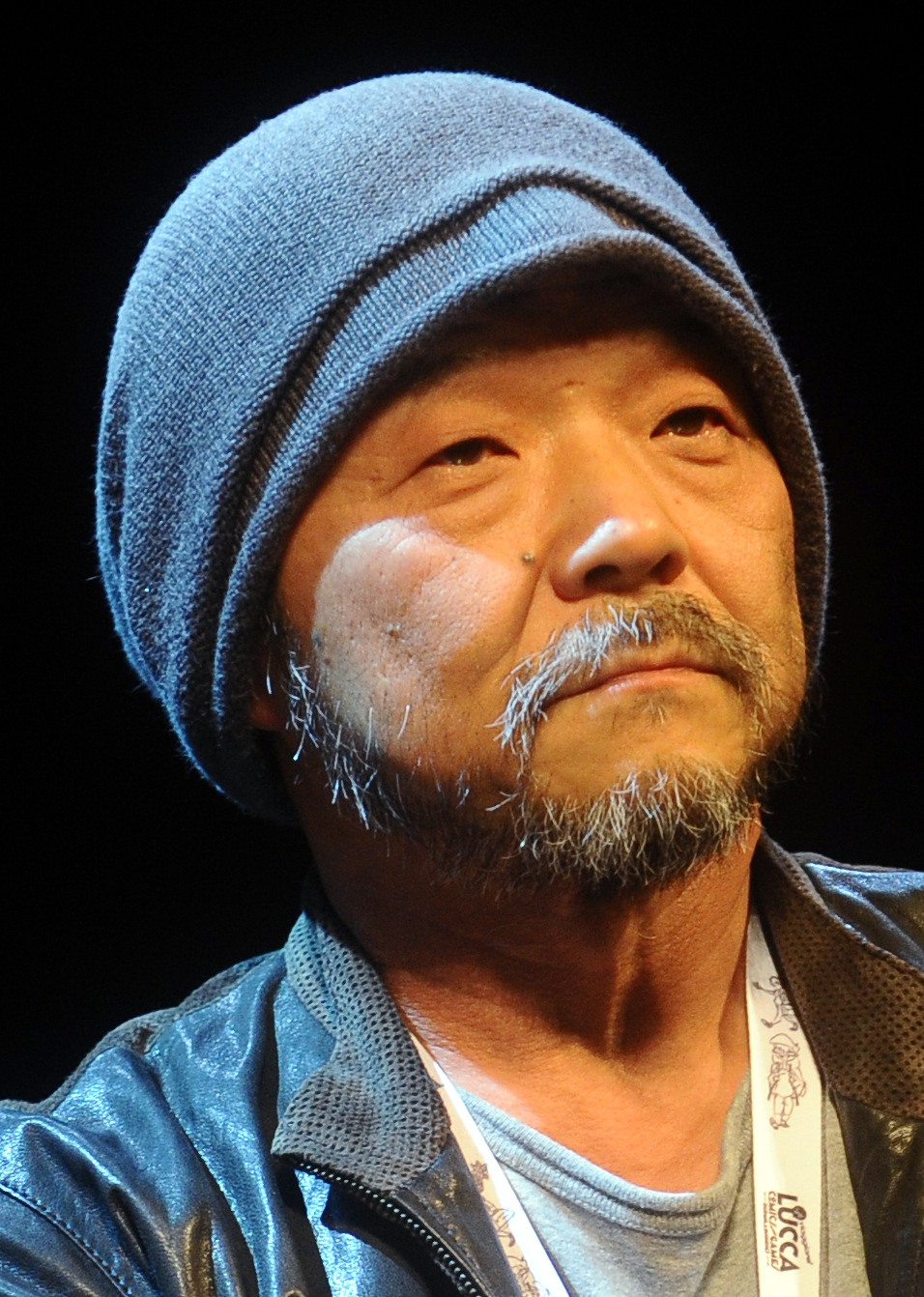
Frequent collaborator Mamoru Oshii in 2015

In September 2010, Production I.G moved its headquarters to Musashino, Tokyo.

In 2010, IG Port acquired an 11.2% stake in Tatsunoko Production and Mitsuhisa Ishikawa became a non-executive director of the company.

On June 1, 2012, Wit Studio, I.G's subsidiary animation studio, was founded, with the studio's first project being Attack on Titan, which I.G assisted in producing. IG Port invested 66.6%, while George Wada and Tetsuya Nakatake who were in the planning section of Production I.G invested 21.6% and 10.0%, respectively.

In 2017, IG Port created Lingua Franca, an electronic distribution service company, as a wholly owned subsidiary, with Kyohei Shinpuku (Note: He was the editor of hit manga at Mag Garden, including The Ancient Magus' Bride and The Girl from the Other Side: Siúil, a Rún.) as its president.

On June 5, 2017, Production I.G launched Tate Anime (vertical anime), an anime distribution app optimized for viewing on smartphones. It was completely renewed in 2018 and replaced with a new app, Anime Beans, with expanded functions, including the ability to deliver Yoko anime (horizontal anime), and more content available for viewing. The service was launched on December 18 worldwide except for China. The app ended service on March 31, 2023.

In 2018, Production I.G and Wit Studio entered into a comprehensive business partnership with Netflix for anime productions.

On November 20, 2018, IG Port sold Xebec to Sunrise. Prior to that, Xebeczwei, a subsidiary of Xebec, was transferred to Production I.G on January 12, 2018, becoming a subsidiary and changing its name to IGzwei accordingly.

On August 30, 2022, George Wada, who founded Wit Studio, was promoted from Executive Vice President of Production I.G to CEO, while Ishikawa resigned as CEO to become Chairman. Wada also continued to serve as president of Wit Studio.

== Works ==
=== Television series ===
Year	Title	Directors	Eps.	Notes	Refs.
1994–1995	Blue Seed	Jun Kamiya	26	Based on the manga series by Yuzo Takada. Produced with Ashi Productions.	
2001–2002	Vampiyan Kids	Masatsugu Arakawa	26 (Note: Three episodes were released exclusively on DVD.)	Original work.	
2001–2002	PaRappa the Rapper	Hiroaki Sakurai	30	Based on the video game of the same name. Production co-operation with J.C. Staff.	
2002–2005	Ghost in the Shell: Stand Alone Complex	Kenji Kamiyama	52 (Note: Two original video animations were released. Ghost in the Shell: Stand Alone Complex – The Laughing Man was released on September 23, 2005. Ghost in the Shell: Stand Alone Complex – Individual Eleven was released on January 27, 2006.)	Second season titled Ghost in the Shell: S.A.C. 2nd Gig ran for 26 episodes from 2004 to 2005.	
2003–2004	Cromartie High School	Hiroaki Sakurai	26	Based on the manga series by Eiji Nonaka.	
2004–2005	Windy Tales	Junji Nishimura	13	Original story by Minami Otori.	
2004–2005	Otogi Zoshi	Mizuho Nishikubo	26	Original work.	
2005–2006	IGPX: Immortal Grand Prix	Mitsuru Hongo	26	Collaborative project with Cartoon Network.	
2005–2006	Blood+	Junichi Fujisaku	50	Original work.	
2006–2007	Le Chevalier D'Eon	Kazuhiro Furuhashi	24	Based on an original story by Tow Ubukata.	
2006–2008	xxxHolic	Tsutomu Mizushima	37 (Note: Three original video animations were released on DVD. xxxHolic: Shunmuki was released on February 18, 2009. xxxHolic: Rō and xxxHolic: Rō Adayume in 2009.)	Based on the manga by the group Clamp. Ran for two seasons for a total of 37 episodes.	
2007	Moribito: Guardian of the Spirit	Kenji Kamiyama	26	Based on the novel by Nahoko Uehashi.	
2007	Reideen	Mitsuru Hongo	26	Remake of TV series Brave Reideen.	
2007	Ani*Kuri15	Mamoru Oshii (Note: Episode PROJECT_MERMAID); Atsushi Takeuchi (Note: Episode Wandaba Kiss)	15	15 episode series with Production I.G producing two episodes.	
2007–2008	Ghost Hound	Ryūtarō Nakamura	22	Original work created with Masamune Shirow.	
2008	Library War	Takayuki Hamana	12 (Note: An original video animation (OVA) was released on Blu-ray on December 22, 2010.)	Based on the light novel series by Hiro Arikawa.	
2008	Real Drive	Kazuhiro Furuhashi	26	Original work created with Masamune Shirow.	
2008	Sands of Destruction (Note: Also known as World Destruction.)	Shunsuke Tada	13	Based on the video game of the same name.	
2009	Erin	Takayuki Hamana	50	Based on the novel by Nahoko Uehashi.	
2009	Eden of the East	Kenji Kamiyama	11	Original work.	
2009–2010	Sengoku Basara: Samurai Kings	Itsuro Kawasaki (Note: Season 1); Kazuya Nomura (Note: Season 2)	24	Based on the Capcom video game series of the same name. Ran for two seasons.	
2009–2024	Kimi ni Todoke	Hiro Kaburagi (Note: Seasons 1–2); Kenichi Matsuzawa (Note: Season 3)	43	Based on the manga by Karuho Shiina.	
2010	Shoka (Note: The Calligrapher in English.)	Makoto Yamada	1	Based on a script written by Kenji Saido who won the grand prize at the 7th Animax Award in 2008.	
2011	Moshidora	Takayuki Hamana	10	Based on the novel by Natsumi Iwasaki.	
2011	Bunny Drop	Kanta Kamei	11	Based on the manga by Yumi Unita.	
2011	Blood-C	Tsutomu Mizushima	12	Original work, Created in collaboration with Clamp.	
2011–2013	You're Being Summoned, Azazel	Tsutomu Mizushima	26 (Note: Four original video animations (OVA) were released on DVD. On February 23, 2010, September 22, 2010, May 23, 2012 and June 23, 2014.)	Based on the manga by Yasuhisa Kubo. Ran for two 13-episode seasons.	
2011–2012	Guilty Crown	Tetsuro Araki	22	Original work.	
2012–2015	Kuroko's Basketball	Shunsuke Tada	75 (Note: Three original video animations (OVA) were released on Blu-ray and DVD as bonus episodes. Episode 22.5 on February 22, 2013, episode 41.5 on June 20, 2014 and episode 75.5 on December 24, 2015. Three compilation films were released in 2016.)	Based on the manga by Tadatoshi Fujimaki. Ran for three 25-episode seasons.	
2012	The Prince of Tennis II	Hideyo Yamamoto	13	Based on the manga by Takeshi Konomi, the sequel to The Prince of Tennis. Produced with M.S.C.	
2012	Shining Hearts	Itsuro Kawasaki	12	Based on the video game of the same name.	
2012–2013	Robotics;Notes	Kazuya Nomura	22	Based on the visual novel by Mages.	
2012–2013	Psycho-Pass	Katsuyuki Motohiro (Note: General Director); Naoyoshi Shiotani (Note: Director)	22	Original work.	
2012–2013	Gargantia on the Verdurous Planet	Kazuya Murata	13 (Note: Four original video animations (OVA) were released on Blu-ray. Two in August and October 2013. Two in November 2014 and May 2015.)	Original work.	
2013	Genshiken: Second Generation	Tsutomu Mizushima	13	Genshiken Nidaime in Japanese. Based on the manga by Shimoku Kio.	
2013–2016	Ace of Diamond	Mitsuyuki Masuhara	126 (Note: Five original video animations (OVA) were released as bonus episodes on Blu-ray. Two episodes in March 2018 and three episodes in June 2018.)	Based on the manga by Yuji Terajima. Co-production with Madhouse with Production I.G working on two seasons. Season 1 ran for 75 episodes 2013–2015. Season 2 ran for 51 episodes 2015–2016.	
2014–2020	Haikyu!!	Susumu Mitsunaka (Note: Seasons 1–3); Masako Sato (Note: Season 4)	85 (Note: Four original video animations (OVA) were released on Blu-ray and DVD: one on March 4, 2015 one on August 4, 2017 and two on January 22, 2020. Four compilation films were released: two on July 3 and September 18, 2015 and two on September 15 and September 29, 2017.)	Based on the manga by Haruichi Furudate. Seasons 1–2 ran for 25 episodes 2014–2016. Season 3 ran for 10 episodes in 2016. Season 4 ran for 25 episodes in 2020.	
2014	Ao Haru Ride	Ai Yoshimura	12	Based on the manga by Io Sakisaka.	
2015	Maria the Virgin Witch	Gorō Taniguchi	12	Based on the manga by Masayuki Ishikawa.	
2015	Ghost in the Shell: Arise – Alternative Architecture	Kazuchika Kise	10	TV version of the four-part original video animation (OVA) titled Ghost in the Shell: Arise that was shown in theaters in 2013 and 2014.	
2015	Attack on Titan: Junior High	Yoshihide Ibata	12	Based on the manga by Saki Nakagawa that was itself based on the original manga by Hajime Isayama.	
2015–2017	Pikaia!	Daiki Tomiyasu	26	Production with OLM and NHK. Ran for two 13-episode seasons: Season 1 in 2015 and Season 2 in 2017.	
2016	Joker Game	Kazuya Nomura	12	Based on the novel series by Koji Yanagi.	
2017	Atom: The Beginning	Tatsuo Sato; Katsuyuki Motohiro (Note: General director)	12	Based on the manga by Tetsurō Kasahara. Co-production with OLM and Signal.MD.	
2017	Welcome to the Ballroom	Yoshimi Itazu	24	Based on the manga by Tomo Takeuchi.	
2017	Magical Circle Guru Guru	Hiroshi Ikehata	24	Based on the manga by Hiroyuki Etō.	
2018	Legend of the Galactic Heroes: Die Neue These	Shunsuke Tada	12	Based on the novels by Yoshiki Tanaka.	
2018	FLCL Progressive	Katsuyuki Motohiro (Note: Chief director); Yutaka Uemura (Alternative)	6	Second season of FLCL. Produced in collaboration with Adult Swim.	
2018	FLCL Alternative	Katsuyuki Motohiro; Yutaka Uemura (Alternative)	6	Third season of FLCL. Produced in collaboration with Adult Swim and general animation production by NUT and Revoroot.	
2018	Run with the Wind	Kazuya Nomura	23	Based on the novel by Shion Miura.	
2019–2020	Case File nº221: Kabukicho	Ai Yoshimura	24 (Note: A six-part original video animation (OVA) was released on August 26, 2020.)	Original work.	
2019–2021	Chūka Ichiban!	Itsuro Kawasaki	24	Based on the manga by Etsushi Ogawa. Produced with NAS. Ran for two 12-episode seasons.	
2019	Psycho-Pass 3	Naoyoshi Shiotani	8	Sequel to Psycho-Pass 2.	
2020	Noblesse	Yasutaka Yamamoto; Shunsuke Tada (Note: Chief director)	13	Based on the manhwa by Son Je-ho. A Crunchyroll original produced with WEBTOON and animated by Production I.G.	
2020–2021	Moriarty the Patriot	Kazuya Nomura	24 (Note: A two-episode original video animation (OVA) was released on Blu-ray and DVD on April 27, 2022.)	Based on the manga by Ryōsuke Takeuchi and Hikaru Miyoshi.	
2021	Fena: Pirate Princess	Kazuto Nakazawa	12	Original work. Adult Swim and Crunchyroll co-production with Production I.G animating.	
2022	Aoashi	Akira Sato	24	Based on the manga by Yūgo Kobayashi and Naohiko Ueno.	
2022	Housing Complex C	Yūji Nara	4	Produced in collaboration with Adult Swim.	
2023	Heavenly Delusion	Hirotaka Mori	13	Based on the manga by Masakazu Ishiguro.	
2023	FLCL: Grunge	Hitoshi Takekiyo	3	Fourth season of FLCL. Produced in collaboration with Adult Swim and general animation production by MontBlanc Pictures.	
2023	FLCL: Shoegaze	Yutaka Uemura	3	Fifth season of FLCL. Produced in collaboration with Adult Swim and general animation production by NUT.	
2024–2025	Kaiju No. 8	Shigeyuki Miya; Tomomi Kamiya	23	Based on the manga by Naoya Matsumoto.	
2024	Uzumaki	Hiroshi Nagahama	4	Produced in collaboration with Adult Swim and general animation production by Fugaku and Akatsuki.	
2024–2025	Shinkalion: Change the World	Kenichiro Komaya	39	Based on the toyline franchise by Takara Tomy. Co-production with Signal.MD.	
2024–2025	Kinnikuman: Perfect Origin Arc	Akira Sato	24	Based on the manga by Yudetamago.	
2026	Eren the Southpaw	Toshimasa Suzuki	13	Based on the manga by Kappi. Co-production with Signal.MD.	

=== OVAs ===
Year	Title	Directors	Eps.	Notes	Refs.
1990	Eiji	Mizuho Nishikubo	1	As I.G Tatsunoko. Based on the manga by Hisashi Eguchi.	
1991	The Heroic Legend of Arslan	Mamoru Hamatsu	1	As I.G Tatsunoko. Produced with Animate Film. Kazuchika Kise served as animation director. Based on the novel series by Yoshiki Tanaka.	
1992	Video Girl Ai	Mizuho Nishikubo	6	As I.G Tatsunoko. Based on the manga by Masakazu Katsura.	
1993	Dragon Half	Shinya Sadamitsu	2	As I.G Tatsunoko. Based on the manga by Ryūsuke Mita.	
1993	Shooting Star Gakusaver	Shinya Sadamitsu	1	As I.G Tatsunoko. Based on the manga by G.Project.	
1993	Girl From Phantasia (Note: Also known as Fantasia.)	Jun Kamiya	1	As I.G Tatsunoko. Based on the manga by Akane Nagano.	
1993	Please Save My Earth	Kazuo Yamazaki	6	First work under the name of Production I.G. Based on the manga by Saki Hiwatari.	
1994	Combustible Campus Guardress	Toshihiko Nishikubo Daisuke Chiba	4	Original OVA published by Shueisha.	
1994	B.B. Fish	Mamoru Hamatsu	1	Based on the manga by Sho Kitagawa.	
1996	The Special Duty Combat Unit Shinesman	Shinya Sadamitsu	2	Based on the manga by Kaim Tachibana.	
1996	Blue Seed Beyond	Jun Kamiya	3	Three-episode OVA with Production I.G working on episodes 1 and 2. Sequel to Blue Seed.	
1996	Panzer Dragoon	Shinji Takagi	1	Based on the video game of the same name.	
1996	Bronze Zetsuai ~ Since 1989	Itsuro Kawasaki	1	Based on the manga by Minami Ozaki.	
1998	One Piece: Defeat Him! Pirate Ganzack!	Goro Taniguchi	1	One Piece special. Based on the manga by Eiichiro Oda.	
2000–2001	FLCL	Kazuya Tsurumaki	6	Produced with Gainax.	
2001	Kai Doh Maru	Kanji Wakabayashi	1	Original work.	
2003	The Prince of Tennis: A Day on Survival Mountain	Takayuki Hamana	1	Special episode of the anime series shown at Jump Festa 2003.	
2004	Van Helsing: The London Assignment		1	Short film based on the movie by Stephen Sommers.	
2007–2008	Tsubasa Tokyo Revelations	Shunsuke Tada	3	Based on the manga by Clamp.	
2007	Tokyo Marble Chocolate	Naoyoshi Shiotani	2	Original work. Directorial debut of Naoyoshi Shiotani.	
2008	Batman: Gotham Knight	Futoshi Higashide (Note: Episode 2) Hiroshi Morioka (Note: Episode 3)	6	In collaboration with Warner Bros and DC Comics. Production I.G worked on two episodes.	
2009	Tsubasa Spring Thunder Chronicles	Shunsuke Tada	2	Sequel to Tsubasa Tokyo Revelations. Based on the manga series by Clamp.	
2010	Halo Legends	Multiple directors	7	Production I.G worked on two episodes.	
2010	Dante's Inferno: An Animated Epic	Multiple directors	6	Production I.G worked in collaboration with multiple other studios.	
2010	Je t'aime	Mamoru Oshii	1	Short film with music by Glay.	
2013	Vassalord	Kazuto Nakazawa	1	Based on the manga by Nanae Chrono.	
2013	Pokémon Origins	Itsuro Kawasaki	4	Production I.G worked on the first episode.	

=== ONAs ===
Year	Title	Directors	Eps.	Notes	Refs.
2005–2006	The King of Fighters: Another Day	Masaki Tachibana	4	Based on the video game series of the same name.	
2008	Chocolate Underground (Note: A film version was shown in theaters in 2009 with added content.)	Takayuki Hamana	13	Based on the novel Bootleg by Alex Shearer. Shown on mobile phones.	
2012	Next A-Class	Mizuho Nishikubo	1	Collaboration with Mercedes-Benz.	
2013	au Unlimited Future Laboratory	Kenji Kamiyama	1	Collaboration with au.	
2016	Noblesse: Awakening	Shunsuke Tada; Kazuto Nakazawa	1	Based on the manhwa by Son Je-ho. A Crunchyroll original produced with WEBTOON and animated by Production I.G.	
2017	Neo Yokio	Kazuhiro Furuhashi; Junji Nishimura	6	Production I.G contributed to storyboards of the series.	
2017	Kodoku no Gourmet	Kazuchika Kise	10	Based on the manga by Masayuki Kusumi and Jiro Taniguchi. Shown on the Tate Anime application.	
2018–2021	B: The Beginning	Kazuto Nakazawa (Note: Credited as Director for Season 1, and as Chief Director for Season 2.); Yoshinobu Yamakawa (Note: Credited as Director for Season 1.); Itsuro Kawasaki (Note: Credited as Director for Season 2.)	18	Original work. Season 2 titled B: The Beginning Succession ran for six episodes in 2021.	
2019–2023	Ultraman	Kenji Kamiyama; Shinji Aramaki	31	Based on the manga by Eichii Shimizu and Tomohiro Shimiguchi. Ran for three seasons. Produced with Sola Digital Arts.	
2020	Sol Levante	Akira Saito	1	In collaboration with Netflix.	
2020–2022	Ghost in the Shell: SAC_2045	Kenji Kamiyama; Shinji Aramaki	24 (Note: A compilation film of the first season was released in November 2021.)	Ran for two twelve-episode seasons. Produced with Sola Digital Arts.	
2021	Star Wars: Visions Volume 1	Kenji Kamiyama	—N/a	Production I.G worked on episode 5: "The Ninth Jedi". In collaboration with Lucasfilm.	
2024	Terminator Zero	Masashi Kudō	8	Based on the Terminator franchise created by James Cameron and Gale Anne Hurd. Produced with No Brakes and Skydance Television.	
2025	Star Wars: Visions Volume 3	Naoyoshi Shiotani	—N/a	Production I.G worked on episode 3: "The Ninth Jedi: Child of Hope". In collaboration with Lucasfilm.	
2026	Star Wars: Visions Presents – The Ninth Jedi	Shunsuke Tada; Kenji Kamiyama (Note: Chief director)	8	In collaboration with Lucasfilm.	
2026	Devils' Crest	Kenichirō Komaya; Shinji Ushiro (Note: Chief director)	TBA	Based on the light novel series by Reki Kawahara.	
TBA	BRZRKR	TBA	TBA	Based on the comic by Keanu Reeves, Matt Kindt and Ron Garney.	

=== Films ===
Year	Title	Directors	Notes	Refs.
1989	Patlabor: The Movie	Mamoru Oshii	Based on the manga by Headgear. Produced with Studio Deen.	
1992	The Weathering Continent	Kōichi Mashimo	Based on the light novel series by Sei Takekawa. As IG Tatsunoko.	
1993	Patlabor 2: The Movie	Mamoru Oshii	As IG Tatsunoko. Based on the original series by Headgear.	
1995	Ghost in the Shell	Mamoru Oshii	Based on the manga by Masamune Shirow.	
1997	Evangelion:Death and Evangelion:Rebirth	Hideaki Anno (Note: Chief director); Kazuya Tsurumaki (Note: Credited as Director for Rebirth and The End of Evangelion.)	With Gainax. Production I.G worked on the Rebirth part of the film.	
1997	The End of Evangelion	Hideaki Anno; Kazuya Tsurumaki	With Gainax.	
1999	Cyber Team in Akihabara: Summer Vacation of 2011	Hiroaki Sakurai	With Xebec. Based on the anime series by Tsukasa Kotobuki.	
2000	Jin-Roh: The Wolf Brigade	Hiroyuki Okiura	Written by Mamoru Oshii.	
2000	Blood: The Last Vampire	Hiroyuki Kitakubo	Based on a story by Kenji Kamiyama. Also developed by Junichi Fujisaku and Mamoru Oshii.	
2001	Sakura Wars: The Movie	Mitsuru Hongo	Based on the Sega video game series of the same name by Oji Hiroi.	
2003	Kill Bill: Volume 1	Quentin Tarantino	Production I.G animated Chapter 3: The Origin of O-Ren.	
2004	Dead Leaves	Hiroyuki Imaishi	Original concept by Hiroyuki Imaishi.	
2004	Ghost in the Shell 2: Innocence	Mamoru Oshii	Sequel to Ghost in the Shell.	
2005	The Prince of Tennis – The Two Samurai: The First Game (Note: Production I.G worked as a co-producer with Trans Arts on another film titled The Prince of Tennis: A Gift from Atobe that was released in 2005.)	Takayuki Hamana	Based on the manga by Takeshi Konomi.	
2005	Tsubasa Reservoir Chronicle the Movie: The Princess in the Birdcage Kingdom	Itsuro Kawasaki	Based on the manga by the group Clamp.	
2005	xxxHolic: A Midsummer Night's Dream	Tsutomu Mizushima	Based on the manga by the group Clamp.	
2006	Ghost in the Shell: Stand Alone Complex - Solid State Society	Kenji Kamiyama	Based on the manga by Masamune Shirow.	
2008	The Sky Crawlers	Mamoru Oshii	Based on the novel series of the same name by Hiroshi Mori.	
2009	Tales of Vesperia: The First Strike	Kanta Kamei	Based on the Namco video game of the same name.	
2009	Eden of the East: The King of Eden	Kenji Kamiyama	—N/a	
2009	Oblivion Island: Haruka and the Magic Mirror	Shinsuke Sato	—N/a	
2010	Eden of the East: Paradise Lost	Kenji Kamiyama	—N/a	
2010–2011	Broken Blade (Note: A 12-episode series adaptation of the films aired in 2014 with added content.)	Tetsuro Amino (Note: Chief director); Nobuyoshi Habara (Note: Director)	Six films released from 2010 to 2011. Based on the manga by Yunosuke Yoshinaga. Produced with Xebec.	
2010	Book Girl (Note: Three original video animations (OVA) were released on DVD along with the release of the film.)	Shunsuke Tada	Based on the light novel series of the same name by Mizuki Nomura.	
2010	Hiyokoi	Norihiro Naganuma	—N/a	
2010	Loups=Garous	Junichi Fujisaku	With Trans Arts.	
2011	Sengoku Basara: The Last Party	Kazuya Nomura	—N/a	
2011	Drawer Hobs	Kazuchika Kise	Short film.	
2011	A Letter to Momo	Hiroyuki Okiura	World premiere in 2011. Released in Japan in 2012.	
2011	Xi Avant	Kenji Kamiyama	Short film. Collaboration with NTT Docomo.	
2011	The Prince of Tennis – The Battle of the British City	Shunsuke Tada	—N/a	
2011	Appleseed XIII: Tartaros	Takayuki Hamana	Based on the manga series of the same name by Masamune Shirow. Compilation of anime series.	
2011	Appleseed XIII: Ouranos	Takayuki Hamana	Based on the manga series of the same name by Masamune Shirow. Compilation of anime series.	
2012	Blood-C: The Last Dark	Naoyoshi Shiotani	Sequel to the anime series.	
2012	Library War: The Wings of Revolution	Takayuki Hamana	Sequel to the anime series.	
2012	009 Re:Cyborg	Kenji Kamiyama	Based on the manga Cyborg 009 by Shotaro Ishinomori.	
2012	Wasurenagumo	Toshihisa Kaiya	Short film made for the Anime Mirai project.	
2012	Mass Effect: Paragon Lost	Atsushi Takeuchi	Prequel story to Mass Effect 3. With BioWare and T.O. Entertainment.	
2013	Kick-Heart	Masaaki Yuasa	Short film. Financed through a Kickstarter funding campaign.	
2014	Giovanni's Island	Mizuho Nishikubo	—N/a	
2015	Psycho-Pass: The Movie	Katsuyuki Motoriho (Note: General director); Naoyoshi Shiotani	—N/a	
2015	Miss Hokusai	Keiichi Hara	Based on the manga series by Hinako Sugiura.	
2015	Ghost in the Shell: The New Movie	Kazuchika Kise (Note: Chief director); Kazuya Nomura	—N/a	
2015	Pigtails	Yoshimi Itazu	Based on the manga by Machiko Kyō. Short animated film used for a stage play of the manga.	
2017	Kuroko's Basketball The Movie: Last Game	Shunsuke Tada	—N/a	
2018	Tokimeki Restaurant: Miracle 6	Chiaki Kon	Based on the Tokimeki Restaurant mobile game by Koei Tecmo and Konami.	
2019	Psycho-Pass: Sinners of the System	Naoyoshi Shiotani	Film trilogy.	
2019	Legend of the Galactic Heroes: Die Neue These – Stellar War	Shunsuke Tada	Film trilogy that served as the second season of the anime series.	
2019–2021	Fafner in the Azure – The Beyond	Takashi Noto	Film tetralogy released from 2019 to 2021. Produced with Xebec.	
2020	Psycho-Pass 3: First Inspector	Naoyoshi Shiotani	—N/a	
2020	BEM: Become Human	Hiroshi Ikehata	Reboot of the Humanoid Monster Bem anime series.	
2021	Fate/Grand Order – Divine Realm of the Round Table: Camelot	Kazuto Arai	Animation production for the second film titled Paladin; Agaterám.	
2022	The Deer King	Masashi Ando; Masayuki Miyaji	Based on the novel series by Nahoko Uehashi.	
2022	Deemo: Memorial Keys	Shūhei Matsushita	Based on the Deemo video game by Rayark. With Signal.MD.	
2022	Legend of the Galactic Heroes: Die Neue These – Clash	Shunsuke Tada	Film trilogy that served as the third season of the anime series.	
2022	Legend of the Galactic Heroes: Die Neue These – Intrigue	Shunsuke Tada	Film trilogy that served as the fourth season of the anime series.	
2023	Fafner in the Azure: Behind the Line	Takashi Noto	—N/a	
2023	Rakudai Majo	Takayuki Hamana	Based on the book series by Satoko Narita.	
2023	Psycho-Pass Providence	Naoyoshi Shiotani	Film celebrating the 10th anniversary of the Psycho-Pass franchise.	
2023	The Concierge at Hokkyoku Department Store	Yoshimi Itazu	Based on the manga by Tsuchika Nishimura.	
2024	Haikyu!! The Dumpster Battle	Susumu Mitsunaka	Sequel to the anime series.	
2025	Kill Bill: The Whole Bloody Affair	—N/a	Production I.G animated Chapter 3: The Origin of O-Ren.	
2027	Haikyu!! vs. The Little Giant	Susumu Mitsunaka	Sequel to Haikyu!! The Dumpster Battle.	
2027	Kaiju No. 8: The Final Mission	Shigeyuki Miya	Based on the manga by Naoya Matsumoto. A sequel that served as the conclusion to the anime series.	
TBA	Space Battleship Yamato √2199	Hideaki Anno; Yutaka Izubuchi	With Studio Khara. Based on the anime series by Yoshinobu Nishizaki.	

=== Live-action series ===
- K-tai Investigator 7 (2008–2009)
- Stay Tuned! (2019)
- Dragons of Wonderhatch (2023, animated scenes)

=== Music videos ===
- m-flo: Quantum Leap (2000)
- Linda: Chains & Rings (2003)
- Mylène Farmer: Peut-être toi (2006)
- Maaya Sakamoto: Universe (2007)
- Re:vale: NO DOUBT (2017)
- Valorant: 二律背反 REFLECTIONS (2023)

=== Video games ===
- Power Pros (1994)
- Tales series (1995–2009)
- Grandia (1997, CG support)
- Ghost in the Shell (1997, animated sequences)
- The Granstream Saga (1997, animated sequences)
- Yarudora Series Vol. 1: Double Cast (1998, animated cutscenes)
- Yarudora Series Vol. 2: Kisetsu o Dakishimete (1998, animated cutscenes)
- Yarudora Series Vol. 3: Sampaguita (1998, animated cutscenes)
- Yarudora Series Vol. 4: Yukiwari no Hana (1998, animated cutscenes)
- Tekken 3 (1998, pre-rendered CGI cutscenes and animated cutscene)
- Xenogears (1998, traditionally animated cutscenes and pre-rendered CGI cutscenes)
- Sakura Wars 2: Thou Shalt Not Die (1998)
- Ace Combat 3: Electrosphere (1999)
- Love & Destroy (1999)
- Psychometrer Eiji (1999)
- Valkyrie Profile (1999, character design)
- Wild Arms 2 (1999)
- Summon Night (2000)
- Sakura Wars 3: Is Paris Burning? (2001)
- Sakura Wars 4: Fall in Love, Maidens (2002)
- Silk to Cotton (2002, character design)
- Surveillance Kanshisha (2002)
- Sakura Wars V Episode 0 (2004)
- Lethal Enforcers 3 (2004)
- Popolocrois Monogatari II (2000, opening and animated cutscenes)
- Fire Emblem: Path of Radiance (2005, CG animated cutscenes)
- Namco × Capcom (2005)
- Sonic Riders (2006, opening animation)
- Children of Mana (2006, animated cutscenes)
- Valkyrie Profile 2: Silmeria (2006)
- Fire Emblem: Radiant Dawn (2007, CG animated cutscenes)
- Star Ocean: First Departure (2007)
- Star Ocean: Second Evolution (2008)
- Wario Land: Shake It! (2008, cutscenes and character animation)
- Sands of Destruction (2008)
- The Sky Crawlers: Innocent Aces (2008, CG animated cutscenes)
- Infinite Space (2009, short promotional film produced with studio Gonzo)
- Valkyria Chronicles III (2011, opening animation)
- Kid Icarus: Uprising (2012, Thanatos rising shorts)
- BlazBlue: Central Fiction (2016, opening animation)
- Persona 5 (2016, animated cutscenes, with Domerica)
- Persona 5 Royal (2019, animated cutscenes, with Domerica)
- Another Eden (2020, opening animation)
