= Alan Igbon =

English actor (1952–2020)

- Igbon in Auf Wiedersehen, Pet 2002
- Born: 29 May 1952; Hulme, Manchester, England
- Died: 9 December 2020 (aged 68)
- Occupation: actor

Alan Igbon (29 May 1952 – 9 December 2020) was a British actor, notable for his role as Loggo Logmond in the television series Boys from the Blackstuff. His credits include Scum (1979), Babylon (1980), The Black Stuff (1980), Water (1985), Auf Wiedersehen, Pet (2002), Coronation Street (2003), and Doctors (2004).

== Life and career ==
Alan Olanrewaju Igbon was born in Hulme, Manchester, in May 1952. His father Lawrence was Nigerian, and his mother Mary was Irish. Igbon grew up loving music and art and boxed in over 60 fights before training as an actor in London.

Early stage work came in 1974, at Liverpool Playhouse in the title role of a Toxteth youth who believes himself to be a descendent of the famed sea captain in Philip Martin's play, Nelson Lives in Liverpool 8.

Igbon took the background part of inmate Meakin in the cinematic re-make of the controversial borstal TV film Scum (1979), whose character launched an emotional tirade against senior members of staff after the suicide of another convict. The cast included Ray Winstone and Patrick Murray.

Igbon appeared as Angadi, part of a kidnapping gang in the LWT drama The Professionals; episode The Acorn Syndrome (1980). Igbon starred as Loggo in Boys from the Blackstuff, a BBC television drama about a group of unemployed men in Liverpool during the recession-ravaged early 1980s, written by Alan Bleasdale. He also took a leading role in the sitcom The Front Line, playing the dreadlocked Sheldon, alongside Paul Barber as his police officer brother Malcolm, and had a role in the film Water (1985).

Other staple programmes in which Igbon featured include Bleasdale's drama G.B.H., medical serial Doctors and Channel 4 soap opera Brookside. He had a supporting role in the third series of Auf Wiedersehen, Pet as a bodyguard and stooge to the programme's main villain (played by Boys from the Blackstuff co-star Michael Angelis) and then took a temporary role in ITV soap Coronation Street, playing Tony Stewart the estranged father of regular character Jason Grimshaw. The character returned eleven years later in 2014, but Igbon did not return for the role, which was recast to Terence Maynard.

== Death ==
Igbon died on 9 December 2020 at the age of 68, from pneumonia. He was survived by his partner Sam, son Maximillian, sister Brenda, and brother Lawrence.

== Filmography ==
=== Film ===
Year	Title	Role	Notes
1979	Scum	Meakin	
1980	Babylon	Rupert	
1985	Water	Cuban	

=== Television ===
Year	Title	Role	Notes
1975	Nightingale's Boys	Ola	Episode: "Tweety"
1975	Crown Court	Peter Facey	Episode: "The Trees Part 1"
1975	Coronation Street	Steve Baker	2 episodes
1978	Me! I'm Afraid of Virginia Woolf	Boswell	TV film
1978	Life Begins at 40	Darren Braithwaite	2 episodes
1979	Playhouse	Mike	Episodes:The Daughters of Albion
1980	The Professionals	Angadi	Episode: "The Acorn Syndrome"
1980	Mixed Blessings	Isaiah	3 episodes
1980	The Black Stuff	Loggo Logmond	Main role (TV film)
1981	Angels	Tony	2 episodes
1982	No Problem!	Isaiah	3 episodes
1982	Boys from the Blackstuff	Loggo Logmond	main role - 5 episodes
1985	Brookside	Gene	1 episodes
1982 - 1985	The Front Line	Sheldon	6 episodes
1989	Women in Tropical Places	-	TV film
1991	G.B.H	Teddy	7 episodes
1994	Blood on the Dole	Art Gallery Attendant	TV film
1994-1995	Moving Story (TV series)	Dennis	3 episodes
1995	The Bill	Colin West	1 episode - Old Habitats
1997	Cold Enough for Snow	Pete in the Garage	TV film
1997	Gobble	2nd Security man	TV film
2002	Auf Wiedersehen, Pet	Addey	3 episodes
2003	Coronation Street	Tony Stewart	25 episodes
2004	Doctors	Leon Marsh	
