= Twardowski's Mirror =

Renaissance mirror

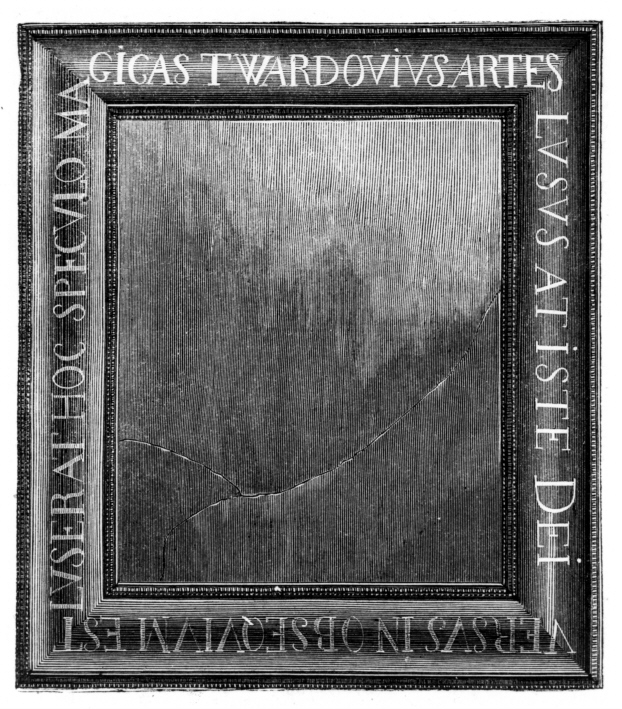
Twardowski's Mirror in Węgrów

Twardowski's Mirror is a Renaissance mirror made of brittle metal.

Two mirrors associated with the legend of Pan Twardowski have survived to the present day. Both were likely made in Germany at the beginning of the 16th century. Their exact purpose is not entirely clear. According to tradition, they were objects used by medieval and Renaissance alchemists to perform various magical arts.

The first mirror is kept in the sacristy of the Basilica of the Assumption in Węgrów. It arrived there at the beginning of the 18th century through the Krasiński family, who reportedly donated it as a votive gift for the furnishing of a new religious house for the Bartholomites.

== Description ==
The only publicly displayed Twardowski mirror, originating from Węgrów, is cracked into three pieces and tarnished. It is made of "white metal," an alloy of silver, gold, zinc, and tin. The object measures 56 by 46.5 centimetres (22.0 in × 18.3 in) and is set in a black wooden frame featuring a Latin inscription: Luserat hoc speculo magicas Twardovius artes, lusus at iste Dei versus in obseqvium est.

According to a hypothesis by Pantelejmon Juriew, there are etchings of two figures on the surface of the mirror that are invisible to the naked eye; the projection of this image is said to be revealed under a strong beam of light.
