= Bartholomew Holzhauser =

German priest

Venerable Bartholomew Holzhauser
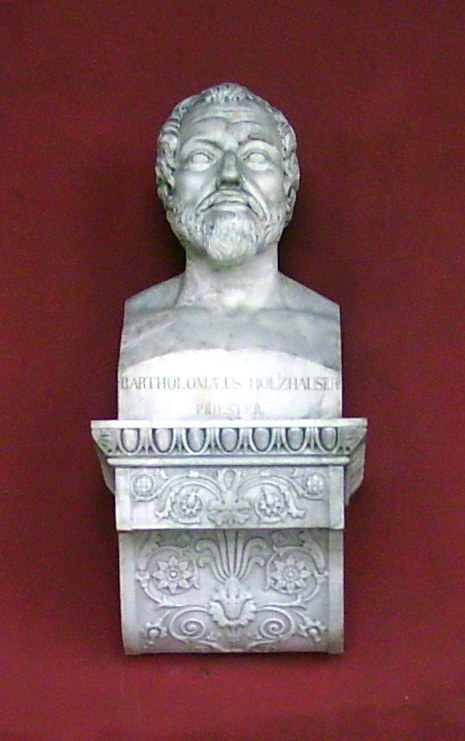
- Bartholomew Holzhauser in the Hall of Fame, Munich

Confessor
- Born: August 24, 1613; Laugna, Prince-Bishopric of Augsburg, Holy Roman Empire (now Bavaria, Germany)
- Died: May 20, 1658 (aged 44); Bingen, Electorate of Mainz, Holy Roman Empire (now Rhineland-Palatinate, Germany)
- Venerated in: Roman Catholic Church
- Feast: May 20

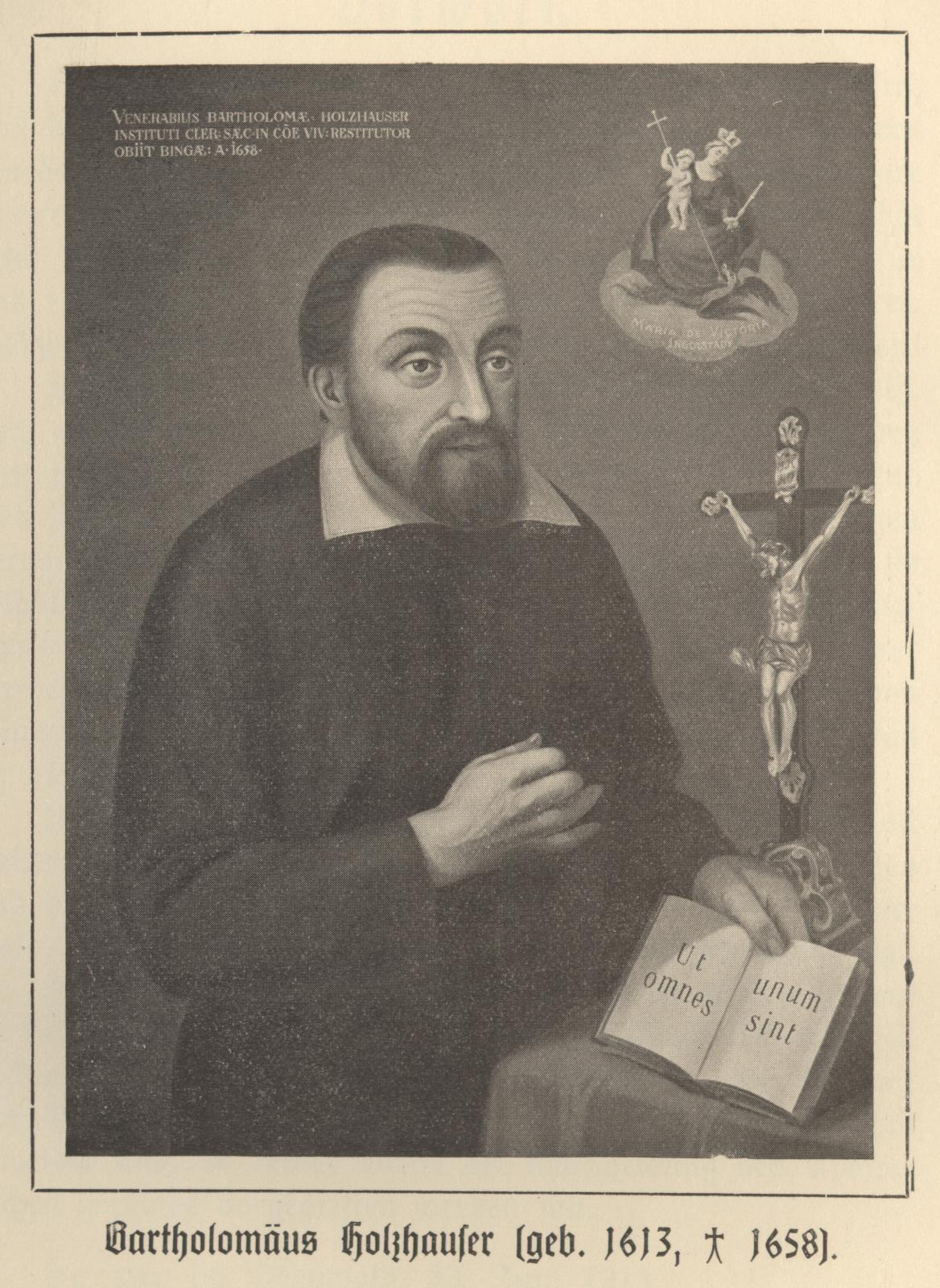
Bartholomew Holzhauser, contemporary painting

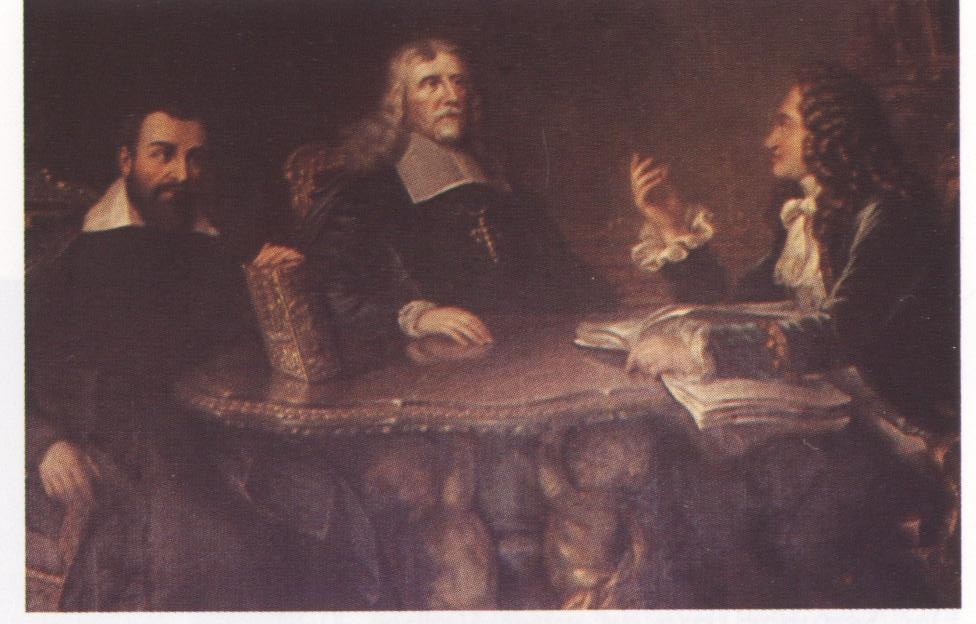
Bartholomew Holzhauser (left), together with Archbishop Johann Philipp von Schönborn (centre) and King Charles II of England (right). Contemporary painting.

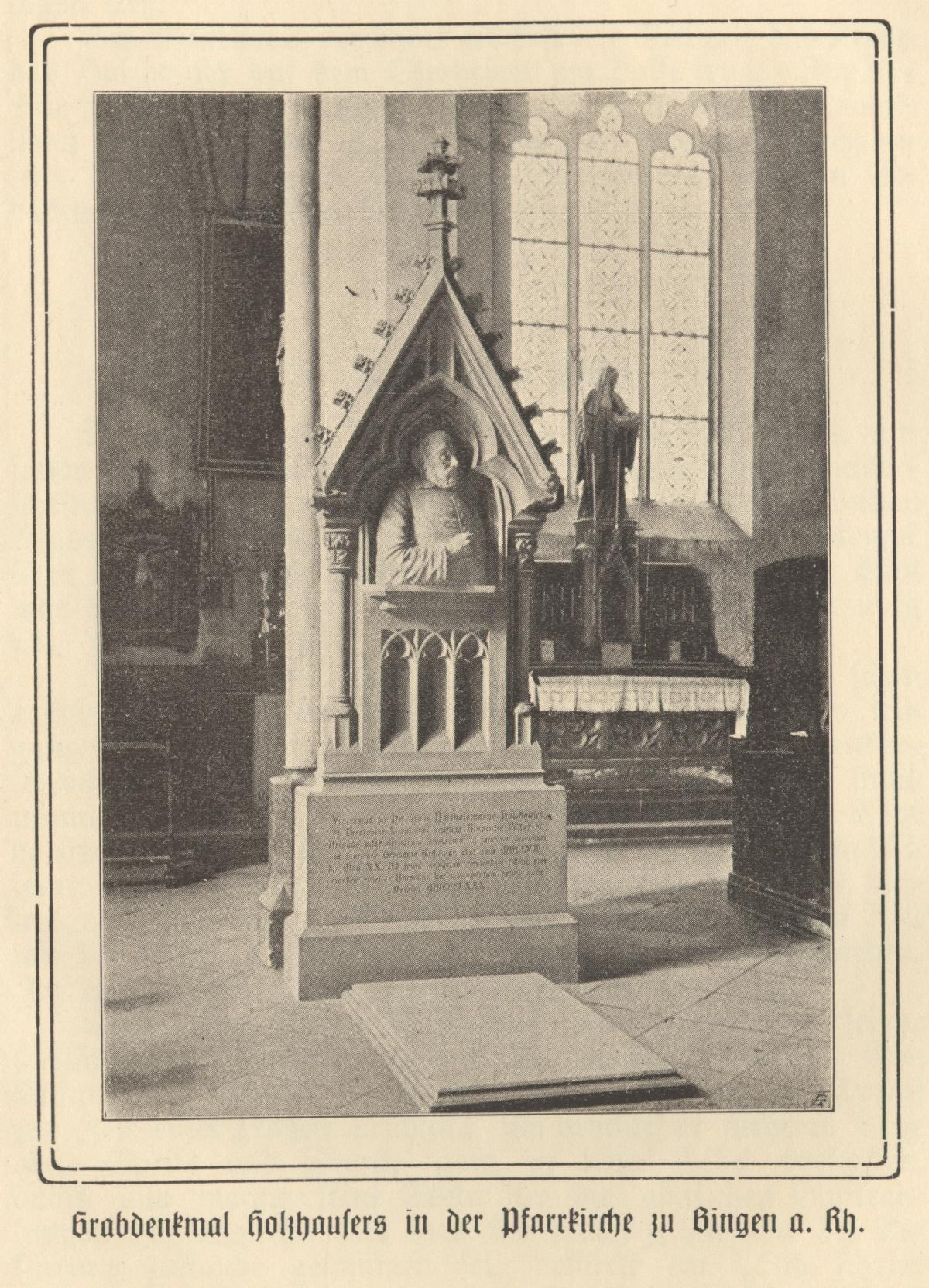
Tomb Holzhausers in Bingen, 1913

Venerable Bartholomew Holzhauser (August 24, 1613 – May 20, 1658) was a German priest, a founder of a religious community, and a visionary and writer of prophecies.

== Early life ==
Bartholomew Holzhauser was born in Laugna, into the family of Leonard and Catherine Holzhauser, who were poor, pious, and honest people. Leonard and Catherine had eleven children, including Bartholomew. Leonard Holzhauser practiced as a shoemaker. Young Bartholomew developed a great love for books and an earnest desire to enter the sacred ministry.

At Augsburg, he was admitted to a free school for poor boys, earning his living by going from door to door singing and begging. He fell sick of an epidemic raging at that time. After his recovery, Bartholomew went home and for a time helped his father at work.

== Education ==
He then continued his studies at Neuburg an der Donau and Ingolstadt, with the aid of kind friends and the Jesuits in particular. His teachers were unanimous in praising his talents, his piety, and his modesty, and entertained great hopes of his usefulness in the service of the Church.

On July 9, 1636, he received the degree of Doctor of Philosophy, and then studied theology, in which he merited the baccalaureate on May 11, 1639. He was ordained into the priesthood by the Bishop of Eichstätt, and said his first Holy Mass on Pentecost Sunday, June 12, 1639 in the Church of Our Lady of Victory, at Ingolstadt.

== Priestly life ==
He exercised his priestly functions at this place for some time and was soon much sought after as a confessor. In the meantime, he attended lectures at the university and was declared licentiate of theology on June 14, 1640. On August 1 of the same year, he came into the Archdiocese of Salzburg, and was made dean and pastor of Tittmoning.

On February 2, 1642, he became pastor of St John's at Leoggenthal, in the county of Tyrol, at the behest of the Bishop of Chiemsee.

In the spring of 1655, at the invitation of Archbishop Johann Philipp von Schönborn, he went to Mainz where he was soon appointed pastor at Bingen on the Rhine, and in 1657, dean of the district of Algesheim.

He died at Bingen in the spring of 1658 at age 44. On the occasion of the second centenary of his death, a celebration was held at Bingen in the presence of the Bishop of Mainz. The location of his remains was again found and in 1880, a new monument was erected over his grave at the parish church. He was declared Venerable by the Roman Catholic Church.

== Founder of the Bartholomites ==
Bartholomew Holzhauser founded the Bartholomites, called United Brethren or officially Institutum clericorum sæcularium in communi viventium, also receiving the designation Communists in the aftermath of the Thirty Years War in Europe. Because Faith had become lukewarm among the faithful, and morals and discipline had relaxed not only in the laity but also in the clergy, he decided to establish a new religious society as a remedy.

This would become a congregation known as the Apostolic Union of Secular Priests. This order would lead an apostolic life in the community and become models of priestly perfection and zealous leaders of the people. Their principal task was to educate in the seminaries. The members of the secular congregation were expected to live in the seminaries, or in groups of two or three in the parishes, and to follow a set routine of daily prayers and exercises. Funds were to be in common, and all female servants were to be dismissed. No vows were to be taken, but a simple promise of obedience to the superior was to be made, confirmed by an oath.

Father Holzhauser first tried to establish such a community in the diocese of Eichstätt, but did not succeed. At Tittmoning, encouraged by John Christopher von Lichtenstein, the Bishop of Chiemsee, a suffragan and principal adviser of the Archbishop of Salzburg, he had made a good beginning. Priests joined from the diocese of Chiemsee and from other dioceses.

== Visions ==
Holzhauser was a visionary, and made his visions public by presenting them in 1646 to Emperor Ferdinand III and to Duke Maximilian I, Elector of Bavaria. Ludwig Clarus published these visions, along with a commentary showing their partial fulfillment, in German, in 1849.

One of the prophetic visions concerned England. Holzhauser foresaw the execution of Charles I of England and the complete ruin of the Church in that kingdom. He also foresaw that after the Holy Sacrifice had ceased for 120 years, England would be converted and do more for religion than it had done after its first conversion. This seems to have been fulfilled for the prohibition of the Mass under penalty of capital punishment was enacted in 1658 and partially recalled in 1778.

He also wrote a remarkable work on the last book of the New Testament, the Revelation or the Apocalypse, which today is still held in high regard by Roman Catholics. He interpreted the book of the Apocalypse as follows: The seven stars and the seven candlesticks seen by St John signify seven periods of the history of the Church, from its foundation to its consummation at the final judgment. To these periods correspond the seven churches of Asia Minor, the seven days of the Mosaic record of creation, the seven ages before Christ, and the seven gifts of the Holy Ghost. Since, he claimed, all life is developed in seven stages, so God has fixed seven periods for regeneration.

The central features of this apocalyptic commentary concerned the strong ruler, or the Grand Monarch, and the Holy Pope, a favorite subject of medieval prophecy, as well as the division of church history into seven periods.

== Death ==
Holzhauser died, aged 44, at Bingen. At the time of his death, the community had members at Chiemsee, Salzburg, Freising, Eichstätt, Würzburg, and Mainz. The institute, however, made many enemies. At the end of the eighteenth century, it became extinct, after having had 1595 members at its height.

== Works ==
Holzhauser's religious writings include:

- Constitutiones et exercitia spiritualia Clericorum sæcularium in communi viventium (Cologne, 1662; Würzburg, 1669, Rome, 1680, Mainz, 1782); used in seminaries during the seventeenth and eighteenth centuries, helping spread primary education
- Epistola fundamentalis (1644); a letter of consolation and encouragement to his disciples during a period of opposition to the community
- De humilitate
- Tractatus de discretione spiritum
- Documenta pro iis qui conversioni hæreticorum et infidelium se impendunt
- Visiones, a compilation of seven visions:
  1. De septem animalibus
  2. De unâ monarchiâ et duabus sedibus
  3. De s. Michaele archangelo et sedibus
  4. De ecclesiâ sponsâ Dei
  5. De propriâ personâ Jesu
  6. De egressione Danubii
  7. De verme grandi
  8. De conversione Germaniæ
  9. Exprobratio vitiorum, exprobratio impœnitentiæ, quomodo revertatur?
  10. De duabus personis
- Interpretatio Apocalypsis usque ad cap. XV, v. 5 (1784, Bamberg), which enumerates seven ages of the Catholic church:
  1. the status seminativus or the first age of the church, from Christ and the Apostles to Pope Linus and Emperor Nero,
  2. the status irrigativus or the second age of the church, the days of persecution,
  3. the status illuminativus or the third age of the church, from Pope Sylvester to Leo III,
  4. the status pacifitcus or the fourth age of the church, from Leo III to Leo X,
  5. the status afflictionis et purgativus or the fifth age of the church, from Leo X to a strong ruler or grand monarch and a holy pope,
  6. the status consolationis or the sixth age of the church, from that holy pope to the birth of the Antichrist,
  7. the status desolationis or the seventh and last age of the church, from the Antichrist to the end of the world.
