= Apostolic Union of Secular Priests =

Roman Catholic clergy association

The Apostolic Union of Secular Priests is an association of Roman Catholic secular priests (i.e. priests who are not monastics and do not belong to any religious institute). The modern association is a revival of the Institutum clericorum sæcularium in communi viventium (also known as the Bartholomites or United Brethren), which was founded in 1640 by the German communitarian priest Bartholomew Holzhauser. Due to their statutes regulating life on communitarian principles, members of the original institute were also historically designated as "Communists". While the original 17th-century institute went extinct by the end of the eighteenth century, its rule of life served as the model for the 1862 reorganization that established the contemporary Apostolic Union.

The organization's function "was partly to ease, through 'a uniform rule of life', the crippling loneliness which was often felt by priests ... 'who are scattered far apart'."

In 1903, Pope Pius X placed the union under his special protection. In 1913, it was reorganised in France by Canon Lebeurier.
