= Węgrów =

Town in Masovian Voivodeship, Poland

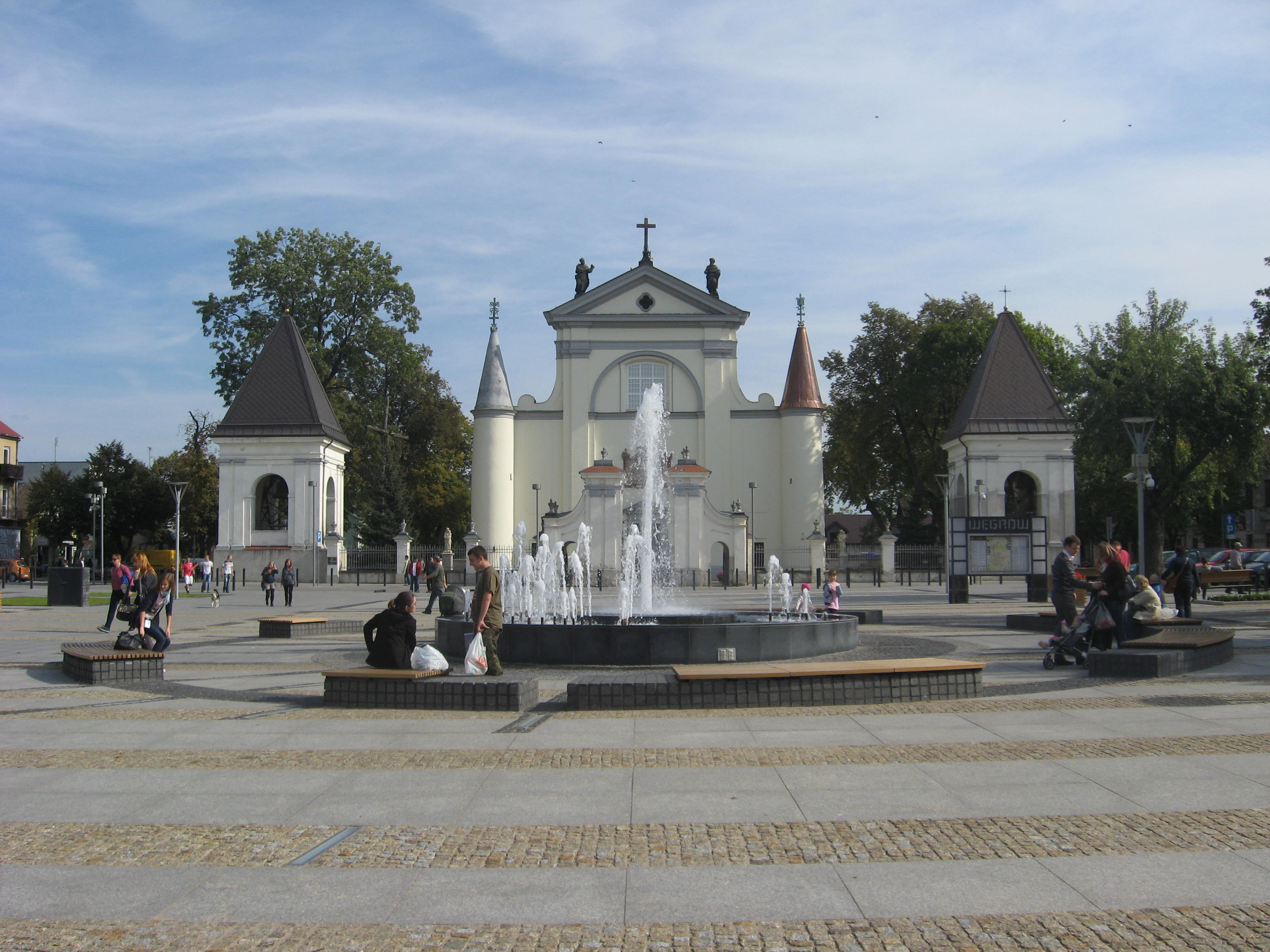
- Baroque Basilica of the Assumption at the Market Square

- Coat of arms

- Location within Poland
- Coordinates: 52°24′N 22°1′E
- Country: Poland
- Voivodeship: Masovian
- County: Węgrów
- Gmina: Węgrów (urban gmina)
- Established: 14th century
- Town rights: 1441

Government
  - Mayor: Paweł Marchela

Area
  - Total: 35.45 km^{2} (13.69 sq mi)

Population (2013)
  - Total: 11,993
  - Density: 338.3/km^{2} (876.2/sq mi)
- Time zone: UTC+1 (CET)
  - Summer (DST): UTC+2 (CEST)
- Postal code: 07-100
- Area code: +48 25
- Car plates: WWE
- Website: http://www.wegrow.com.pl

Węgrów ([ˈvɛŋɡruf]; Yiddish: ווענגעראָווע, romanized: Vengrov) is a town in eastern Poland with 12,796 inhabitants (2013), capital of Węgrów County in the Masovian Voivodeship.

== History ==
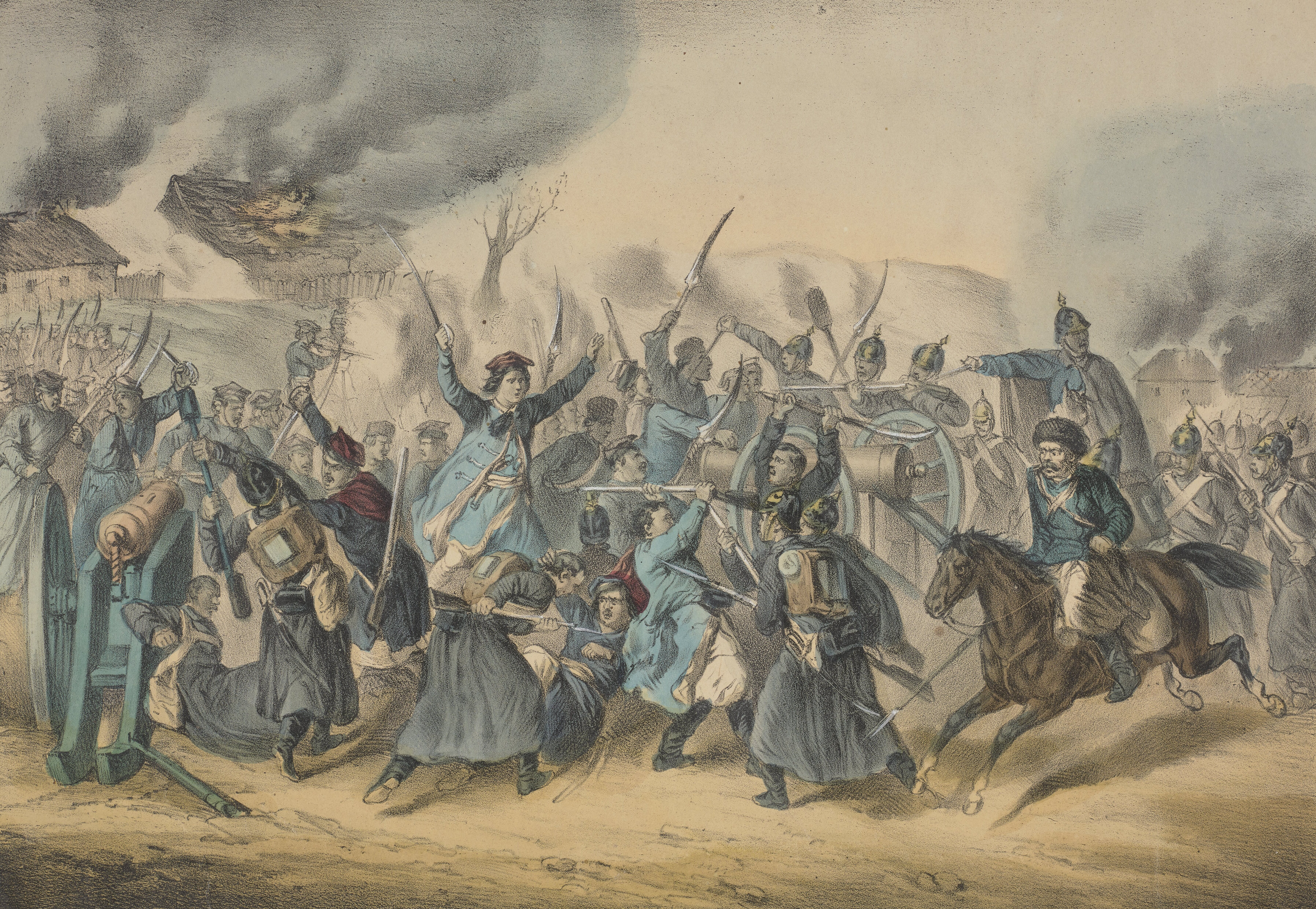
Battle of Węgrów

First mentioned in historical records in 1414, Węgrów received its city charter in 1441. Between 16th and 18th centuries it was an important centre for Reformation movements in Poland. It was a private town owned by various Polish nobles, including the Kiszka, Radziwiłł, Niszcz and Krasiński families, administratively located in the Podlaskie Voivodeship in the Lesser Poland Province of the Kingdom of Poland. The local Basilica of the Assumption houses Twardowski's Mirror, a Renaissance mirror from the 16th century associated with the legend of Sir Twardowski.

After the Third Partition of Poland it was annexed by Austria in 1795. It was regained by Poles following the Austro–Polish War of 1809, and included within the short-lived Duchy of Warsaw. After the duchy's dissolution, in 1815, it passed to so-called Congress Poland in the Russian Partition of Poland. It was the site of four battles between Polish insurgents and Russian troops during the Polish November Uprising of 1830–1831. During the January Uprising, on 3 February 1863, it was the site of the Battle of Węgrów, in which Polish insurgents defeated Russian troops and captured the town. From 1867 to 1912, Węgrów was part of Siedlce Governorate and from 1912 to 1915 of Łomża Governorate.

It became part of independent Poland again when the country regained its independence in 1918. From 1919 to 1938, Węgrów was part of Lublin Voivodeship and from 1938 to 1939 of Warsaw Voivodeship. During the Polish–Soviet War, on 19 August 1920, it was the site of a battle between Poles and the retreating Russian 16th Army.

Throughout most of its history, the town had a thriving Jewish community, present at least since the 16th century. It numbered about 6,000 in 1939. The entire community was exterminated during the Holocaust by the occupying forces of Nazi Germany, during which time the Nazis also created the Węgrów Ghetto.

The town was liberated from German occupation by the Polish underground Home Army in August 1944 during the Operation Tempest.

== Demographics ==
Historical population

Year	Pop.	±%
1890	7,950	—
1897	8,268	+4.0%
1910	11,322	+36.9%
1921	8,522	−24.7%
1931	9,416	+10.5%

Year	Pop.	±%
1939	10,103	+7.3%
1950	5,092	−49.6%
1960	5,778	+13.5%
2010	12,641	+118.8%

== Economy ==
Węgrów is home to Odlewnia dzwonów Braci Kruszewskich (Kruszewski Brothers Bell Foundry), founded in the 19th century, which has cast more than 2,500 bells that have been installed in Poland and other countries, even as distant as Rwanda and Papua New Guinea.

== Transport ==
Węgrów lies on national road 62, which connects it to Sokołów Podlaski and Łochów.

The nearest railway station is in the town of Łochów to the west.

== People from Węgrów ==
- Krzysztof Filipek (born 1961), politician
- Piotr z Goniądza (c. 1525–1573), religious leader and writer
- Stanisław Kosior (1889–1939), Soviet politician
- Samuel Rajzman (1902–1979), Holocaust survivor and court witness
