= Deal with the Devil =

Pact between a person and the Devil or another demon

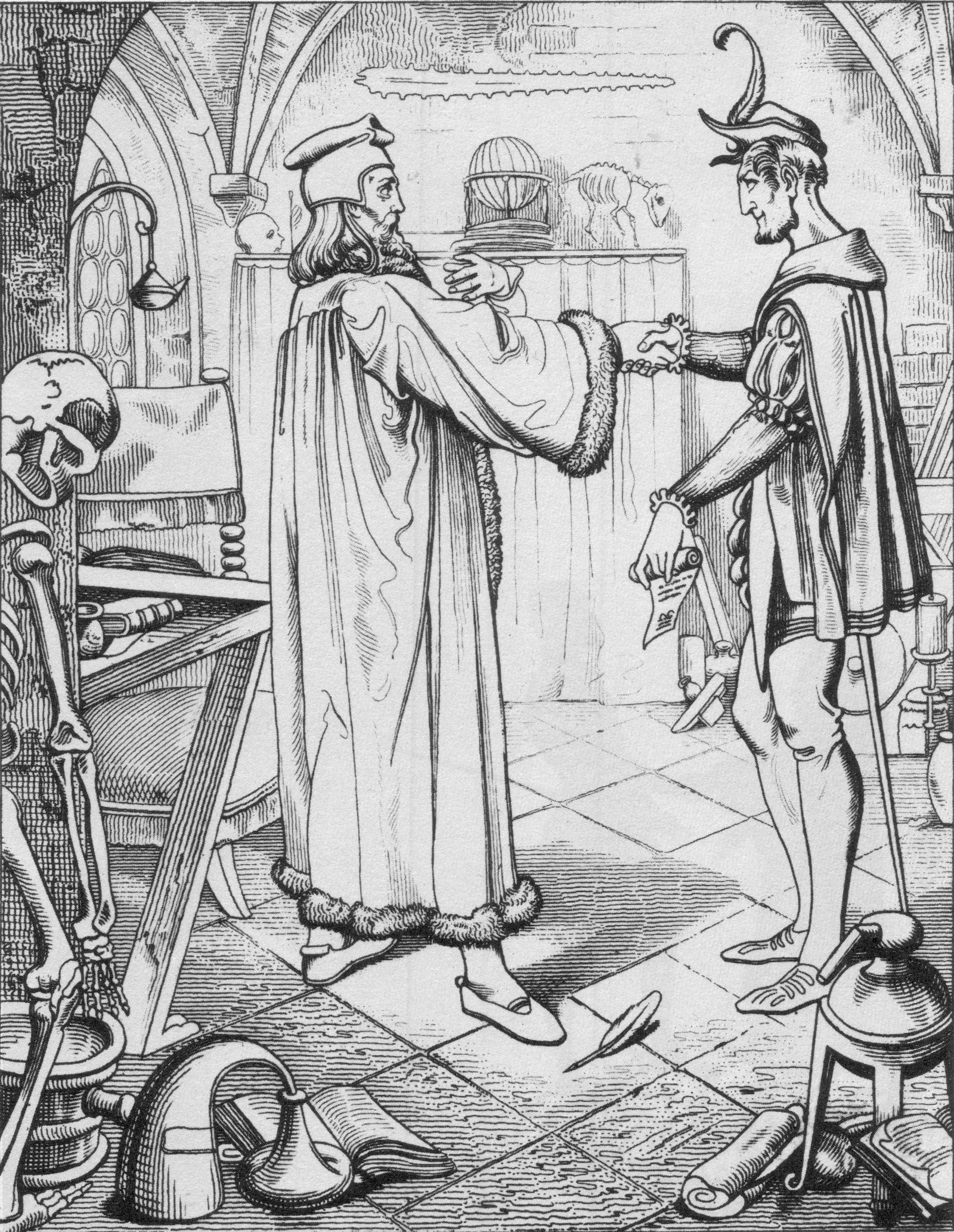
Engraving of Faust's pact with Mephisto, by Adolf Gnauth (circa 1840)

A deal with the Devil or Faustian bargain (Note: Also called a pact with the Devil or Mephistophelian bargain.) is a cultural trope exemplified most famously by the legend of Faust, was signed a contract with the demon Mephistopheles in exchange for knowledge and pleasure. Similar stories are also elemental to many Christian traditions. The pact between a person and the Devil or another demon generally involves trading one's soul for diabolical favours, which vary by the tale, but tend to include youth, knowledge, wealth, fame and power.

It was also believed that some people made this type of pact just as a sign of recognising the minion as their master, in exchange for nothing. The bargain is a dangerous one, as the price of the fiend's service is the wagerer's soul. For most religions, the tale may have a bad end, with eternal damnation for the foolhardy venturer. Conversely, it may have a comic twist, in which a wily peasant outwits the devil, characteristically on a technical point. The person making the pact sometimes tries to outwit the devil, but loses in the end (e.g., man sells his soul for eternal life because he will never die to pay his end of the bargain. Immune to the death penalty, he commits murder, but is sentenced to life in prison).

A number of famous works dating back to the early Middle Ages refer to pacts with the devil, from the numerous European Devil's Bridges to the violin virtuosity of Giuseppe Tartini and Niccolò Paganini to the "crossroad" myth associated with Robert Johnson. The tale of Faust gained notoriety in the English world following Christopher Marlowe's play The Tragical History of Doctor Faustus (c. 1592), and then Goethe's Faust, which was published in two parts in the late 18th and early 19th centuries, became an international hit and gave new life to the legend.

In Stith Thompson's Motif-Index of Folk-Literature, "Bargain with the devil" constitutes motif number M210 and "Man sells soul to devil" motif number M211.

== Synopsis ==
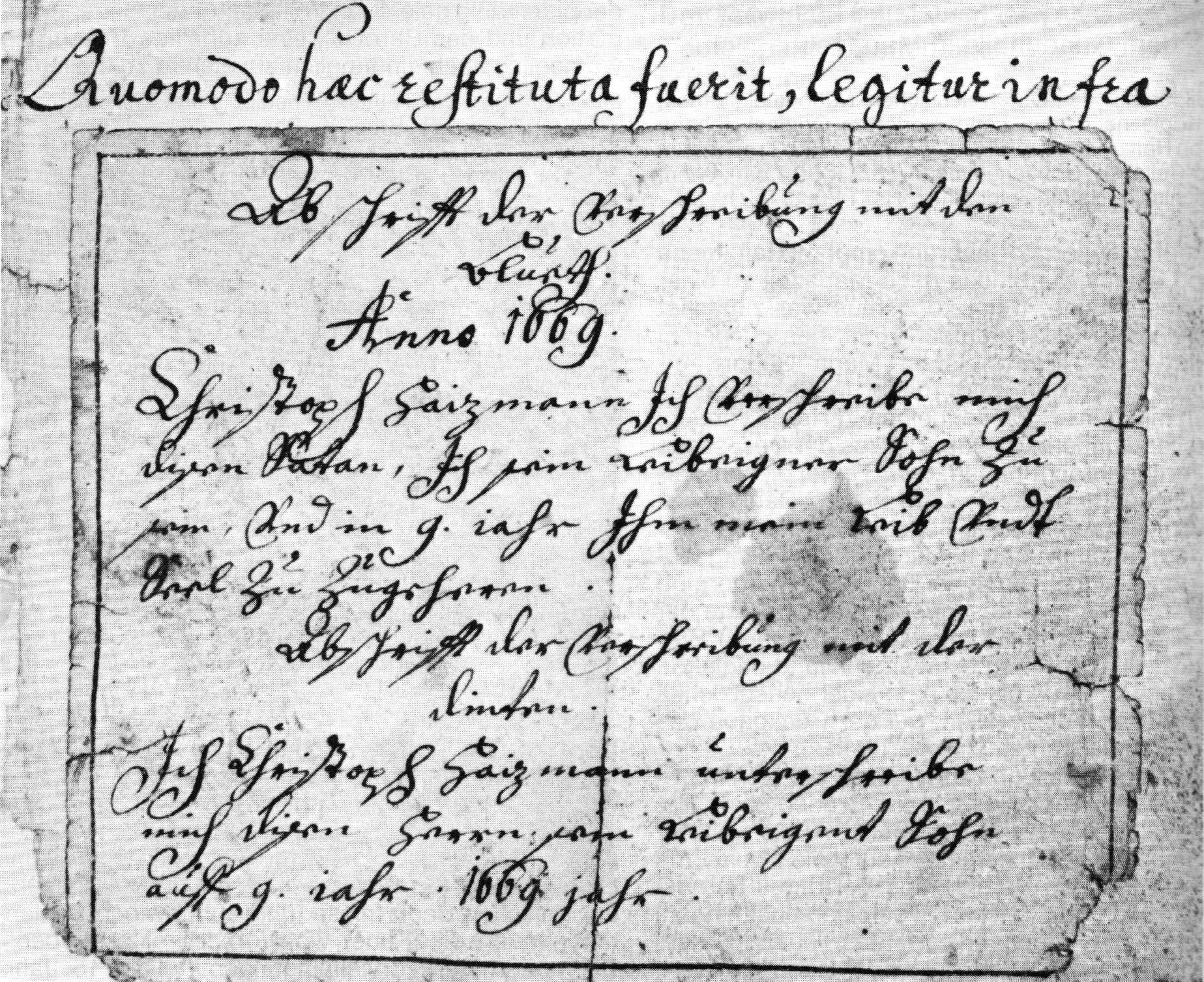
Copy of a written deal by Christoph Haizmann from 1669.

Deals with the devil, just like normal contracts in society can be either oral or written. An oral pact may be made by means of invocations, conjurations, or rituals to attract the demon; once the conjurer thinks the demon is present, they ask for the wanted favour and offer their soul in exchange, and no evidence is left of the pact. But according to some witch trials, an oral pact left evidence in the form of the Witches' mark, an indelible mark where the marked person had been touched by the devil to seal the pact. The mark could be used as a proof to determine that the pact was made. It was also believed that on the spot where the mark was left, the marked person could feel no pain. A written pact consists in the same forms of attracting the demon, but includes a written act, usually signed with the conjurer's blood (although sometimes it was also alleged that the whole act had to be written with blood; meanwhile some demonologists defended the idea of using red ink instead of blood and others suggested the use of animal blood instead of human blood).

These acts present themselves as diabolical pacts, though there is not always certainty of an actor's authentic sanity. Usually the acts included strange characters that were said to be the signature of a demon, and each one had his own sigil. Books like The Lesser Key of Solomon (also known as Lemegeton Clavicula Salomonis) give a detailed list of these signs, known as diabolical signatures.

The Malleus Maleficarum discusses several alleged instances of pacts with the Devil, especially concerning women. It was considered that all witches and warlocks had made a pact with one of the demons, usually Satan.

According to demonology, there is a specific month, day of the week, and hour to call each demon, so the invocation for a pact has to be done at the right time. Also, as each demon has a specific function, a certain demon is invoked depending on what the conjurer is going to ask.

In the narrative of the Synoptic Gospels, Jesus is offered a series of bargains by the devil, in which he is promised worldly riches and glory in exchange for serving the devil rather than God. Upon rejecting the devil's overtures, he embarks on his travels as the Messiah.

== Theophilus of Adana ==
The first instance in Western religion, literature, or lore of a person trading his or her soul to the devil in exchange for worldly benefit is the story of Theophilus of Adana. According to the legend, Theophilus was an unhappy and despairing cleric, disappointed in his worldly career by his bishop, who sells his soul to the devil but is redeemed by the Virgin Mary. His story appears in a Greek version of the 6th century written by a "Eutychianus" who claims to have been a member of the household in question.

A 9th-century Miraculum Sancte Marie de Theophilo penitente inserts a Virgin as intermediary with diabolus, his "patron", providing the prototype of a closely linked series in the Latin literature of the West.

In the 10th century, the poet nun Hrotsvitha adapted the text of Paul the Deacon for a narrative poem that elaborates Theophilus' essential goodness and internalises the seduction of good and evil, in which the devil is magus, a necromancer. As in her model, Theophilus receives back his contract from the devil, displays it to the congregation, and soon dies.

A long poem on the subject by Gautier de Coincy (1177/8–1236), entitled Le miracle de Théophile: ou comment Théophile vint à la pénitence provided material for a 13th-century play by Rutebeuf, Le Miracle de Théophile, where Theophilus is the central pivot in a frieze of five characters, the Virgin and the bishop flanking him on the side of good, the Jew and the devil on the side of evil.

== The Smith and the Devil ==
"The Smith and the Devil" is a fairy tale. The story is of a smith who makes a pact with a malevolent being—commonly the Devil (in later times), Death, a demon or a genie—selling his soul for some power, then tricks the devil out of his prize. In one version, the smith gains the power to weld any materials, then uses this power to stick the devil to an immovable object, allowing the smith to renege on the bargain. It is indexed as ATU 330.

== Alleged historical examples ==
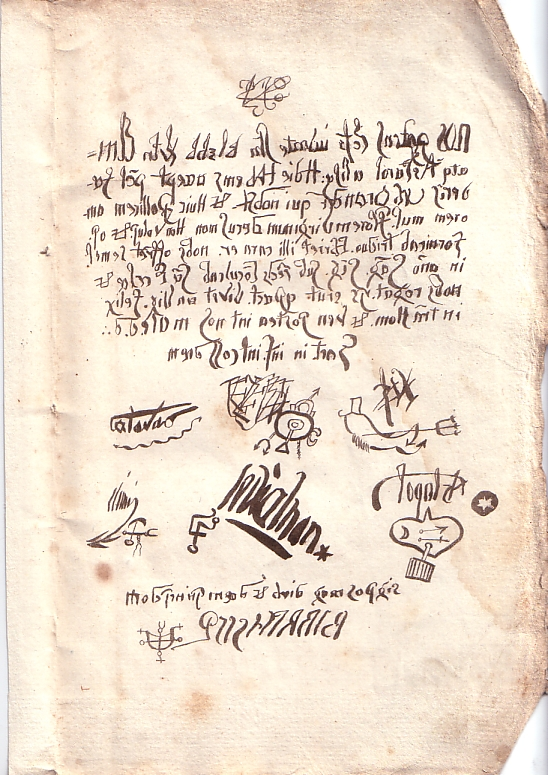
Urbain Grandier's pact

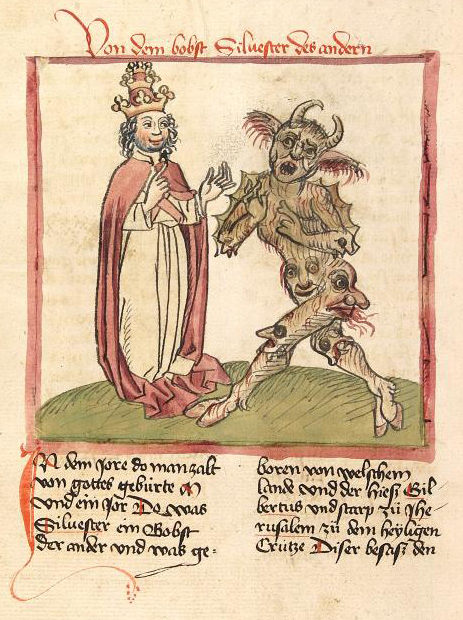
Pope Sylvester II and the devil in an illustration of c. 1460.

- An extensive legend of a supposed devilish pact was focused on the character of Pope Sylvester II (946–1003), a prominent and skilled scholar and scientist in his lifetime, who had studied mathematics and astrology in the then-Muslim cities of Córdoba and Seville. According to the legend, spread by William of Malmesbury and Cardinal Beno of Santi Martino e Silvestro, Sylvester II had also learned sorcery, using a book of spells stolen from an Arab philosopher. He had a pact with a female demon named Meridiana who appeared after he had been rejected by his earthly lover, and with whose help he managed to ascend to the papal throne (another legend tells that he won the papacy by playing dice with the devil).
- The Icelandic priest and scholar Sæmundur Sigfússon (1056–1133) was credited in Icelandic folklore with having made pacts with the devil and managing by various tricks to get the better of the deal. For example, in one famous story, Sæmundur made a pact with the devil that the devil should bring him home to Iceland from Europe on the back of a seal. Sæmundur escaped a diabolical end when, on arrival, he hit the seal on the head with the Christian Bible, killing it, and stepping safely ashore. (see Sæmundr fróði).
- According to a medieval legend associated with the Codex Gigas, the scribe was a monk who broke his monastic vows and was sentenced to be walled up alive. In order to avoid this harsh penalty, he promised to create in one night a book to glorify the monastery forever, including all human knowledge. Near midnight, he became sure that he could not complete this task alone, so he made a special prayer, not addressed to God but to the fallen angel Lucifer, asking him to help him finish the book in exchange for his soul. The devil completed the manuscript, and the monk added the devil's picture out of gratitude for his aid.
- Johann Georg Faust (1466/80–1541), whose life was the origin of the Faust legend.
- John Fian (executed on 27 January 1591), a doctor and school teacher who was declared a notorious sorcerer. He confessed to having a compact with Satan during the North Berwick witch trials in Scotland, which he confessed to King James as the trial proceedings were taking place, but later promised that he would renounce his compact with Satan and vow to lead the life of a Christian. The next morning, he confessed that the devil came to him in his cell dressed all in black and holding a white wand, demanding Fian continue his faithful service, according to his first oath and promise. Fian testified that he renounced Satan to his face, saying, "Get thee behind me, thou Satan, and start pushing, for I have listened too much to thee, and by the same thou hast undone me, in respect whereof I will utterly undo you." He confessed that the devil then answered, "That once ere thou die thou shall be mine." The devil afterwards broke the white wand, and immediately vanished from his sight. He was then given a chance to lead the life he promised, but the same night, he stole a key to his cell and escaped. He was eventually captured and tortured until his execution.
- Urbain Grandier (1590–1634), a 17th-century French priest, who was tried and burned at the stake for witchcraft. One of the documents presented at his trial was a diabolical pact he supposedly signed, which also bears what are supposed to be the seals of several demons, including that of Satan himself.
- Christoph Haizmann (1651/2–1700), a 17th-century painter from Bavaria, allegedly signed two pacts to be a "bounden son" to the devil in 1668.
- Bernard Fokke, a 17th-century captain for the Dutch East India Company, renowned for his uncanny speed from the Dutch Republic to Java, which led to legends that he was in league with the devil. He is also alleged to be the model for the ghostly captain of the Flying Dutchman.
- Jonathan Moulton (1726–1787), an 18th-century brigadier general of the New Hampshire Militia, was alleged to have sold his soul to the devil to have his boots filled with gold coins when hung by the fireplace every month.
- Giuseppe Tartini (8 April 1692–26 February 1770), Venetian violinist and composer, who believed that his Devil's Trill Sonata was inspired by the devil's appearance before him in a dream.
- Niccolò Paganini (27 October 1782–27 May 1840), an Italian violinist who may not have started the rumour but played along with it.
- Philippe Musard (1793–1859), French composer and, more importantly, orchestra leader, whose wild conducting and sensuous concerts generated the rumour while a celebrity in Paris in the 1830s.
- Tommy Johnson (1896–1 November 1956), blues musician. According to his brother, he claimed to have made a pact with the devil at a crossroads as part of his sinister persona.
- Robert Johnson (8 May 1911–6 August 1938), blues musician, who legend claims met Satan at a crossroads and signed over his soul to play the blues and gain mastery of the guitar. This is likely a conflation between him and Tommy Johnson, although the two were unrelated.
- Infernus (born on 18 June 1972), black metal musician; unlike most claims, it is Infernus himself who directly claims he sold his soul to the Devil. According to the official website for Infernus' band Gorgoroth, Infernus founded the band "[a]fter making a pact with the Devil in 1992". Infernus is also on record (including in Newsweek magazine) publicly stating that he worships Satan.

== Metaphor ==
The term "a deal with the Devil" (or "Faustian bargain") is also used metaphorically to condemn a person or persons perceived as having cooperated with an evil person or organisation. An example of this is the Jewish lawyer Rudolf Kasztner negotiating a deal with Nazi leader Adolf Eichmann, architect of the Holocaust, to allow a select group of Jews to escape Hungary and go to Switzerland for a fee. Under Jewish law, the principle of pikuach nefesh ("saving life") is an obligation to compromise one's principles in order to preserve human life, but the morals of Kasztner's deal remain debated.

== See also ==
- Deals with the Devil in popular culture
- Daniel Salthenius
- Demonic possession
- Devil in popular culture
- Devil's Bridge
- Fall of man
- Freischütz
- Oh, God! film trilogy
- Osculum infame
- Pact ink
- Pan Twardowski
- Works based on Faust
  - Mephistopheles in the arts and popular culture
- Drak (mythology)
