= Institutum clericorum saecularium in communi viventium =

An Institutum clericorum saecularium in communi viventium is a secular institute for priests who want to live an apostolic life in community. It is a form of association within the Roman Catholic Church.

They were called Bartholomites. Two different historical institutes have existed:

- Bartholomites: founded in the 13th century in Italy by Armenian monks
- Bartholomites or United Brethren: founded in the 17th century by Bartholomew Holzhauser
