= Węgrów Ghetto =

Nazi Jewish ghetto in Poland

The Węgrów Ghetto in Węgrów, Poland existed during 1941–1943. It was established in the Jewish quarter of Węgrów. Before the war the population of the quarter was estimated 7,500-8,500 (of the total population of about 13,000). With the establishment of the ghetto their number increased to about 9,000-11,000 due to deportations of the Jews from the surrounding areas.

== History ==
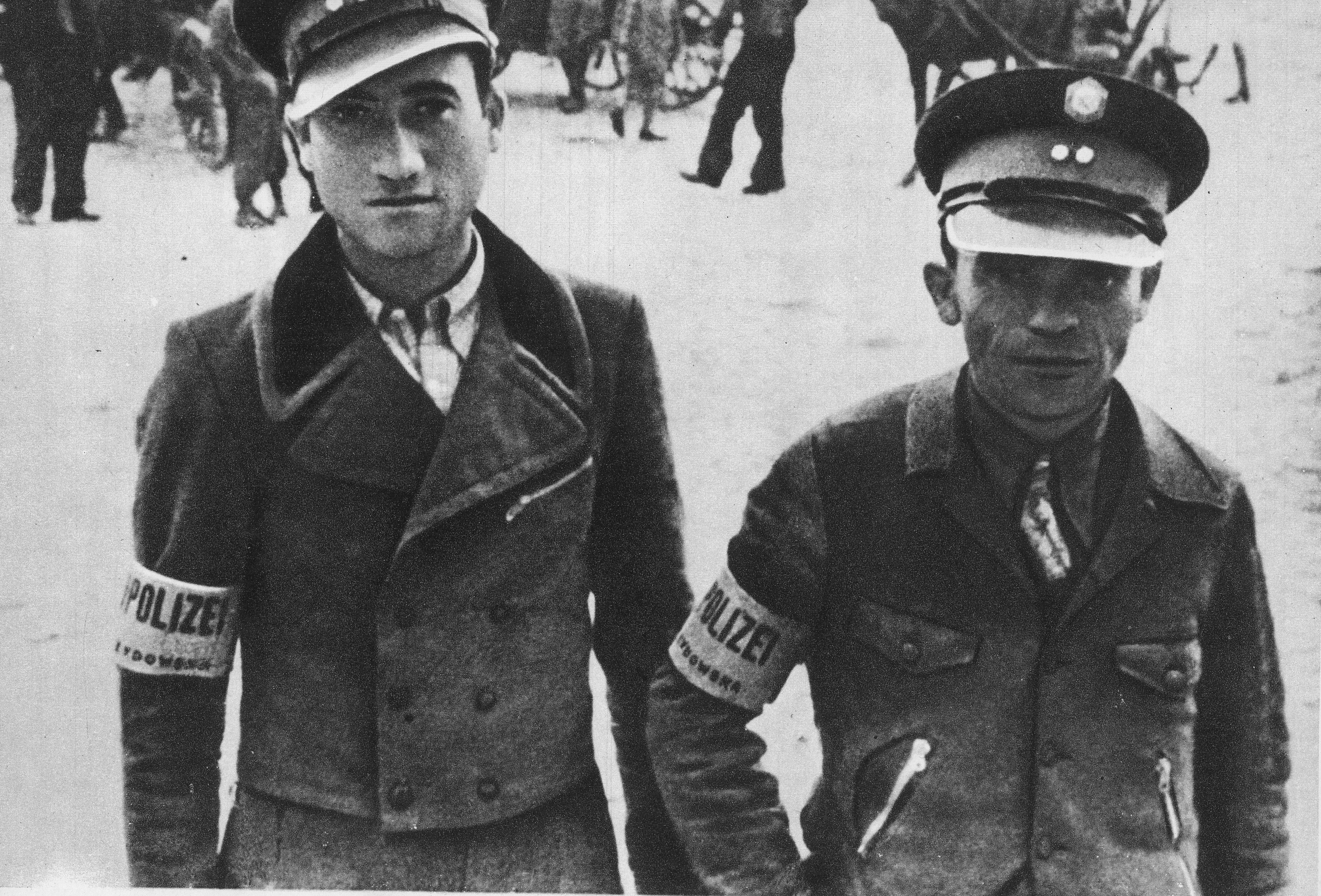
Jewish Ghetto Police, Węgrów

In September 1939 the Judenrat was established in Węgrów, headed by Mordechaj Zejman. In December 1940 the actual ghetto territory was delineated, into which all Jews were to resettle. The ghetto was not fenced, but the Jews were allowed to move only in the designated streets.

Most of the ghetto was liquidated on September 22, 1942 (which was the Yom Kippur day) as part of the Operation Reinhard: the Jews were transported to Treblinka II, while about 2,000 resisting the deportation were killed. Some of them managed to escape in the nearby forests, still others went in hiding. Within several days some 1,400 fugitives were found and executed at the Jewish cemetery. A group of Jews were left to make the ghetto area habitable for non-Jews. They were executed on April 30, 1943. Estimated 8,500 Jews were transported to Treblinka II.

Estimated only about 100-200 Węgrów Jews survived (after the war about 200 Jews reported Węgrów as their place of residence in 1939), and most of them left Poland after the war.
