= Basilica of the Assumption, Węgrów =

Coordinates: 52°23′55.91″N 22°01′10.27″E

Basilica of the Assumption in Węgrów
- Basilica of the Assumption of the Blessed Virgin Mary
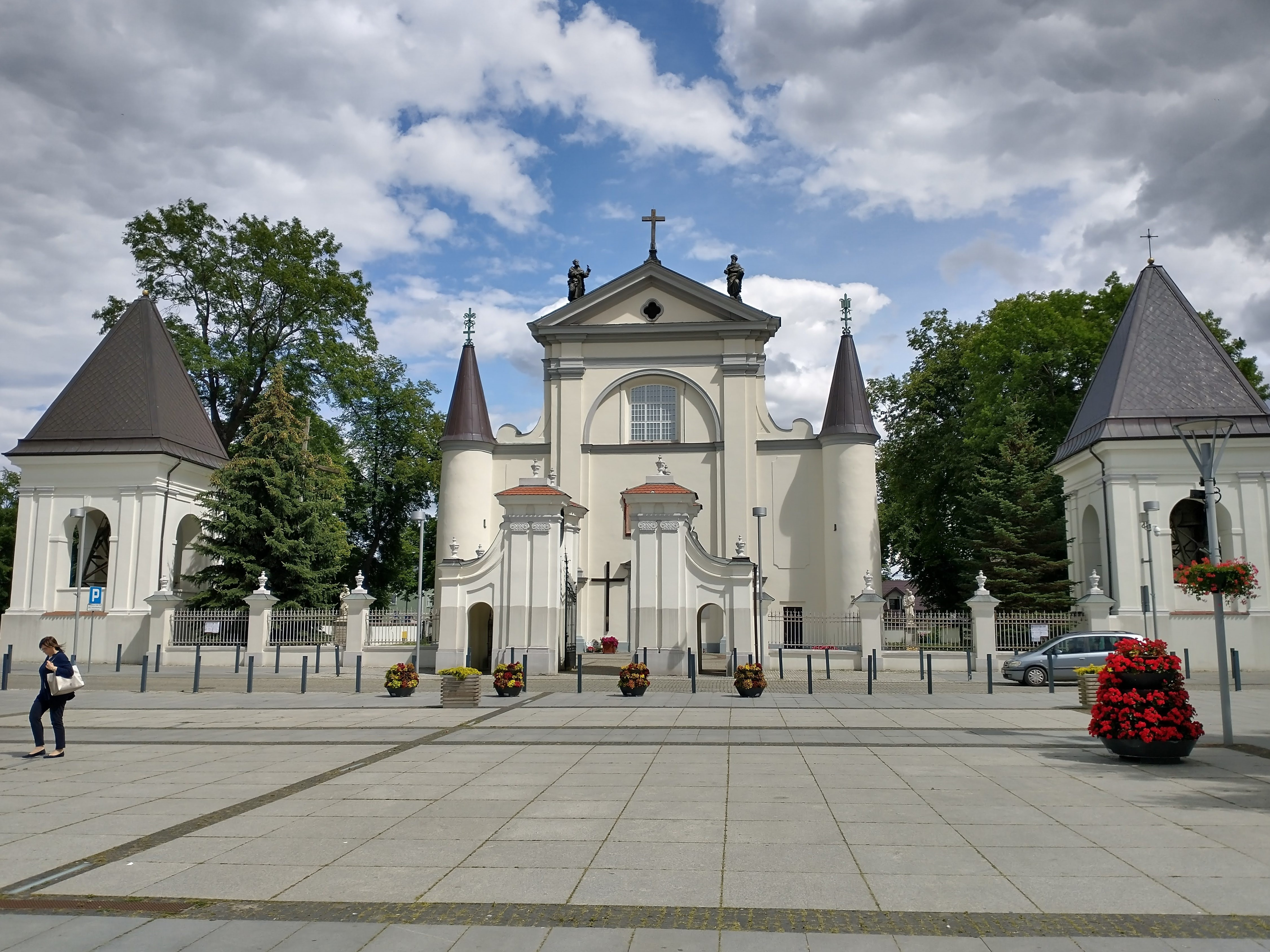
- Basilica of the Assumption in Węgrów
- Address: Strażacka 5, 07-100
- Country: Poland
- Denomination: Catholic

History
- Status: Minor basilica, Collegiate church, Marian shrine
- Dedication: Assumption of Mary, Saint Peter, Paul the Apostle, Andrew the Apostle, Catherine of Alexandria
- Consecrated: 1711

Architecture
- Architect: Tylman van Gameren
- Architectural type: Gothic, Baroque
- Completed: 1706

Specifications
- Materials: Brick

Administration
- Diocese: Drohiczyn
- Parish: Parish of the Assumption of the Blessed Virgin Mary in Węgrów

The Basilica of the Assumption of the Blessed Virgin Mary is a parish and collegiate church located in Węgrów, Poland. It has held the title of minor basilica since 1997.

== History ==
The first parish church in Węgrów was founded in 1414 by Piotr Pilik of the Rogala coat of arms. In 1509, another parish church dedicated to Saint Barbara was founded.

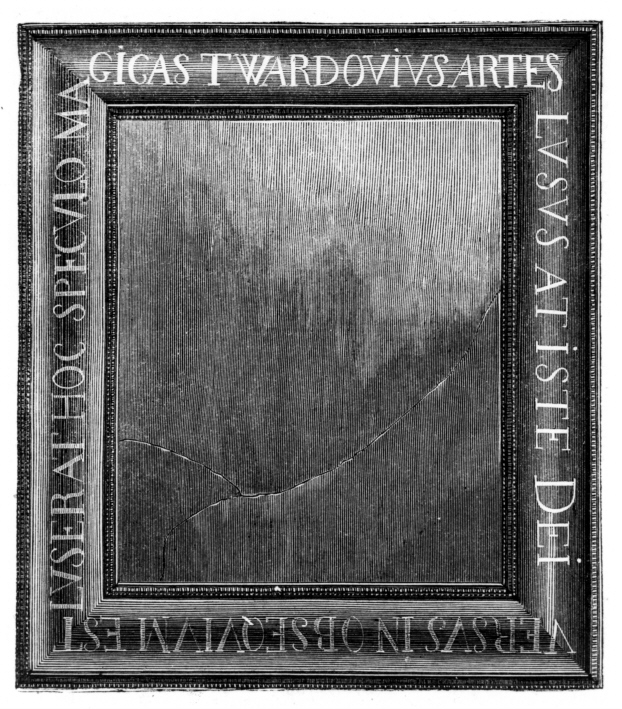
Twardowski's Mirror

The current parish church was likely built in the Gothic style in the first half of the 16th century, funded by the Kiszka family. In 1558, Anna Radziwiłłówna Kiszczyna, a promoter and protector of Protestantism in the Grand Duchy of Lithuania, took the church from the Catholics, removed the parish priest, and handed over the newly built temple to the Calvinist congregation she founded. Through the efforts of Jan Kiszka and the Węgrów pastor Piotr of Goniądz, the church came under the control of the Polish Brethren congregation in 1565. However, it returned to the hands of the Reformed Evangelicals in 1592.

In 1630, the parish church was returned to the Catholics. In 1703, during the Great Northern War, the temple burned down. It was rebuilt in the Baroque style according to the design of Tylman van Gameren by architects Carlo Ceroni and Jan Reisner. In 1707, the Bartolomites took over the care of the parish and the church. The new church was consecrated in 1711 by the Bishop of Lutsk, Aleksander Benedykt Wyhowski.

In 1839, after the dissolution of the Bartolomite college in Węgrów, the Bartolomite priests left, and the temple was handed over to the diocesan clergy.

On September 9, 1939, the church was bombed. It remained closed throughout World War II. After the war ended, its sacred functions were restored.

On December 24, 1992, the Bishop of Drohiczyn, Władysław Jędruszuk, established a chapter at the church and designated the temple as a collegiate church of the Drohiczyn diocese. On February 28, 1996, Bishop Antoni Pacyfik Dydycz declared the collegiate church a Marian sanctuary under diocesan law. On April 4, 1997, Pope John Paul II designated the Węgrów collegiate church as a minor basilica.
