= Pan Twardowski =

Character in Polish folklore

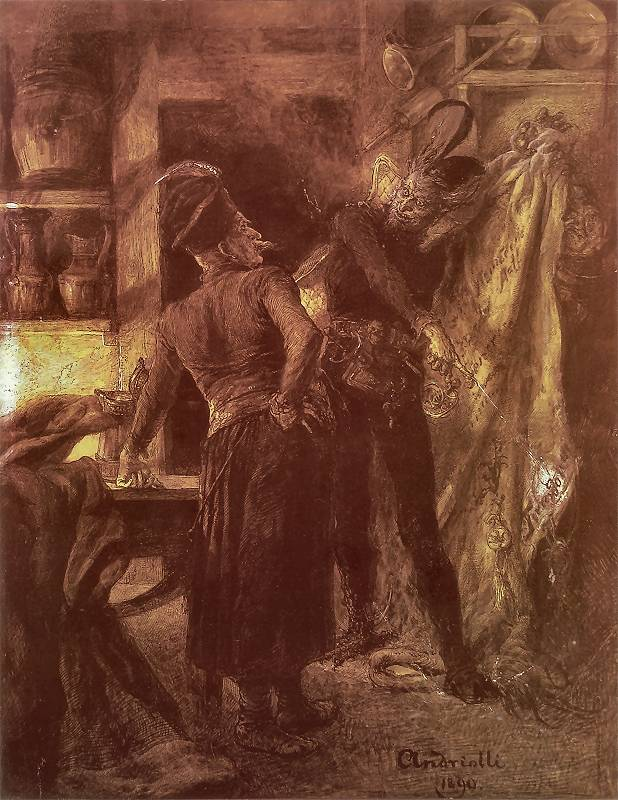
Pan Twardowski and the devil. Drawing by Michał Elwiro Andriolli.

Sir Twardowski (Polish: Pan Twardowski [ˈpan tfarˈdɔfskʲi]), also known as Master Twardowski (Polish: Mistrz Twardowski), is a sorcerer in Polish folklore and literature who made a deal with the Devil. Twardowski sold his soul in exchange for special powers – such as being able to summon for King Sigismund Augustus the spirit of his deceased wife – and eventually met a tragic fate.

The tale of Twardowski exists in various versions, and forms the basis for many works of fiction, including the humorous ballad "Pani Twardowska" by Adam Mickiewicz. Like the legend of Faust, it has been linked to the older Indo-European motif of The Smith and the Devil later reshaped in Christian Europe as stories of pacts with the Devil.

== Legend ==
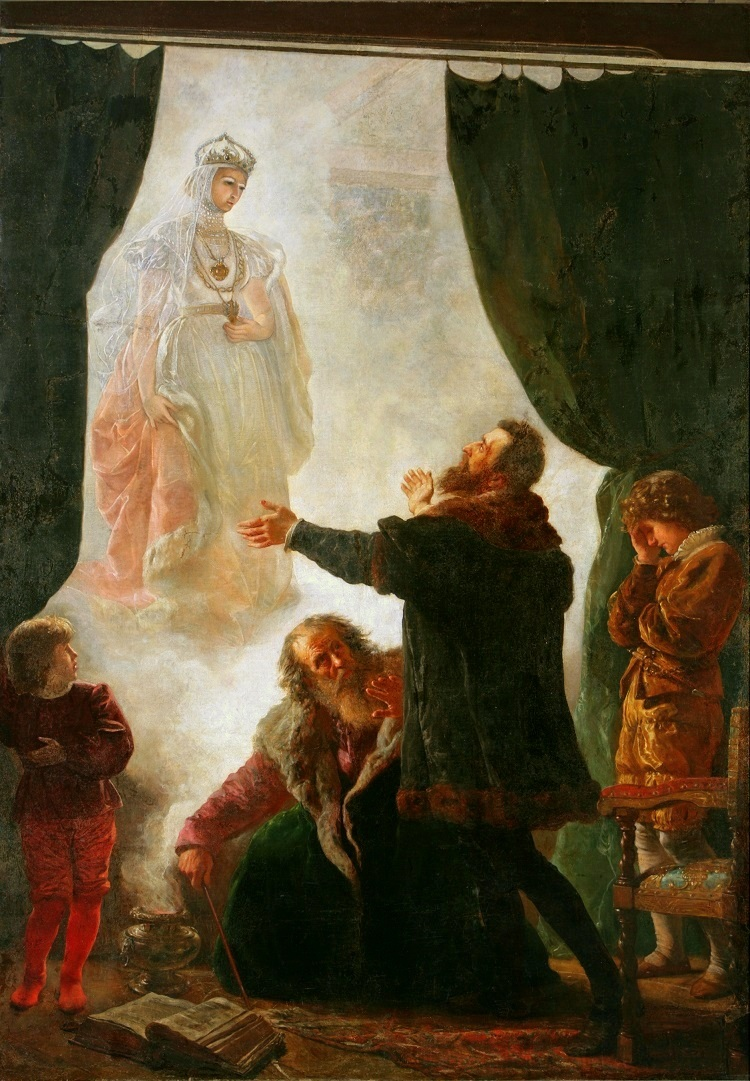
Pan Twardowski summoning Barbara Radziwiłł's ghost for King Sigismund Augustus. Painting by Wojciech Gerson.

According to an old legend, Twardowski was a nobleman (szlachcic) who lived in Kraków in the 16th century. He sold his soul to the devil in exchange for great knowledge and magical powers. However, Twardowski wanted to outwit the devil by including a special clause in the contract, stating that the devil could only take Twardowski's soul to Hell during his visit to Rome – a place the sorcerer never intended to go. Other variants of the story have Twardowski being sold to the devil as a child by his father.

With the devil's aid, Twardowski quickly rose to wealth and fame, eventually becoming a courtier of King Sigismund Augustus, who sought consolation in magic and astrology after the death of his beloved wife, Barbara Radziwiłł. He was said to have summoned the ghost of the late queen to comfort the grieving monarch, using a magic mirror. The sorcerer also wrote two books, both dictated to him by the devil – a book on magic and an encyclopedia.

After years of evading his fate, Twardowski was eventually tricked by the devil and caught not in the city, but at an inn called Rzym (Rome in Polish). While being spirited away, Twardowski started to pray to the Virgin Mary, who made the devil drop his victim midway to hell. Twardowski fell on the Moon where he lives to this day. His only companion is his sidekick whom he once turned into a spider; from time to time Twardowski lets the spider descend to Earth on a thread and bring him news from the world below.

== Historical Twardowski ==
Dr. Jan Kuchta in his 1935 doctoral thesis "Cracovian Warlock of XVI Century. Master Twardowski" suggested that Twardowski may have been a German nobleman who was born in Nuremberg and studied in Wittenberg before coming to Kraków. His name Lorenz Dhur was Latinised to Laurentius Durus and in turn rendered as Twardowski in Polish; durus and twardy mean "hard" in Latin and Polish respectively. There is also some speculation that this legend was inspired by the life of either John Dee or his associate Edward Kelley, both of whom lived for a time in Kraków.

"Pan" – used in modern Polish as a universal honorific and polite form of address – at the time the tale developed, was reserved for members of the nobility (szlachta) and was roughly equivalent to the English "Sir" (see Polish name), but in the English language "Sir" is used before a man's given name (e.g., "Sir Isaac") or his complete name (e.g., "Sir Isaac Newton"), not before his surname only (e.g., "Sir Newton").

Twardowski's given name is sometimes given as Jan (John), though most versions of the tale do not mention a given name. Pan Twardowski may have been confused with the Polish Catholic priest writer, Jan Twardowski.

== Twardowski in literature, music, film and gaming ==
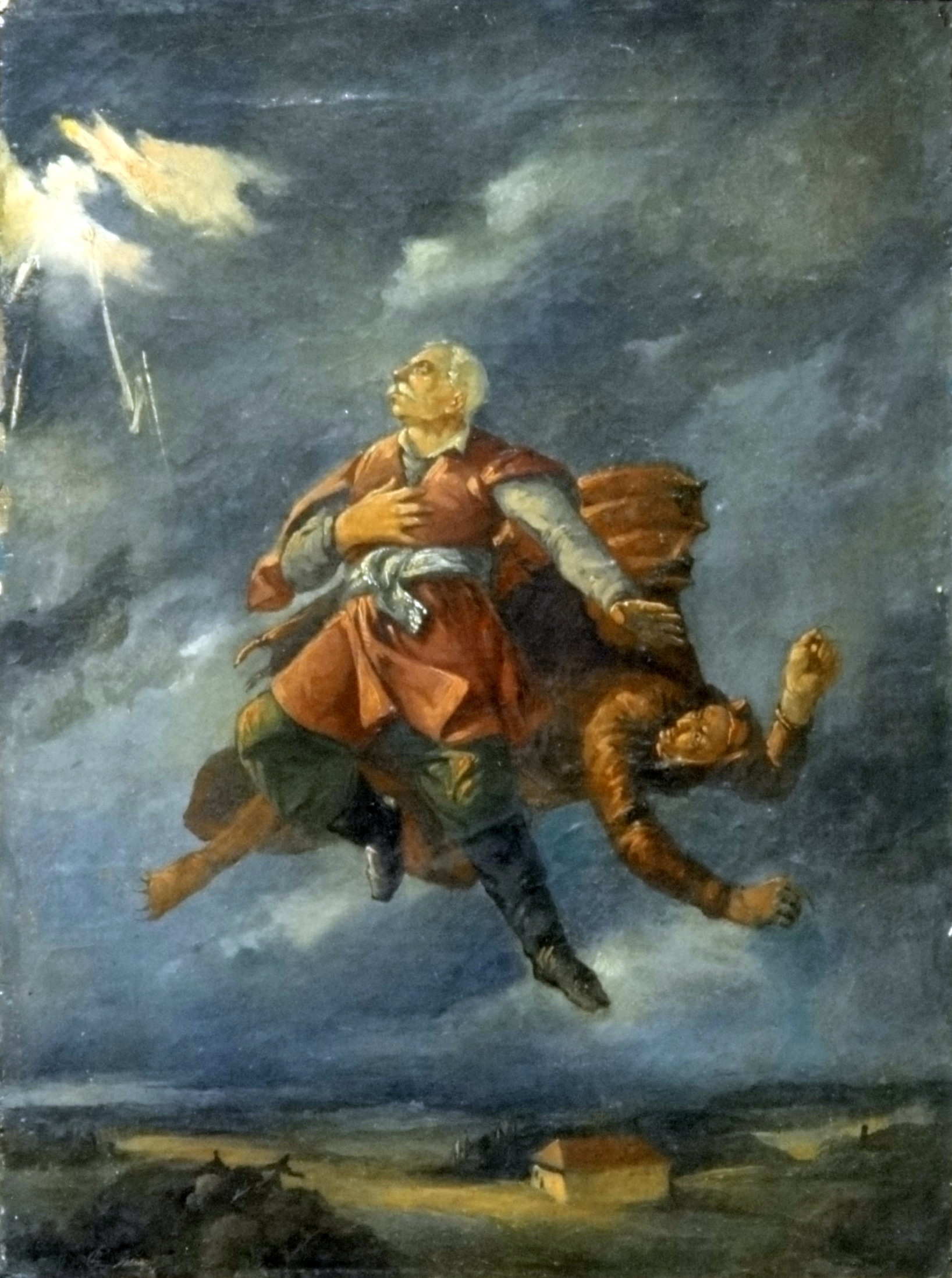
Pan Twardowski Abducted by the Devil. Painting by Ignacy Gierdziejewski.

The legend of Pan Twardowski has inspired a great many Polish, Czech, Ukrainian, Russian, and German poets, novelists, composers, directors, and other artists.

One of the best known literary works featuring Pan Twardowski is the humorous ballad Pani Twardowska by Adam Mickiewicz (1822). In this version of the story, Twardowski agrees to be taken to Hell on condition that the Devil spends a year living with his wife, Pani Twardowska. The Devil, however, prefers to run away and thus Pan Twardowski is saved. In 1869 Stanisław Moniuszko wrote music for the ballad.

Other works based on the legend include:

- Pan Tvardovsky, an opera by Alexey Verstovsky, libretto by Mikhail Zagoskin (1828);
- Pan Tvardovsky, Zagoskin's short story from the collection An Evening on the Khopyor (1834);
- Mistrz Twardowski [Master Twardowski], a novel by Józef Ignacy Kraszewski (1840);
- Tvardovsky, a ballad by Semen Hulak-Artemovsky;
- Pan Twardowski, a ballet by Adolf Gustaw Sonnenfeld (1874);
- Pan Tvardovski, an opera by Ivan Zajc (1880);
- Twardowski, a poem by Jaroslav Vrchlický (1885);
- Mistrz Twardowski, a poem by Leopold Staff (1902);
- Pan Twardowski, a ballad by Lucjan Rydel (1906);
- Pan Tvardovsky, a film by Ladislas Starevich (1917);
- Pan Twardowski, a ballet by Ludomir Różycki (1921);
- Pan Twardowski, a film by Wiktor Biegański (1921);
- Pan Twardowski, czarnoksiężnik polski [Pan Twardowski, a Polish sorcerer], a novel by Wacław Sieroszewski (1930);
- Pan Twardowski, a film by Henryk Szaro, screenplay by Wacław Gąsiorowski (1936);
- Pan Twardowski oder Der Polnische Faust [Pan Twardowski or The Polish Faust], a novel by Matthias Werner Kruse (1981);
- Dzieje Mistrza Twardowskiego (The Story of Master Twardowski), a film by Krzysztof Gradowski (1995).
- Twardowsky, a short sci-fi film from Polish Legends series directed by Tomasz Bagiński (2015)
- Hearts of Stone, an expansion to RPG game The Witcher 3: Wild Hunt (2015), has a main storyline heavily inspired by the legend.
- Valentina twist, a song by Edita Piekha (1965) mention Pan Twardowski ;

Pan Twardowski is also a popular character in the folk art of Poland's Kraków region; he appears in some Kraków Nativity scenes (szopki). He is typically depicted as a Polish noble either riding a rooster or standing on the Moon.

== Places associated with Pan Twardowski ==
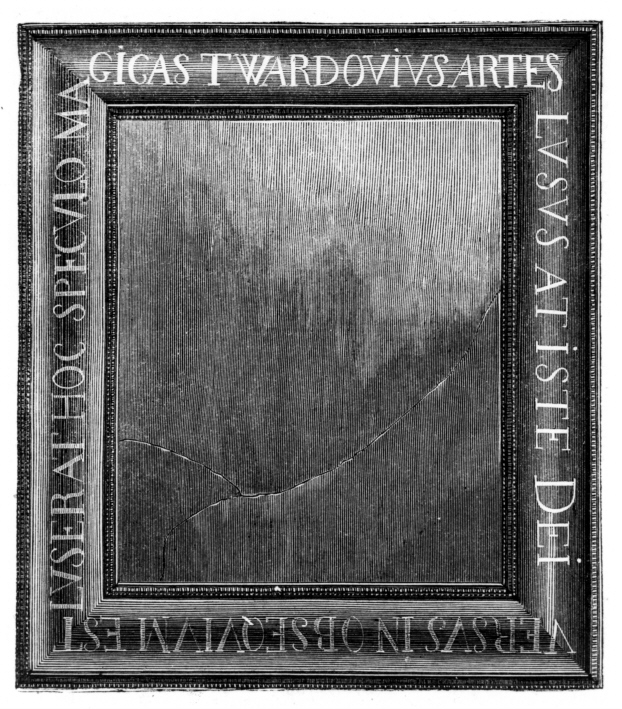
Twardowski's Magic Mirror

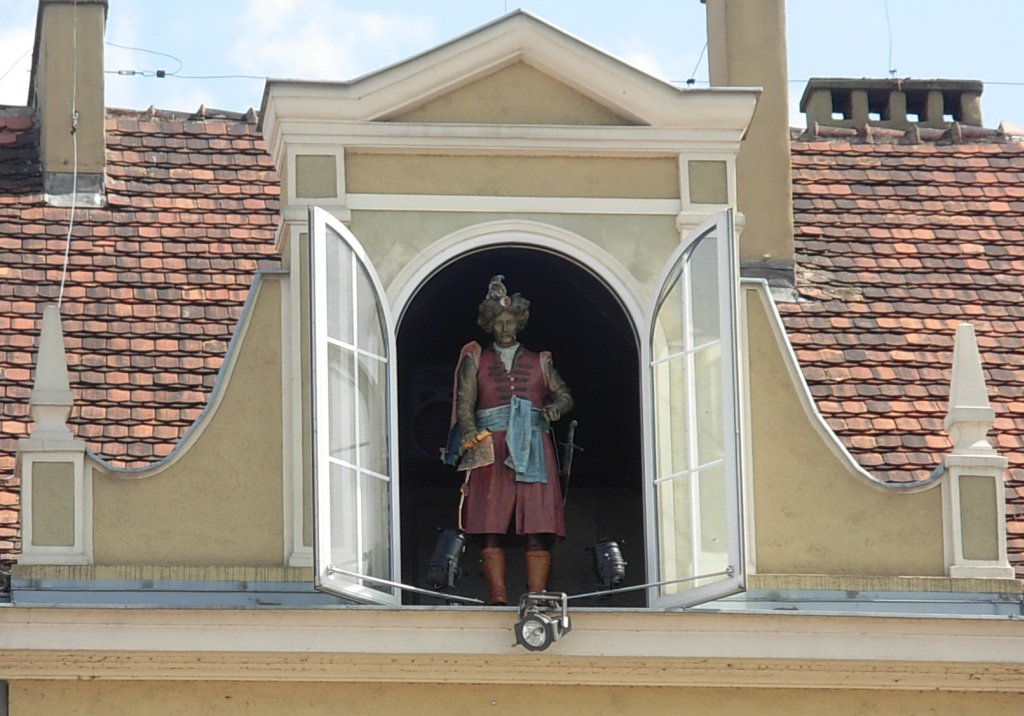
Pan Twardowski statue in Bydgoszcz

Pan Twardowski is said to have lived in or near Kraków, the capital of Poland at the time. Different places in Kraków claim to be the exact location of Twardowski's house. The sorcerer might have lived either somewhere in the city center, near the Rynek Główny or Ulica Grodzka, or across the River Vistula in the village of Krzemionki (now part of Kraków).

Across Poland, there are various inns and pubs called Rzym ("Rome"), all of which claim to be the one where Pan Twardowski met the devil. The oldest of these inns date back to only the late 17th century, about 100 years after Twardowski's time. The one in Sucha is probably the best known of these inns.

In the sacristy of a church in Węgrów, hangs a polished metal plate claimed to be the magic mirror which once belonged to Pan Twardowski. According to a legend, it was possible to see future events reflected in the mirror until it was broken in 1812 by Emperor Napoléon Bonaparte of France when he saw in it his future retreat from Russia and collapse of his empire.

It is also said that Pan Twardowski spent some time in the city of Bydgoszcz, where, in his memory, a figure was recently mounted in a window of a tenement, overseeing the Old Town. At 1:13 p.m. and 9:13 p.m. the window opens and Pan Twardowski appears, to the accompaniment of weird music and devilish laughter. He takes a bow, waves his hand, and then disappears. This little show gathers crowds of amused spectators.

== See also ==
- Faust
- Pan Tadeusz
- Simon Magus
- The Smith and the Devil
- Theophilus of Adana
