= The Smith and the Devil =

Fairy tale

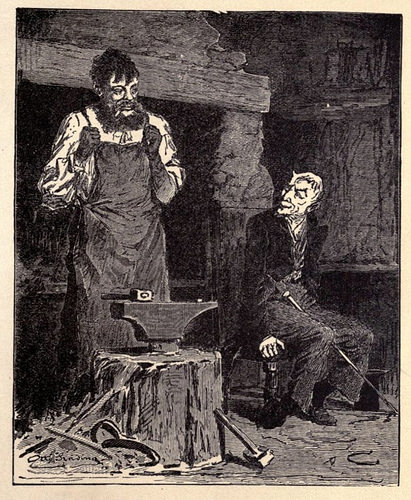
- Illustration for the folk tale The Smith and the Devil, ink drawing, 1916

Folk tale
- Name: The Smith and the Devil
- Aarne–Thompson grouping: ATU 330

"The Smith and the Devil" is a fairy tale. The story is of a smith who makes a pact with a malevolent being—commonly the Devil (in later times), Death, a demon or a genie—selling his soul for some power, then tricks the devil out of his prize. In one version, the smith gains the power to weld any materials, then uses this power to stick the devil to an immovable object, allowing the smith to renege on the bargain. It is indexed as ATU 330.

== History ==
The tale was collected by the Brothers Grimm in their Children's and Household Tales (published in two volumes in 1812 and 1815), although they removed it in editions of 1822 and later, substituting "Brother Lustig" and relegating references to it to the notes for "Gambling Hansel", a very similar tale. Edith Hodgetts' 1891 book Tales and Legends from the Land of the Tsar collects a Russian version, while Ruth Manning-Sanders included a Gascon version as "The Blacksmith and the Devil" in her 1970 book A Book of Devils and Demons. Richard Chase presents a version from the Southern Appalachians, called "Wicked John and the Devil." In 1974, a book of fairy tales from Kashubia (northern Poland) was released, which featured a Kashubian version of The Smith and the Devil called O kowalu, śmierci i diable; it was collected and written down by Edmund Puzdrowski.

== Interpretations ==
According to George Monbiot, the blacksmith is a motif of folklore throughout (and beyond) Europe associated with malevolence (the medieval vision of Hell may draw upon the image of the smith at his forge), and several variant tales tell of smiths entering into a pact with the devil to obtain fire and the means of smelting metal.

According to research applying phylogenetic techniques to linguistics by folklorist Sara Graça da Silva and anthropologist Jamie Tehrani, "The Smith and the Devil" may be one of the oldest European folk tales, with the basic plot stable throughout the Indo-European-speaking world from India to Scandinavia, possibly being first told in Proto-Indo-European 6,000 years ago in the Bronze Age. Folklorist John Lindow, however, notes that a word for "smith" may not have existed in Proto-Indo-European, and if so the tale may not be that old. However, according to historical linguist Václav Blažek: "The apparent fact, that there is no common designation of "smith" in the Indo-European lexicon, could be disappointing at first sight, but the same may be said about other crafts, including those using more 'archaic' technologies than smithery." According to Blažek, the inherited designations for smith attested in the mythological context are "a witness of a remarkably important role of the institution of smithery in the period of disintegration of the Indo-European dialect continuum".

== See also ==
- Errementari, a 2017 film based on a Basque version of the tale
- Faust, a German legend also involving a pact with the devil
- Sir Twardowski, a Polish legend also involving a deal with the devil
- Stingy Jack
- Wayland the Smith, a European myth also involving a smith

== Bibliography ==
- Blažek, Václav (2010). Indo-European "Smith" and his Divine Colleagues. Washington, DC: Institute for the Study of Man. p. 120. ISBN 978-0-9845353-2-3.
