= Edith Hodgetts =

Edith M. S. Hodgetts
- Born: Russia
- Died: 1902; England
- Occupation: Author
- Writing career
- Language: Russian, English
- Period: 19th century
- Genre: Children's literature
- Subject: Russian folk stories

Edith M. S. Hodgetts (died 1902) was a Russian-born British writer of children's stories, folk tales, and fairy tales.

== Biography ==
She was born in Russia, where she spent her childhood, and was god daughter to Michael Nicolaevitch and Sophie Nicolaevna. Later she moved to England.

She is best known for her book Tales and Legends from the Land of the Tzar, a collection of Russian fairy tales first published in 1890 in London. It was reprinted in 1891, 1892, 1972, 1974, 1983, 2013, 2015 and 2017.

In the introduction to her book, Hodgett says the stories were originally sourced from her childhood - as dictated to her at school and told to her by her nanny and household servants - as well as translated from Russian collections.

The book is dedicated:

To their Excellencies Michael Nicolaevitch and Sophie Nicolaevna de Kapoustine, this little book is most affectionately dedicated by the translator, their god-daughter, Edith.

Two of the Russian stories, The Blacksmith and the Devil and The Wonderful Trade, were republished in a 2017 anthology called The Sorcerer's Apprentice: An Anthology of Magical Tales by Jack Zipes, published by Princeton University Press.

Other stories include Vaselesa the Beautiful, The Silver Plate and the Transparent Apple, The Soldier and the Demons, The Snow-Maiden, Jack Frost, Ivan and the Chestnut Horse, The Three Kopeks, The Red Flamingoes, The Witch and the Sister of the Sun, Princess Vera the Wise, Count Daniel Nathaniel, The Witch, Mary and Netty, The Robbers, Ivashko and the Witch, Prince Kid-Skin, Want, An Angry Wife, The Lucky Child, The Potter and the Evil Spirit, Princess Grey-Goose, The Grey Wolf and the Golden Cassowary, Starveling, King Vladimir and the Skeleton, The Quick Runner, Honesty and Dishonesty, Foma Berennekoff, The Roguish Peasant, A Hoax, The Wonderful Sailor, Senka the Little, Elie Muromitch, The King of the Sea and Melania the Clever, The Last of the Russian Warriors, "If you don't like it, don't listen, but don't spoil my lies", and The Little Brown Cow.

Thirty of the 38 Russian stories in this collection were new to English readers at the time of first publication.

== Sources ==
- Hodgetts, Edith M. S. (2005). Alan Hager, Christine L. Krueger, George Stade, and Karen Karbiener. ed. Encyclopedia of British Writers: 16th–20th Centuries (Encyclopedia of World Literature Series). New York: Facts on File. ISBN 9780816061426
