= Battle of Węgrów =

1863 battle during the January Uprising

Coordinates: 52°24′00″N 22°01′00″E

- Part of January Uprising
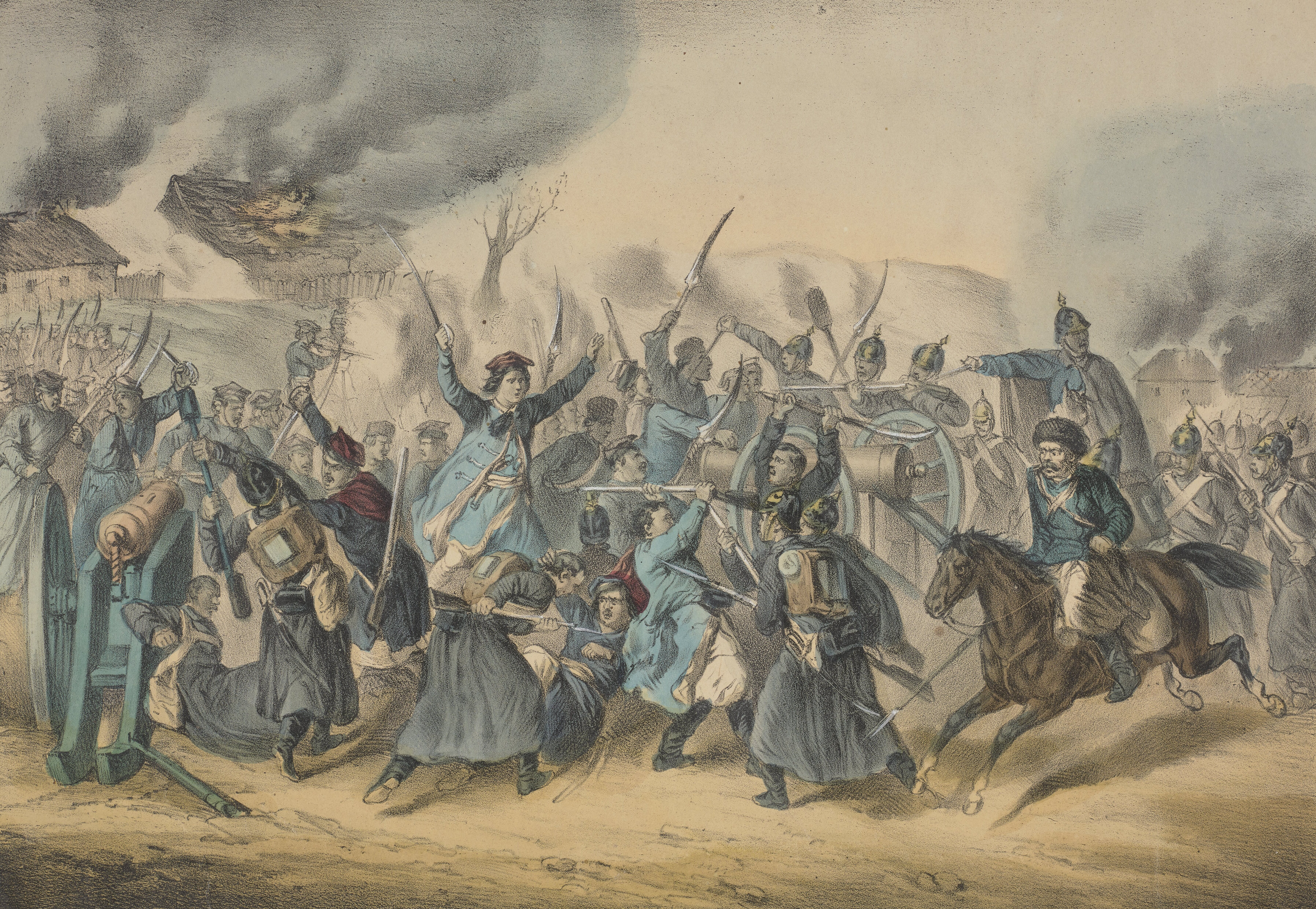
- The Battle of Wegrow, unknown artist
Date	3 February 1863
Location	Węgrów
Result	Polish victory
Territorial changes	Polish forces capture town and retreat

Belligerents
Polish National Government	Russian Empire

Commanders and leaders
Władysław Jabłonowski; Jan Matliński	Colonel Georgij Papaafanasopulo

Strength
3,500 infantry, mostly scythemen	In total 1,000 soldiers including: 3 companies of infantry, 3 squadrons of cavalry, 6 cannons

Casualties and losses
At Least 66 killed	According to Russian sources: 1 killed 5 wounded few horses

Battle of Węgrów was one of the most important skirmishes of January Uprising in the Russian Partition of Poland. It took place February 3, 1863, near Węgrów in east Masovia. On January 22, Polish partisans liberated a town from Russian forces. Here Poles established a military base, in a few days gathering almost 3,500 soldiers.

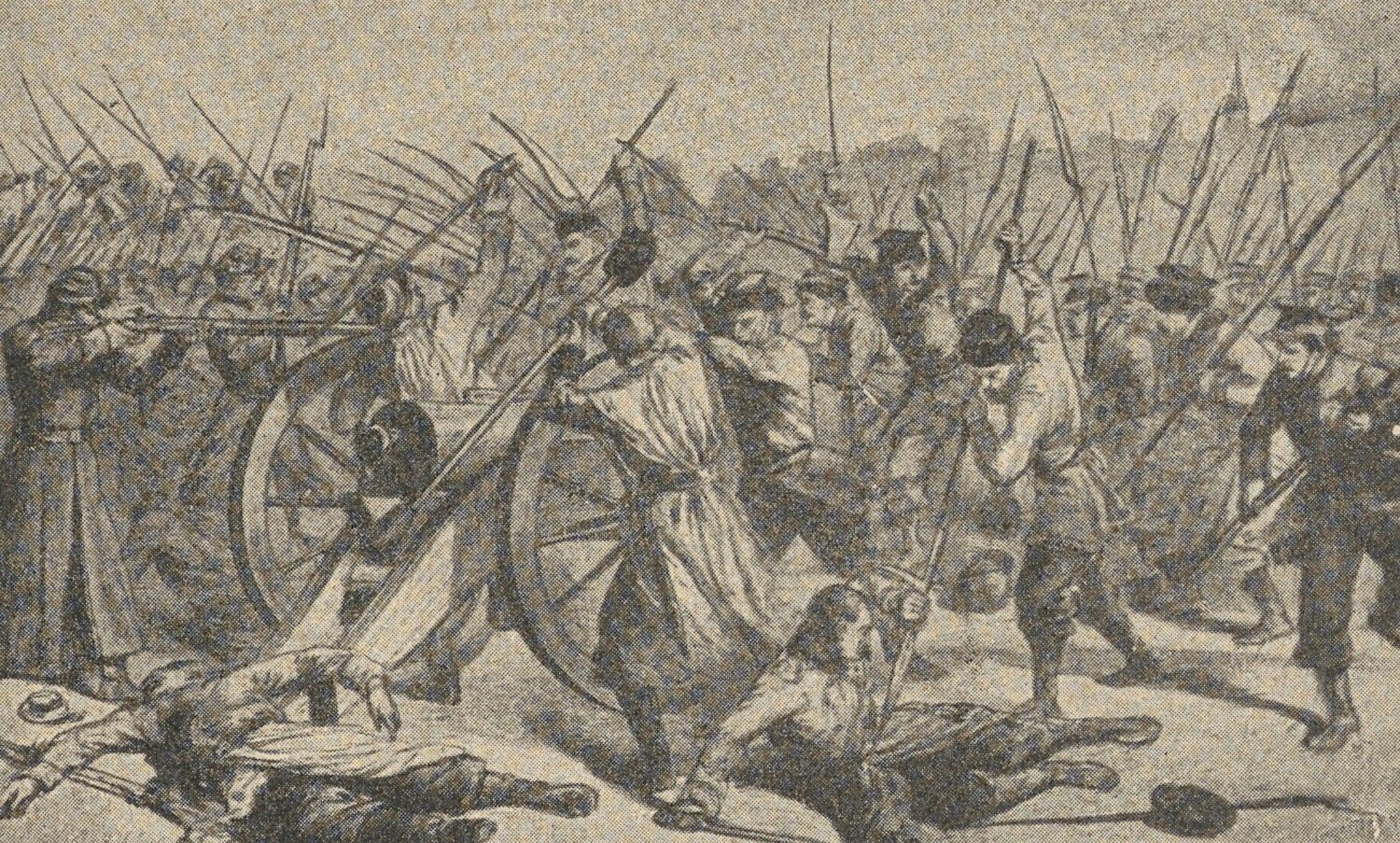
Battle of Węgrów - attack on cannons

The Russians decided to recapture Węgrów by rapid attack force composed of a 1,000-strong unit with artillery, led by colonel Georgi Papaafanasopulo. The Poles were threatened by encirclement, and Polish commander Jan Matliński ordered a retreat from the town. He left about 500 scythemen to cover the retreat of the main forces. Scythemen attacked the Russian left flank and routed Russian cavalry squadron and cannons, ensuring the safe retreat of the Polish forces from the town. Almost all attacking scythemen were killed by Russian infantry fire. Russians entered the town, but most of the Polish forces had already left it.

The Polish attack was heard of throughout Europe. French poet Henri Auguste Barbier wrote a poem Attack at Węgrów, comparing the Polish fighters to Spartans at the Battle of Thermopylae. The Polish poet Cyprian Kamil Norwid, writing in France, also compared the battle to Thermopylae. Maria Konopnicka also wrote a poem about the event, in which she referenced Barbier's work. As a result, the battle is sometimes called the "Polish Thermopylae." Italian author and patriot Filippo Meucci, who in 1849 had known the Poles who fought for the defense of the Roman Republic from the French invasion to restore the Pope's temporal rule, wrote the hymn "Alla Polonia (To Poland)", Ferrara 1863, to celebrate the 200 young Poles who gave their lives fighting against the Russians.
