= Le Miracle de Théophile =

13th century French miracle play

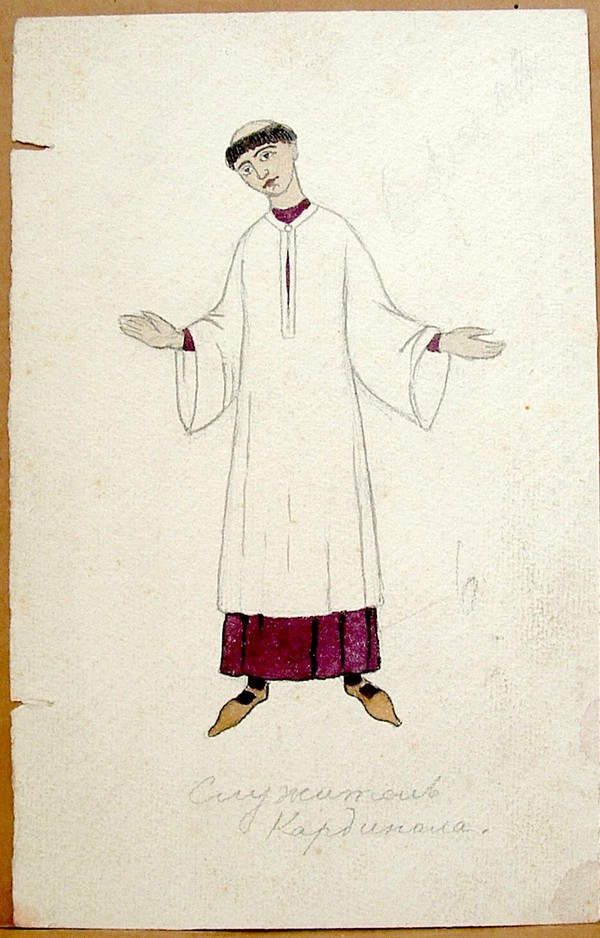
Costume by Ivan Bilibin

Le Miracle de Théophile (The Miracle of Theophilus) is a thirteenth-century miracle play written in langue d'oïl circa 1261 by the trouvère Rutebeuf.

The play is a religious drama, drawn from traditional accounts of the lives of the Saints and the Blessed Virgin Mary. In the play, Théophile sells his soul to the Devil. Overcome by remorse, he prays to the Virgin Mary, who delivers him from the cursed pact.

The play refers to the legendary history of St. Theophilus of Adana, who according to traditional saints' legends made a pact with the Devil and repented of it.

== Invocation ==
This play is the original source of an influential invocation to the Devil (in an unknown language). The original text from the French play is given to the character Salatin – apparently a version of Saladin – who in this play is labelled a sorcerer; Salatin uses these words to invoke the Devil:

(Ci conjure Salatins le deable.)

Bagahi laca bachahé,
Lamac cahi achabahé,

Karrelyos.

Lamac lamec bachalyos,
Cabahagi sabalyos,

Baryolas.

Lagozatha cabyolas,
Samahac et famyolas,

Harrahya.

Another French miracle play from the same time period by Jean Bodel, Jeu de Saint Nicolas, also contains an invocation to the Devil in an unknown language.

== In other media ==
Marcel Proust makes use of the imagery of this play in his novel Swann's Way, while mentioning workers toiling among statues of the main characters.
