= Wilhelm Volk =

Wilhelm Volk (January 25, 1804 - March 17, 1869) was a German writer. He used the pseudonym Ludwig Clarus.

Volk was born in Halberstadt, Germany. Volk studied law at the University of Göttingen and the University of Berlin. In 1855, he converted from Lutheranism to Catholicism. He was the author of a number of large works on the lives of the Catholic saints, and on Italian and Spanish literature. He died at Erfurt.
