= Theophilus of Adana =

Cleric in the sixth-century Church

Saint Theophilus of Adana
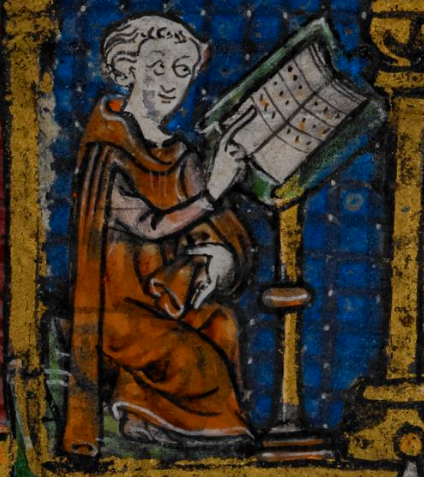
- Theophilus as an archdeacon

the Penitent
- Born: unknown Adana, Cilicia, Eastern Roman Empire (modern-day Adana, Turkey)
- Died: c. 538; Austrasia, Kingdom of the Franks
- Venerated in: Eastern Orthodox Church; Roman Catholic Church
- Canonized: Pre-congregation
- Feast: 23 June (Orthodox); February 4 (Roman Catholic)

Saint Theophilus the Penitent, also known as Theophilus of Cilicia or Theophilus of Adana (Greek: Θεόφιλος Άδανας, died c. 538) was a cleric in the sixth century Church who is said to have made a deal with the Devil to gain an ecclesiastical position. His story is significant as it is one of the oldest popular stories of a pact with the Devil and was an inspiration for the Faust legend. Eutychianus of Adana, who claimed to be an eyewitness of the events, is the first to record Theophilus's story.

Although Theophilus is considered to be a historical personage, the tale associated with him is of an apocryphal nature. He is venerated as a saint in the Eastern Orthodox Church and Roman Catholic Church, with a feast day on 23 June and 4 February respectively.

== Legend ==
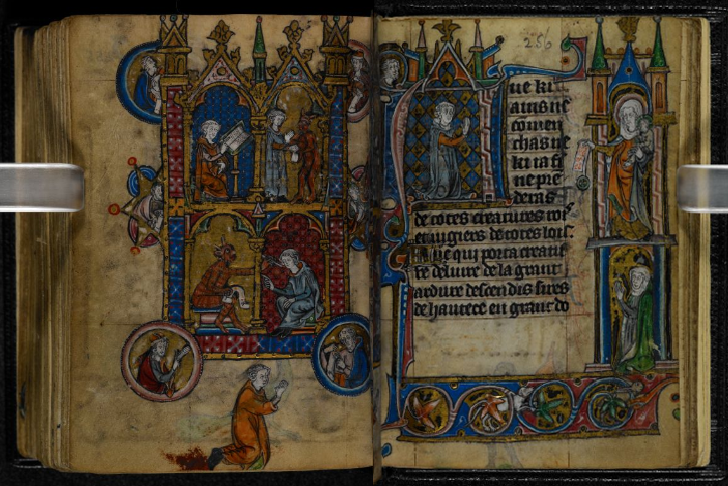
Theophilus making a pact with the devil. Miniature in the Maastricht Hours, ca. 1300-25

Theophilus was the archdeacon of Adana, Cilicia, then a part of the Byzantine Empire. He was unanimously elected to be a bishop, and when out of humility he turned the position down, another man was elected in his stead. When the new bishop, based on malicious and unfounded rumors, unjustly deprived Theophilus of his position as archdeacon, Theophilus regretted his previous stance and sought out a necromancer, who helped him contact Satan. In exchange for his aid, Satan demanded that Theophilus renounce Christ and the Virgin Mary in a contract signed with his own blood. Theophilus complied, and the devil gave him the position as bishop.

Later, fearful for his soul, Theophilus repented and prayed to the Virgin Mary for forgiveness. After forty days of fasting, the Virgin appeared to him and verbally chastised him. Theophilus begged her for forgiveness and she promised to intercede with God on his behalf. He then fasted a further thirty days, after which the Virgin Mary appeared to him again, and granted him absolution. However, Satan was unwilling to relinquish his hold over Theophilus, and three days later, Theophilus awoke to find the damning contract on his chest. He then took the contract to the legitimate bishop and confessed all that he had done. The bishop burned the document, and Theophilus died out of sheer joy to be free from the burden of his contract.

== Importance ==
Theophilus's story played a role in establishing the importance of the intercession of the Virgin Mary, in addition to providing a basis for later tales involving the conjuration of devils. In the late 10th century, the German canoness Hrotsvitha included the story of Theophilus in her Book of Legends, and Ælfric of Eynsham used the legend as an example of the Virgin's intercession in his homily on her Assumption.

The Virgin Mary increased in her theological importance throughout the 11th century. The story was used to illustrate the power and necessity of her intercession by Peter Damian, Bernard of Clairvaux, Anthony of Padua, Bonaventure and much later on by Alphonsus Liguori. The story of Theophilus formed the basis of a thirteenth-century miracle play by the trouvère Rutebeuf, Le Miracle de Théophile, one of the earliest pieces of French theatre extant. Over time, the tale acquired a number of variations. In some, Theophilus was motivated by jealousy. In another, the pact was sealed with a ring.

== The legend in art ==
The legend of Theophilus first appears in art in the 11th century in an historiated initial, which depicts the Virgin (who is seated between two angels) with Theophilus at her feet. The earliest intact narrative cycle is at the abbey church of Sainte-Marie at Souillac, France. This sculpture depicts four scenes of the legend: the signing of the bond, the oath of loyalty to the devil, Theophilus's repentance, and the return of the bond by the Virgin.

The legend was the most popular in art in the 13th century; it occurred most frequently in illuminated manuscripts and stained glass. In both illuminated manuscripts and stained glass that depict this legend there are usually four scenes that are shown: the sealing of the bond between Theophilus and the devil, Theophilus repenting, the Virgin recovering the bond, and the Virgin returning the bond to Theophilus. This legend is the only non-biblical Marian story consistently depicted in sculpture and glass in French cathedrals during this time.

Marcel Proust briefly mentions him in Swann's Way as being an important figure of sculpture in France.

== Sources ==
- John Yohalem (March, 2005), "Crossing the Line of Forbidden Knowledge" Retrieved 11 April 2005
- Paul Carus (1900) "The History of the Devil " pp. 415–417 Retrieved 11 April 2005
- Alphonsus Liguori, (1750)"Mary's Intercession Is Necessary for our Salvation " Retrieved 11 April 2005
