= Rutebeuf =

13th century French poet

Rutebeuf (or Rustebeuf; fl. 1245 – c. 1285) was a French trouvère (poet-composers who worked in France's northern dialects).

== Early life ==
He was born in the first half of the 13th century, possibly in Champagne (he describes conflicts in Troyes in 1249); he was evidently of humble birth, and was a Parisian by education and residence.

== Career ==
His name is not mentioned by his contemporaries. He frequently plays in his verse on the word Rutebeuf, which was a pen name, and is variously explained by him as derived from rude boeuf and rude oeuvre ("coarse ox" or "rustic piece of work").

Paulin Paris thought that he began life in the lowest rank of the minstrel profession as a jongleur (juggler and musician). Some of his poems have autobiographical value. In Le Mariage de Rutebeuf ("The Marriage of Rutebeuf") he writes that on 2 January 1261 he married a woman old and ugly, with neither dowry nor amiability. In the Complainte de Rutebeuf he details a series of misfortunes that had reduced him to abject destitution. In these circumstances he seeks relief from Count Alphonse of Poitiers.

=== Under stress ===
Other poems in the same vein reveal that his miserable circumstances were chiefly due to a love of play, particularly a game played with dice; which was known as griesche. It would seem that his distress could not be due to lack of patrons; for his metrical Life of Saint Elizabeth of Hungary was written by request of Erard de Valery, who wished to present it to Queen Isabel of Navarre; and he wrote elegies on the deaths of Anceau de l'Isle Adam, the third of the name, who died about 1251, Count Odo of Nevers (died 1266), King Theobald II of Navarre (died 1270), and Count Alphonse of Poitiers (d. 1271), which were probably paid for by their families. In the Pauvreté de Rutebeuf ("The Poverty of Rutebeuf"), he directly addresses Louis IX.

The piece that is most obviously intended for popular recitation is the Dû de L'Herberie ("Debt of the Herb Garden"), a dramatic monologue in prose and verse supposed to be delivered by a quack doctor. Rutebeuf was also a master in the verse conte (narrative verse), and the five of his fabliaux (fables) that have come down to us are light and amusing. The matter, it may be added, is coarse. The adventures of Frere Denyse le cordelier (Brother Dennis of the Order of the Cordeliers—Franciscans, who wore a rope belt, were nicknamed Cordeliers in France), and of "la dame qui alla trois fois autour du moutier" ("the lady who went around the monastery three times") find a place in the Cent Nouvelles nouvelles ("One Hundred Short Stories").

=== Satirist ===
Rutebeuf's best work is his satires and verse contes. Rutebeuf's work as a satirist probably dates from about 1260. His chief topics are the iniquities of the friars, and the defence of the secular clergy of the University of Paris against their encroachments. He delivered a series of eloquent and insistent poems (1262, 1263, 1268, 1274) exhorting princes and people to take part in the Crusades. He was a champion of the University of Paris in its quarrel with the religious orders who were supported by Pope Alexander IV. He defended William of Saint-Amour when he was driven into exile.

The libels, indecent songs and rhymes condemned by the Pope to be burnt together with the Perils des derniers temps attributed to Saint-Amour, were probably the work of Rutebeuf. The satire of Renart le Bestourné, which borrows from the Reynard cycle little but the names under which the characters are disguised, was directed, according to Paulin Paris, against Philip the Bold. His religious poems, and also the Voie de Paradis ("The Way to Heaven"), the description of a dream, in the manner of the Roman de la Rose came in his later years.

=== Le Miracle de Théophile ===
A miracle play of his, Le Miracle de Théophile, is one of the earliest dramatic pieces extant in French. The subject of Theophilus of Adana was a familiar one to the storytellers of the Middle Ages. It described the Cilician monk who made a pact with the devil and was saved by the intervention of the Virgin. This subject had been treated dramatically in the Latin piece ascribed to the nun Hroswitha of Gandersheim, but his piece has importance in dramatic history.

== Collections ==
The Oeuvres of Rutebeuf were edited by Achille Jubinal in 1839. A more critical 1885 edition is by Adolf Kressne. He was reviewed Paulin Paris and by M. Leon Cledat.

== In popular culture ==
In 1955 the poet and composer Léo Ferré adapted lines from "La Complainte de Rutebeuf" in writing the song "Pauvre Rutebeuf" (Poor Rutebeuf), which has been covered by many artists including Catherine Sauvage, Joan Baez, and Nana Mouskouri.

Asteroid 283786 Rutebeuf, discovered by astronomers at the French Saint-Sulpice Observatory in 2003, was named in memory of the poet. The official naming citation was published by the Minor Planet Center on 14 February 2014 (M.P.C. 87143).
