= Russian Partition =

Former territories of the Polish–Lithuanian Commonwealth acquired by the Russian Empire

The Russian Partition
- Until 1815
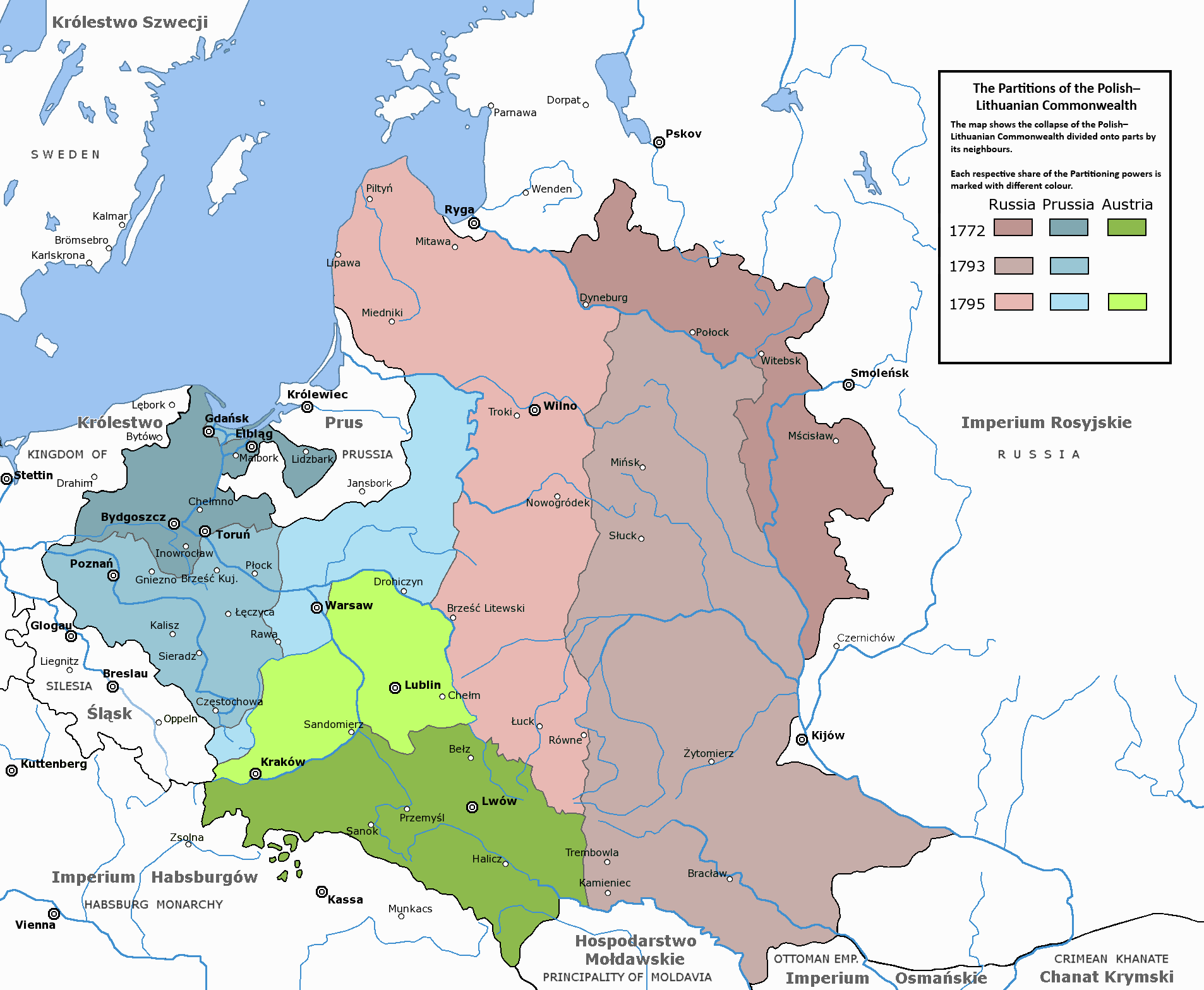
- The three partitions of the Polish–Lithuanian Commonwealth. The Russian Partition (red), the Austrian Partition (green), and the Prussian Partition (blue)
- After 1815
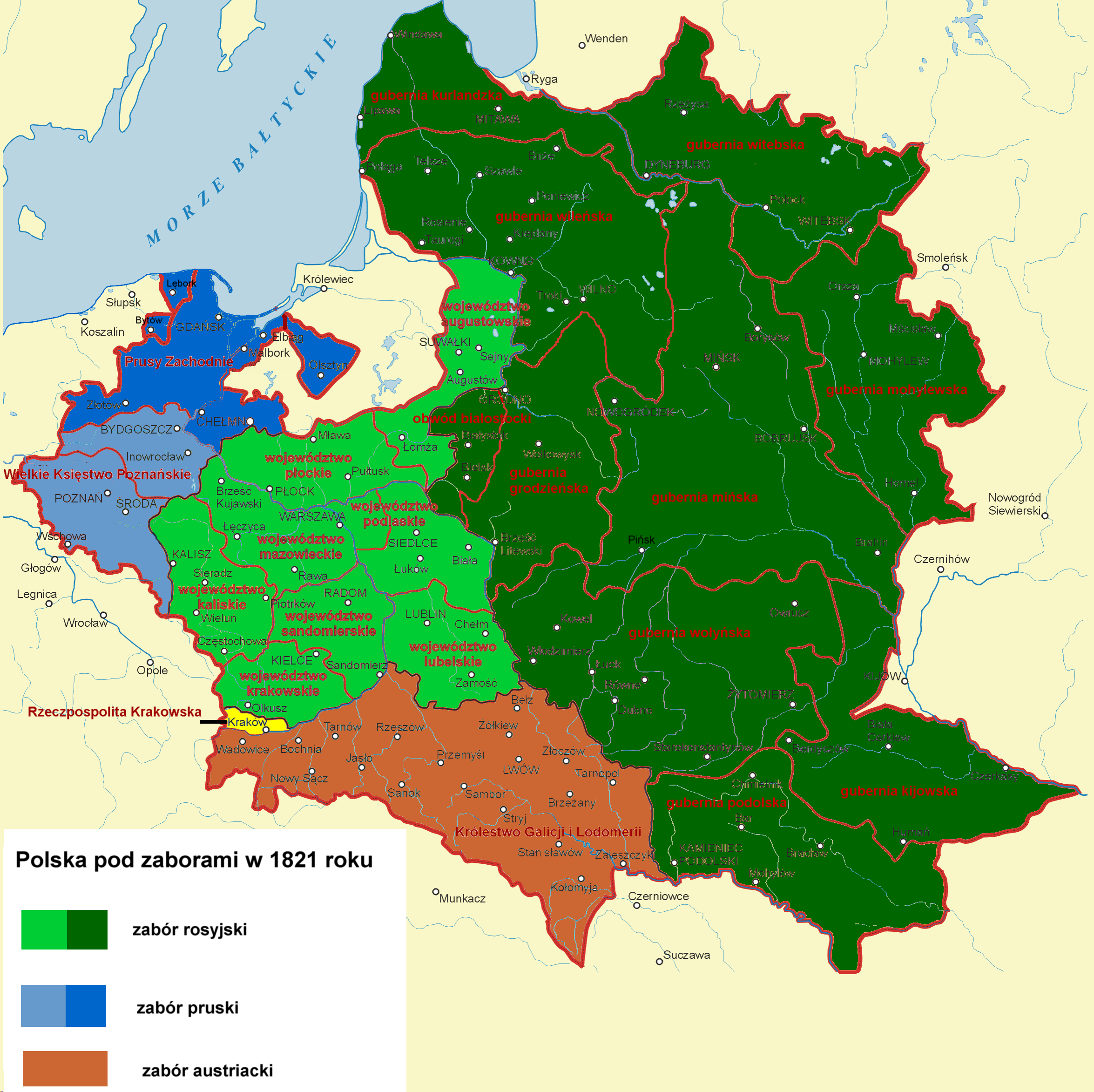
- The partitioned Poland after the Congress of Vienna. Territories that were already Russian are marked in dark green, territories that became Russian after 1815 are marked in light green.

The Russian Partition (Polish: zabór rosyjski) constituted the former territories of the Polish–Lithuanian Commonwealth that were annexed by the Russian Empire in the course of late-18th-century Partitions of Poland. The Russian acquisition encompassed the largest share of the Polish–Lithuanian Commonwealth's population, living on 463,200 km^{2} (178,800 sq mi) of land constituting the eastern and central territory of the former Commonwealth. The three partitions, which took place in 1772, 1793 and 1795, resulted in the complete loss of Poland's and Lithuania's sovereignty, with their territories split between Russia, Prussia and Austria. The majority of Lithuania's former territory was annexed by the Russian Empire, except for Užnemunė (a geographical area on the left bank of the River Neman) which was annexed by Prussia.

The Napoleonic Wars saw significant parts of Prussia's and Austria's partitions reconstituted as the Duchy of Warsaw (a French client state in a personal union under Saxony), most of which was then reconstituted as the Kingdom of Poland within the Russian Empire in 1815.

== Terminology ==
To both Russians and Poles, the term Russian Poland was not acceptable. To the Russians after partition, Poland ceased to exist, and their newly acquired territories were considered the long lost parts of Mother Russia. To Poles, Poland was simply Polish, never Russian. While the Russians used varying administrative names for their new territories (see below), another popular term, used in Poland and adopted by most other historiographies, was the Russian Partition.

== History ==
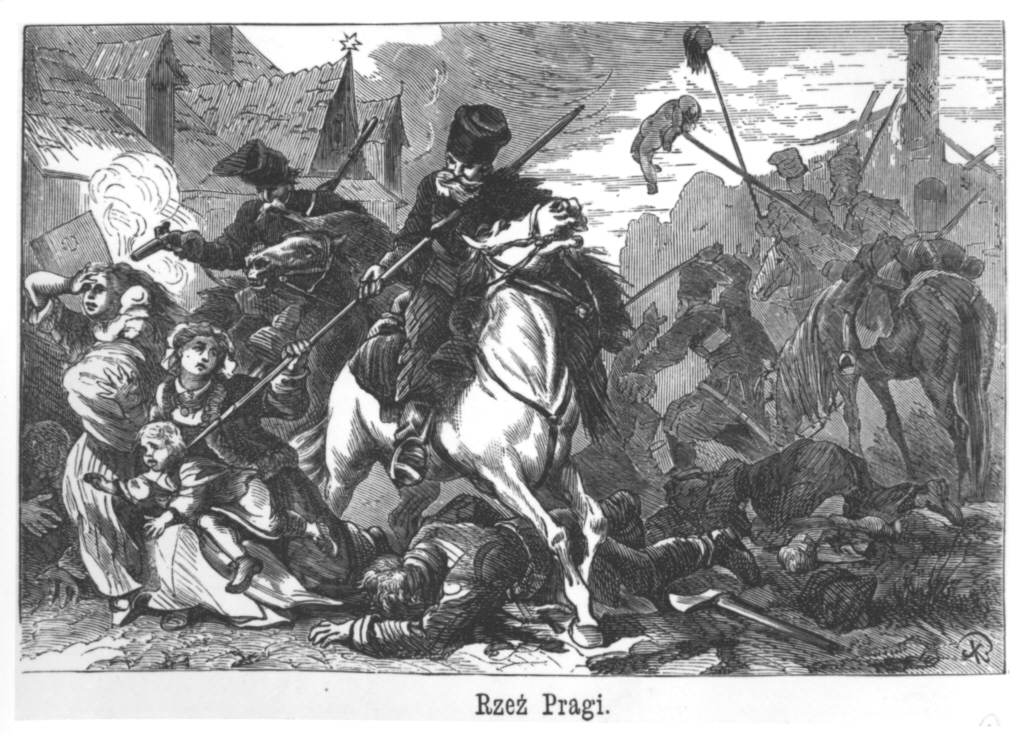
The Massacre of Praga (now a district of Warsaw), April 1794

Even before the partitions from the late 18th century, the Russian Empire had already acquired some territories of the Polish–Lithuanian Commonwealth (a real union of Kingdom of Poland with the Grand Duchy of Lithuania). The first Russian partition took place in the late 17th century when the forced Treaty of Andrusovo signed in 1667 granted Russia the Commonwealth's territory in the Eastern Ukraine. Under the Third Partition of Poland Russia acquired Courland, all Lithuanian territory east of the Nieman River, and the remaining parts of Volhynian Ukraine.

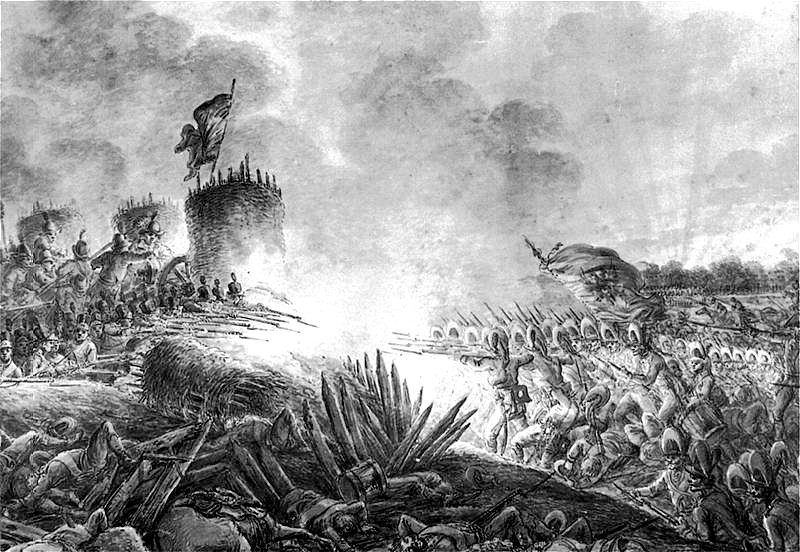
The Battle of Praga, prior to the Russian massacre of civilians

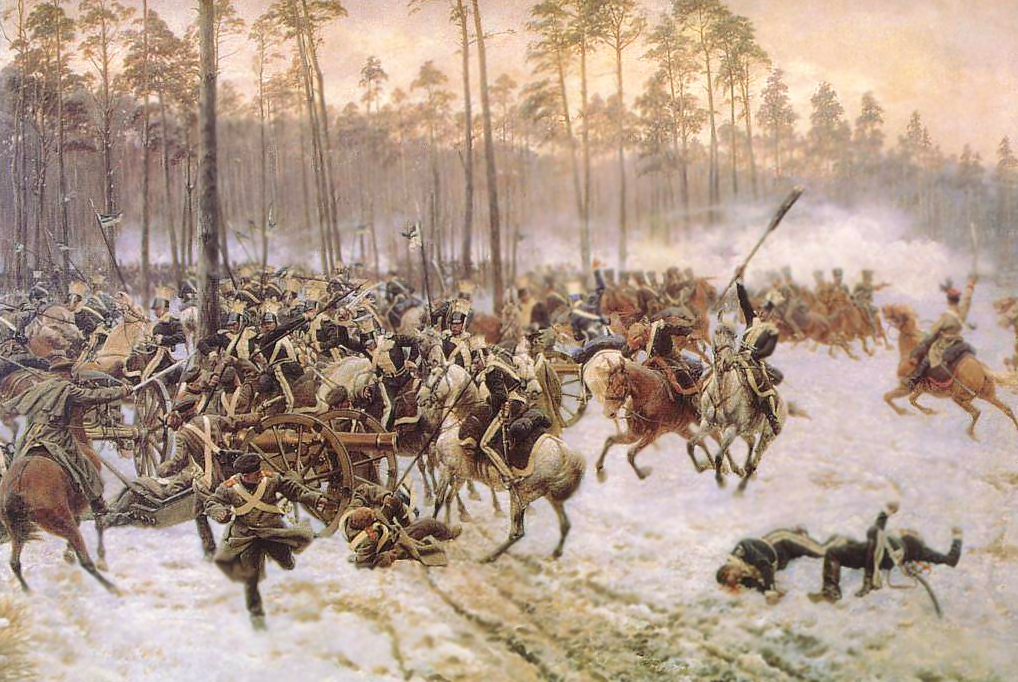
Battle of Stoczek in 1831, part of November Uprising against the Russian imperial rule

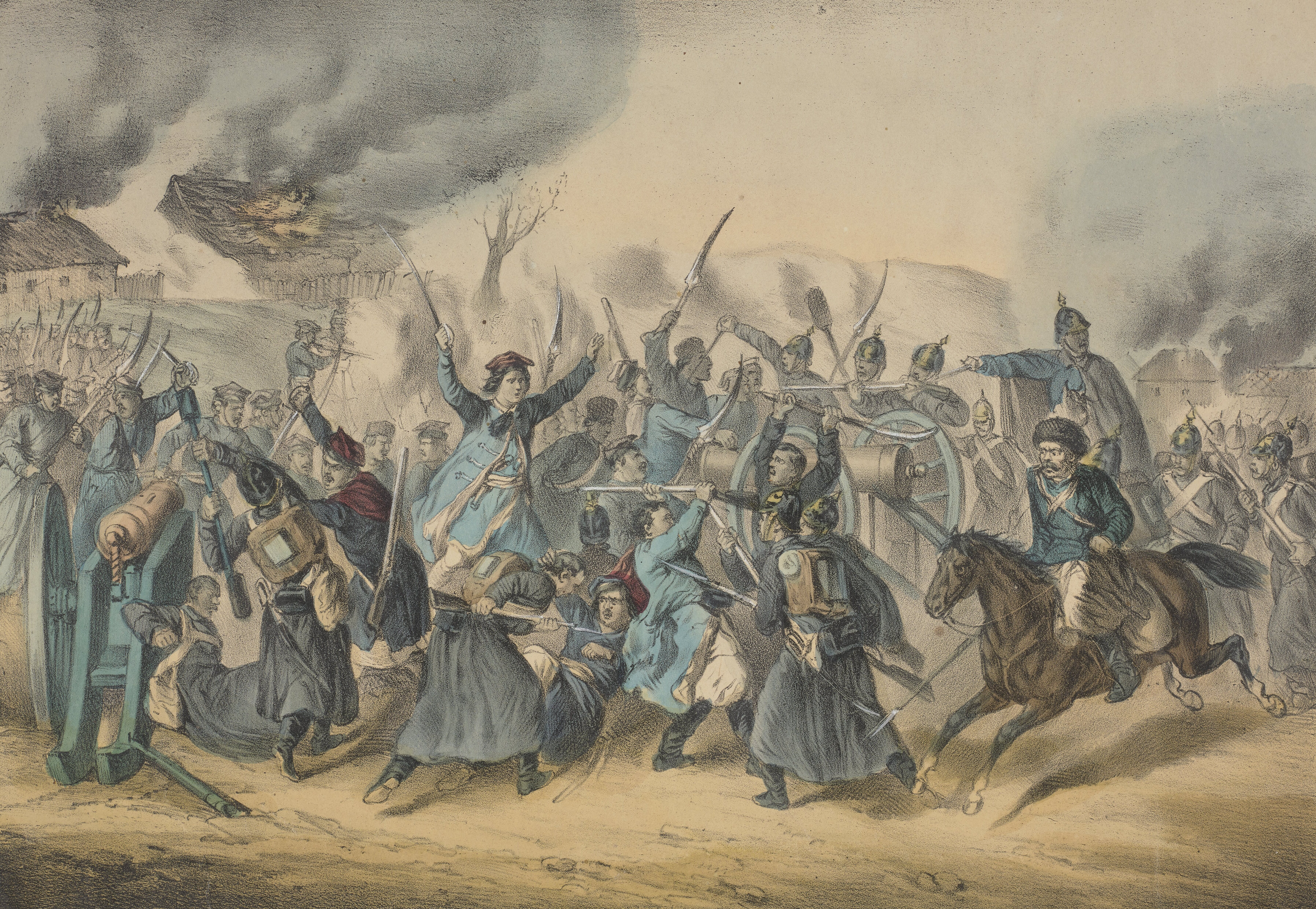
Battle of Węgrów (1863), one of over 60 battles during the January Uprising

Major historical events of the Russian Partition included the Warsaw Uprising (1794) soon after Kościuszko's victory at Racławice. It ended up in the massacre of Praga district of Warsaw, in which the Russian imperial army killed up to 20,000 civilians in reprisal or revenge, regardless of gender and age. "The whole of Praga was strewn with dead bodies, blood was flowing in streams" wrote Suvorov himself.

In 1807, the victorious Napoleon formed the Duchy of Warsaw after his War of the Fourth Coalition against Prussia and Russia. The new Duchy was held in personal union by King Frederick Augustus I of Saxony. However, the Duchy was dissolved after just a few years following the 1815 Congress of Vienna, and all its territory returned to its previous rulers. The Tsarist Kingdom of Poland was established in the territory returned to Russia with the Tsar taking the title of King of Poland. The protectorate was gradually integrated into Russia over the course of the 19th century. Notwithstanding, the relentless Russian exploitation activities led to the 1830–1831 November Uprising which took place in the heartland of partitioned Poland, forming a government. Its subsequent defeat resulted in a new wave of Tsarist mass repressions and punitive actions. In 1863–1864 another insurrection, the January Uprising, broke out. This time, the Carmelite friars who helped the insurgents were sent on death marches to Siberia chained by their necks together. The January Uprising lead to the Kingdom's autonomy being drastically reduced, and its renaming as Vistula Land. There is debate as to whether the Kingdom of Poland, as a state, was formally replaced by the Vistula Land. Towns were stripped of their charters in reprisal and turned into villages. The Russian Partition of Poland was made an official province of the Russian Empire in 1867.

In the early 20th century, a major part of the Russian Revolution of 1905 was the Revolution in the Kingdom of Poland (1905–1907). The return to Poland's independence was a result of the First World War on the Polish lands (1914–1918), the overthrow of the Tsarist regime, and the defeat of the Central Powers in 1918.

== Society ==
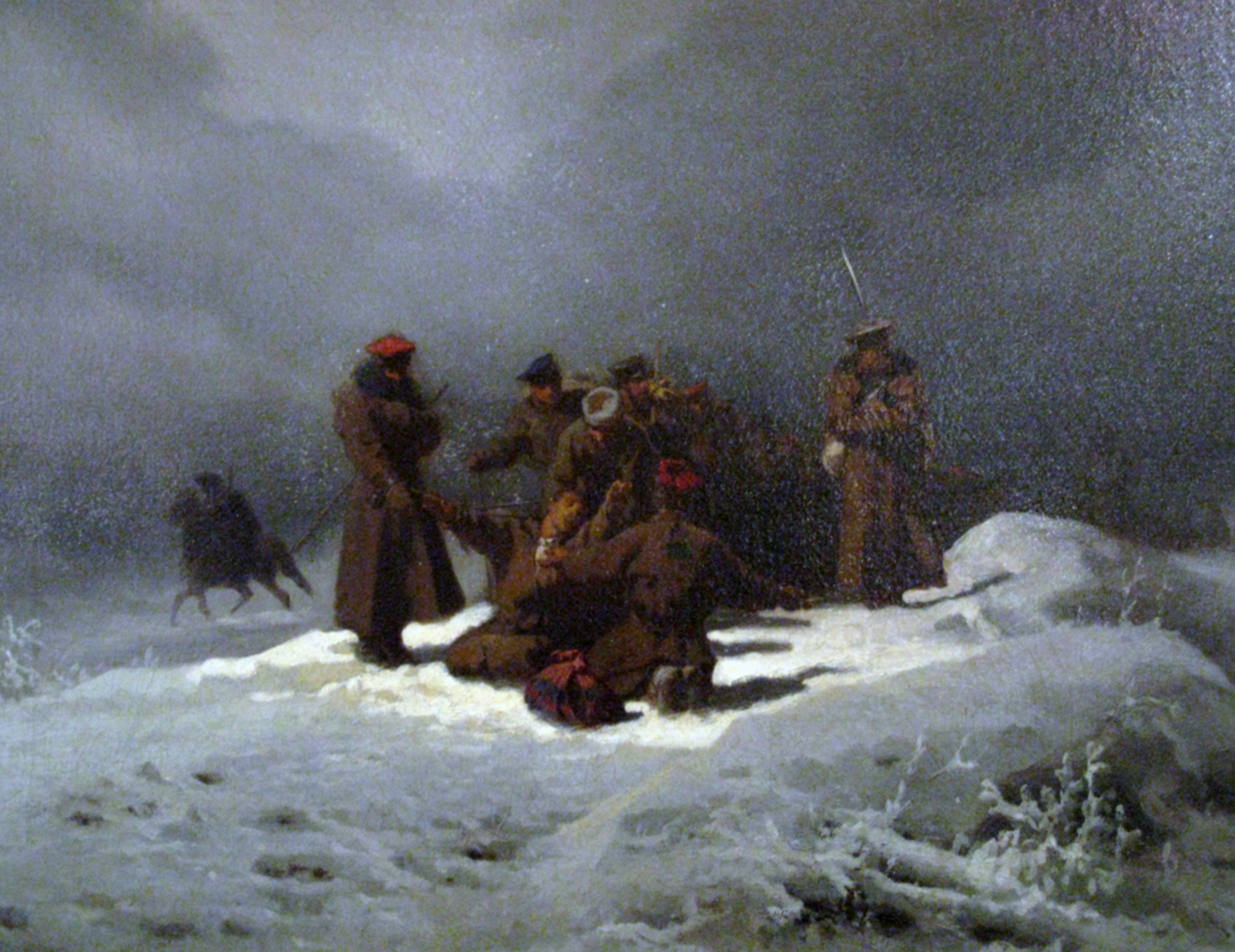
1865 Death march of Polish captives to Siberia by Grottger

The Russification policies were harsh, and there were many repressions, particularly in the aftermath of the November Uprising (1830–1831) and later, the January Uprising of 1863–1864. Many Poles were exiled to Siberia, some 80,000 of them in 1864 in the single largest deportation action commenced by the empire. Polish language was discriminated against, and it lost its official status. "Books were burned; churches destroyed; priests murdered;" wrote Norman Davies. There was no education in the Polish language, and publications in Polish were few. The only elementary schools were constantly underfinanced. The city of Warsaw under the Tsarist rule resembled a military base with exclusively Russian stores and clubs as well as 12 Russian garrisons in the city, equipped with newly built horse stables, and amenities like laundry shacks, and cabbage pickleries.

Polish stores – where Russian was not being spoken – were routinely denied a license. Polish names were removed even from botanical signs. Hunger and poverty were rampant with record number of women forced to work at the Russian military brothels, of which there were some 185 in total, including 16 official ones (1884). In cheap army brothels, sex could be bought for as little as 30 kopecks (less than 1/3 of a rouble); one woman for every 30 Russians stationed at a garrison, with beatings and instances of women getting killed by them in drunken rages. Sex slaves were obliged to drink with the clients as a general rule. Officers had their own brothels under the chief of police (1888–1895), known sex connoisseur Nikolai Kleigels (Russian: Николай Клейгельс) who was selling young Polish girls dressed in exotic costumes for 10 roubles a visit. The girls were categorized by the Russian authorities as either inexpensive, medium-priced, or exclusive based on age, beauty and demeanour. In all cities with the Russian garrisons, army-licensed brothels were required to provide so-called "patriotic duty" to their regiments by giving one free visit per soldier, at least once a week. The battalions of 186 men each, divided into 9 companies, were taken to brothels under the command of an infantry sergeant. Each girl was required to service 20-21 members of a battalion, after which she would be allowed to take other men to make money in order to buy food. Jewish girls were especially vulnerable due to the totality of the tsarist official antisemitism including mass expulsions of Litvaks commanded by Alexander III of Russia which led to desperation and hunger.

There was nonetheless growth in the national consciousness, and the Revolution in the Kingdom of Poland (1905–1907) resulted in the general improvement of the situation soon before the dissolution of the Empire. Some major political parties of the Second Polish Republic developed around that time in the Russian partition (ex. Polish Socialist Party). The New York Times noted some aspects of society that were still "risky" or "distressing" in 1907. Police units sometimes feared being stabbed or shot, while civilians sometimes feared being imprisoned while merely asking a policeman for directions. In 1909, a gendarme chief was severely wounded in an ambush in Warsaw. In 1910, a bomb exploded at the Grodzisk station, killing or wounding several gendarmes.

Ukrainians were officially considered "part of the Russian people" and at the time mostly referred to as Little Russians. Since they were seen as Russians they were not discriminated against at the individual level and (if they could speak Russian) any career was open to them. Nonetheless, in 1804 Ukrainian as a subject and language of instruction was banned from schools. A following 1863 ban on Ukrainian books led to Alexander II's secret Ems Ukaz, which prohibited publication and importation of most Ukrainian-language books, public performances and lectures, and even banned the printing of Ukrainian texts accompanying musical scores. Ukrainians living in Austria-Hungary were given more rights than Ukrainians living in the Russian Empire.

== Economy ==
The territories of the Russian Partition saw very moderate economic growth over time. No business activity could take place without bribing the Tsarist officials first. Much of the output of the Polish Partition was exported to Russia proper, especially after the border between Congress Poland and Russia was abolished in 1851. The emancipation reform of 1861 was a major step towards industrialization and urbanization. Particularly, the last three or four decades before World War I saw significant economic development and urbanization. However, in many areas of the economy, development stalled.

== Administrative division ==
The Russian Empire divided the former territories of the Commonwealth it obtained (Rech Pospolitaya in Russian) by creating or enlarging the following guberniyas (Tsarist governorates, or provinces).

- Belarus Governorate (Belorussian Gubernya, 1802) divided into Vitebsk and Mogilev Gubernya
- Bratslav Governorate (or Bratslav uyezd, see Podolia Governorate)
- Chernigov Governorate
- Izyaslav Governorate
- Yekaterinoslav Governorate/Novorossiya Governorate (1764)
- Kiev Governorate (1708)
- Lithuania Governorate (1795), later split into Lithuania-Grodno Governorate and Lithuania-Vilna Governorate, the last one later split into Vilna and Kovno Governorates
- Minsk Governorate (1793)
- Mogilev Governorate (1772)
- Podolia Governorate (1773)
- Polotsk Governorate
- Pskov Governorate
- Slonim Governorate (1795) (several months after creation connected to Lithuania Governorate in and split off from it in 1801 as Lithuania-Grodno Governorate)
- Volhynia Governorate (1793)

After the Congress of Vienna in 1815, the Russian Empire created a separate entity called Congress Poland out of some of the above governorates. See administrative division of Congress Poland for details. Territories in the Russian partition which were not incorporated into Congress Poland were officially known as the Western Krai, and in Poland as the taken lands (Polish: ziemie zabrane).

The Western Krai comprised the following lands of the Commonwealth:

- From the first partition of Poland (1772): Polish Inflants (Latgale), the northern part of the Polotsk Voivodeship, the entire Mstsislaw Voivodeship and Vitebsk Voivodeships, and the southeastern part of the Minsk Voivodeship (about 92,000 km^{2})
- From the second partition of Poland (1793): the remaining part of the Minsk Voivodeship, the entire Kiev Voivodeship, Bracław Voivodeship and Vilnius Voivodeships, parts of Podole Voivodeship and eastern parts of the Wołyń Voivodeship and Brest Litovsk Voivodeships (about 250,000 km^{2})
- From the third partition of Poland (1795): all the territories east of the Bug River(about 120,000. km^{2}) and after 1807 the Belostok Oblast)

It consisted of 9 guberniyas: six Belarusian and Lithuanian ones that constituted the Northwestern Krai (Vilna Governorate, Kovno Governorate, Grodno Governorate, Minsk Governorate, Mogilev Governorate and Vitebsk Governorate) and three Ukrainian ones that constituted the Southwestern Krai (Volhynia Governorate, Podolia Governorate and Kiev Governorate).

In the first partition, Russia gained 92,000 km^{2} and 1.3 million people. In the second, 250,000 km^{2} and 1 million people. In the third, 120,000 km^{2} and 1.2 million people. Overall, Russia had gained about 62 percent of the former Commonwealth territory (462,000 km^{2}) and about 45 percent of the population (3.5 million people). The Russian partition was thus the largest and most populous of the three partitions (the other two being the Austrian Partition and the Prussian Partition).

For changes in the administrative division of the Russian partition in the 19th century, see administrative division of Congress Poland.

During World War I (1914–1918), many of the territories were occupied by the Central Powers (primarily, German Empire) and came to be administered by the Ober Ost.

== See also ==
- History of Poland (1795–1918)
