= Bartholomites =

The Bartholomites were the Roman Catholic congregation of Armenian monks who sought refuge in Italy after the invasion of their country in 1296 by Al-Adil Kitbugha, the Sultan of Egypt.

== History ==
The first of their number landed at Genoa, where a church of St. Bartholomew was built for them, hence their name Bartholomites. Others soon followed this first band and were established in various Italian cities: Parma, Siena, Pisa, Florence, Civitavecchia, Rome and Ancona. To these early foundations were afterwards added others at Milan, Naples, Perugia, Gubbio, Ferrar, Bologna, Padua, Rimini, Veterbo, etc.; in fact the Bartholomites were both numerous and prosperous.

In the beginning they observed the Rule of St. Basil and the Armenian Liturgy, Pope Clement V acknowledging their right thereto, but in time they abandoned their national traditions for the Roman Liturgy, adopted a habit resembling that of the Dominicans and finally replaced the Rule of St. Basil by that of St. Augustine.

Innocent VI, who approved this change (1356), also confirmed the union of their monasteries into one congregation governed by a superior-general and a general chapter. The superiors-general were at first elected for life, but in 1474 Pope Sixtus IV caused them to be voted for every three years.

Pope Boniface IX granted the congregation the privileges of the Order of St. Dominic and Innocent VIII and Paul III ratified the same; nevertheless the Bartholomites were prohibited from joining any other religious order except that of the Carthusians. Durazzo, their first cardinal protector, was appointed by Urban VIII in 1640, but they did not long enjoy this signal advantage. Their regular observance began to decline, their ranks were but meagrely recruited and most of their houses had to be closed till at length only four or five were left, in which about forty monks lived as best they could. There seemed to be no way of averting this decadence.

Innocent X authorized the Bartholomites to enter other religious orders or else to secularize themselves, assuring each of them a pension. He suppressed their congregation and its houses and revenues were put to new uses.

Until recently in their church at Genoa there was preserved the celebrated portrait of Christ known as the Image of Edessa.

== Notable Bartholomites ==
Among the most noted Bartholomites were:

- Father Martin, who conducted the first Armenian monks to Genoa and was their superior
- Father Anthony of Pisa, who was the first superior-general of their congregation
- Esteban Palma, who four times held the office of general and worked for the reform of the congregation
- Cherubini Cerbelloni of Genoa, a preacher
- Paul Costa of Milan, a preacher
- Scoti, an author
- Pori, an author
- Girolamo Cavalieri, an author
- J. B. Ladriani, an author
- Gregorio Bitio, an author
