= Mephistopheles in the arts and popular culture =

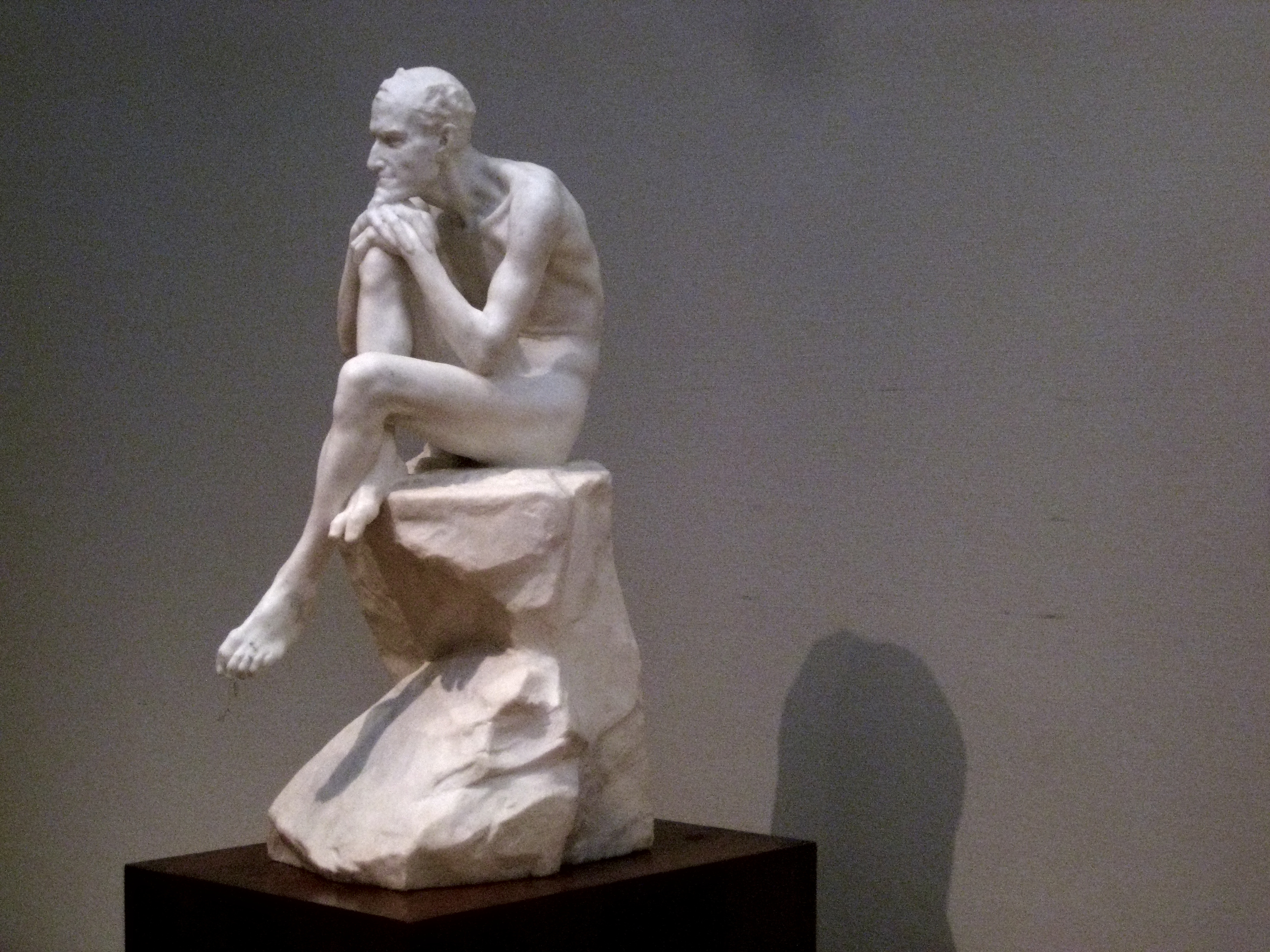
Mephistopheles by Mark Antokolsky, 1884

This article lists cultural references to Mephistopheles, the fictional devil from Faust and Doctor Faustus who has been used in other pieces of literature, film, comics and music.

== Art ==
- The 19th century wood statue Mephistopheles and Margaretta is based on the Goethe's play Faust.
- Mephistopheles by Mark Antokolsky (pictured right), 1884, is a marble statue by the Russian sculptor.
- Mephistopheles by Paul Mathey, 1888, is a portrait of the character.

== Drama ==
- 1594 – Christopher Marlowe's The Tragical History of Doctor Faustus
- 1808 – Johann Wolfgang von Goethe's Faust, Part One
- 1832 – Johann Wolfgang von Goethe's Faust, Part Two
- 1996 - Richard O’Brien starred as the swanky Mephistopheles Smith in his musical comedy Disgracefully Yours.

== Opera ==
- 1816 – Ludwig Spohr's Faust (based on plays and poems by Klinger and von Kleist, derived from the Faust folk tales)
- 1846 – Hector Berlioz's "Légende dramatique" La Damnation de Faust (based on Goethe's Faust, Part One, but includes a tragic ending without redemption for Faust, following the Faust folk tales)
- 1859 – Charles Gounod's Faust (loosely based on Goethe's Faust, Part One)
- 1868 – Arrigo Boito's opera Mefistofele (the most faithful adaptation of Goethe's Faust, Part One; it is the only operatic adaptation to date to include Faust, Part Two as well)

== Music ==
- Mephiskapheles is a New York City-based ska band founded in 1990 with a playfully Satanic theme after the fashion of heavy metal music. The band helped define, then transcended, the ska punk genre. Mephiskapheles' music has diverse stylistic influences, including reggae, jazz and hardcore punk, and the band has made several national and international tours since 1995.
- Mephistopheles is mentioned in the song "If You Want A Receipt For That Popular Mystery" sung by Colonel Calverley in the Gilbert and Sullivan operetta Patience, in the lyric "Force of Mephisto pronouncing a ban".
- Marilyn Manson has a song entitled "The Mephistopheles of Los Angeles", from the 2015 album The Pale Emperor.
- The Police song "Wrapped Around Your Finger", from the album Synchronicity, mentions Mephistopheles in the third verse.
- The Radiohead song "Videotape" from In Rainbows mentions Mephistopheles.
- A lyric in the OneRepublic song "Love Runs Out" mentions "Got an angel on my shoulder, and Mephistopheles." However, Ryan Tedder may be referring to Mr. Mistoffelees, from T.S. Eliot's poetry.
- Mephistopheles is the main character in the song "The Devil's Song" by Marcy Playground .
  - Additionally, Mephistopheles is mentioned in the Marcy Playground song "Deadly Handsome Man".
- The band Streetlight Manifesto mentions Mephistopheles in the song "Down, Down, Down to Mephisto's Café", which talks about going to Mephistopheles cafe in reference to going to hell.
- The Strung Out album The Element of Sonic Defiance has a song named "Mephisto".
- Kamelot has written the albums Epica and The Black Halo, telling the tale of a deal that Mephistopheles offers to God. If Mephistopheles can claim the soul of God's favorite man, an alchemist and scholar named Ariel, then he can return to Heaven; if not, then Mephistopheles will be condemned to Hell forever. The second album in the story has a song titled "March of Mephisto".
- The Trans-Siberian Orchestra album Beethoven's Last Night (2000), telling the tale of a deal Mephistopheles offers him: in exchange for his musical works, Beethoven will regain his soul, which was never taken from him in the first place. The album incorrectly presumed Mephistopheles and the devil are one and the same.
- Mephistopheles is a popular brass band 'contest' march composed by Shipley Douglas (1868-1920) of technical complexity, dynamic and rhythmic detail, and melodic variety out of the rigid conventions and structural formulae of the military march. It poses a stiff challenge for any band having more in common with a light opera overture than a traditional road march, and as such is a favourite march chosen by many of the top bands.
- On his 2010 album Heartland, Owen Pallett included an original track entitled "Tryst with Mephistopheles".
- U2 singer Bono created the alter ego Mr MacPhisto for the band's Zoo TV Tour in 1993.
- "The Sins of Memphisto" is a track on John Prine's 1991 album The Missing Years. Memphisto is a blend word of Memphis and Mephisto.
- "Mephistopheles" is the title of the eighth track from the self-titled album by the American death metal band Deicide.
- Mephistopheles is mentioned in the Fugees song "Zealots" in the first verse recited by Wyclef Jean: "I haunt MCs like Mephistopheles" off of their second album The Score (1996).
- Mephistopheles is mentioned in the song "bedroom community" by Glass Beach with the line "To the arms of Mephistopheles."
- Mephistopheles is mentioned in the song “Call Me Little Sunshine” by the Swedish band Ghost from their fifth album Impera (2022). “Call me, call me Mephistopheles”.
- Mephistopheles is represented in the four Mephisto Waltzes by the composer Franz Liszt.
- "Mephisto" is the title of the fourth track on Klaus Schulze's 2005 electronic album "Moonlake". It is taken from a 2003 live performance in Poznan in Poland.
- "Mephistofeles" is the name of an Argentinian proto-doom band.
- "Mephisto" (メフィスト, Mefisuto) is a song released by the Japanese rock band Queen Bee, used as the ending theme for the anime Oshi no Ko. The single also included the track "Faust" (ファウスト, Fausuto), which describes the deal he made with Mephistopheles.
- Mephistopheles is mentioned in the English progressive rock band Cardiacs song, "Fast Robert", which was first released as the seventh/eighth track (seventh track on LP, eighth track on CD) of their second studio album; On Land and in the Sea (1989). The third verse starts with the lyric, "Poison in my idle mind makes quick work for the Mephistopheles".
- Faust symphony is a three movement symphony by Franz Liszt featuring one act for Faust, one for Gretchen, and the last for Mephistopheles.
- "Mephisto Waltz" is the sixth track on the album Nocturnal Opera released by the Japanese visual kei gothic metal band Moi dix Mois in 2004.
- "Mephisto" is a song released by the Portuguese gothic metal band Moonspell on their second album Irreligious in 1997.

== Films ==
- One of the antagonists in the 1945 Republic serial film Manhunt of Mystery Island is a resurrected pirate named Captain Mephisto.
- In the 1946 film Angel on My Shoulder, Claude Rains portrays Mephistopheles, who is nicknamed Nick.
- In Akira Kurosawa's 1952 film Ikiru, the character Sakai, portrayed by Haruo Tanaka, likens himself to Mephistopheles, as he guides the main character through a night of debauchery as he grapples with a cancer diagnosis and his impending death.
- In the 1981 film Mephisto, which won an Oscar in 1982 for Best Foreign Film, actor Klaus Maria Brandauer plays a German stage actor whose abiding ambition is to play Mephistopheles on the stage. However, in order to achieve it, he "sells his soul" to the Nazi regime and in effect becomes Faust in real life.
- M, based on the character by Tim Vigil and David Quinn from the comic Faust, appears in the 2000 film adaptation Faust: Love of the Damned by director Brian Yuzna, portrayed by Andrew Divoff.
- In the 1994 film Faust by director Jan Švankmajer, Mephisto is summoned to make Faust's contract with Lucifer.
- In the 2007 film Ghost Rider, Peter Fonda plays the demon Mephistopheles.
- In the 2018 film Vox Lux, Jude Law's character "the Manager" can be interpreted as Mephistopheles, guiding the main character Celeste after she makes a deal with Satan.

== Comics ==
- Mephisto is a character who acts as a surrogate version of the devil in the Marvel Universe. Among other feats, he is responsible for turning Johnny Blaze into the Ghost Rider, fathering Blackheart, and imprisoning the soul of Doctor Doom's mother, Cynthia von Doom, as well as erasing Peter Parker and Mary Jane Watson's marriage from history in the One More Day storyline.
- Mephistopheles Yōma, a character of the manga Saint Seiya: The Lost Canvas – The Myth of Hades.
- Mephistopheles is a main character in Soul Cartel, a manhwa loosely based on the Faust legend.
- Mephistopheles is part of the main cast in the web comic and animated web series, Welcome to Hell.
- Mephistopheles is a side character in the cast of the manga Welcome to Demon School! Iruma-kun.

== Literature ==
- In E. M. Forster's short story "Co-Ordination", Mephistopheles appears as a spiritual being opposed to the coordination of mankind.
- In Goethe's Faust, Mephistopheles is the personified principle of negation, betting with God that he would succeed to make Faust turn away from God.
- In the 1939 poetry collection Old Possum's Book of Practical Cats by British playwright T.S. Eliot, as well as the musical adaptation Cats by Andrew Lloyd Webber, Mr. Mistoffelees, a black cat with magical powers, is named after Mephistopheles. Mr. Mistoffelees is also a main character in the 2019 film adaptation of Cats.
- In The Shepherd's Crown by Terry Pratchett, Mephistopheles is the name of a highly intelligent goat befriended by one of the characters, who is able to count to 20 and use the privy.
- In the fictional works of Bengali author Narayan Gangopadhyay, a character named Tenida (Bengali টেনিদা) had the catchphrase "De la grande Mephistopheles! Yak yak!" (ডি লা গ্রান্ডি মেফিস্টোফিলিস! ইয়াক ইয়াক!)
- In Dina and Daniel Nayeri's Another Faust series, Mephistopheles takes the form of a beautiful governess named Nicola Vileroy, taking children from their families, offering them deals that involve supernatural gifts, and raising them to be highly influential members of society. It is implied that among her charges were Queen Elizabeth I and Harry S. Truman.
- In the Matthew Reilly novel The Four Legendary Kingdoms, a character named "Mephisto" is a human who has been completely tattooed red, with surgically implanted horns. The character and his ancestors are shown to be the cause of the "Mephistopheles" myth.
- In The Sparrow by Mary Doria Russell, Emilio Sandoz is said to take on the personality of Mephistopheles in order to protect himself from his past experiences.
- In Agatha Christie's novel Cards on the Table, a pivotal character named Shaitana, who is described as being 'theatrical', with a 'macabre' and 'oriental' taste, is called 'Mephistophelian' several times throughout the novel.
- In the Highschool DxD light novel series, Mephisto Pheles is an Extra Demon, being one of the ancient Devils who have lived since the time of the original Devil Kings; as a liberalist, Mephisto has an antagonistic relationship with the Original Devil Kings Lucifer, Beelzebub, Leviathan and Asmodeus. Thus, Mephisto spent most of his time in the Human World, where he became famous as the legendary contracted Devil of the master sorcerer Johann Georg Faust. After Faust's death, Mephisto became the chairman of Grauzerberer, a famous Magician Association founded by Faust.
- In Heart of Darkness by Joseph Conrad the unnamed Brickmaker at Central Station is described as a papier-mâché Mephistopheles.
- In A Modern Mephistopheles by Louisa May Alcott the title alludes to the character Jasper Helwyze, who devilishly tempts aspiring writer Felix Canaris with fame and fortune in exchange for his soul. The story was published anonymously in 1877.
- In We (novel) by Yevgeny Zamyatin the revolutionary group MEPHI is named after Mephisto/Mephistopheles, as is stated in record 28 by the character I-330.

== Anime ==
- In the animated version of Shaman King, Faust VIII refers to his spirit, Eliza, as Mephisto E during the Shaman Fight, which is playing upon the Faustian legend he is associated with.
- In the Japanese anime Digimon Tamers, Mephistomon is the name of an Ultimate Level Digimon.
- In the show Blue Exorcist, Mephisto Pheles or Mephisto is the zany headmaster of True Cross Academy. While this version is obsessed with otaku culture, he carries several German elements in his spells as well as a fondness for making bets. The anime ending even has a short flashback and several other allusions to the original tale of Faust.
- In the show Suite PreCure, Mephisto is the king of Minor Land and leader of Trio the Minor, having been responsible for brainwashing them. However, he is later revealed to have been Aphrodite's husband and Ako's father before being brainwashed himself by the true villain, Noise.
- in Puella Magi Madoka Magica, the character Kyubey is a direct reference to Mephistopheles, with Homura Akemi taking the role of Faust and Madoka Kaname that of Gretchen.

== Television ==
- Ultraman Nexus features three Dark Ultras as the servants of the show's main antagonist, Dark Zagi. The three Dark Ultras are based around the story of Faustus; Dark Faust, who is defeated by Nexus early on in the show's run, Dark Mephisto, who survives his first encounter with Nexus and goes on to become his arch-rival, and a stronger version of Mephisto named Mephisto Zwei. Mephisto Zwei eventually meets his end at the hands of Nexus and a reformed Mephisto, who manages to find the light and achieves peace before sacrificing himself to defeat his stronger counterpart.
- Mephistopheles appears in Hex, portrayed by Ronan Vibert. Mephistopheles serves as a guide to Malachi, but also uses psychological tactics by getting him to do what Mephistopheles wants him to.
- In episode 524 of Mystery Science Theater 3000, Manos' dog is referred to by Tom Servo as "Mephisto".
- Mephistopheles appears in the Xena: Warrior Princess episode "The Haunting of Amphipolis".
- Mephistopheles is portrayed by Steve Pemberton in season 6, episode 5 of Inside No. 9, "How Do You Plead?", although humorously referred to by Reece Shearsmith’s character as "Mr Mistoffeles".
- Mephistopheles is portrayed by Jon Lovitz in a 1986 Saturday Night Live skit as a defendant in The People's Court, during which he attempts to have a pact with Vonda Braithwaite, the owner of a hairdressing salon, enforced, plus court costs awarded.
- The character Mephisto from Marvel Comics appears in the Marvel show Ironheart, portrayed by Sacha Baron Cohen.

== Video games ==
- In LaboRat's game Faust's Alptraum, Mephistopheles appears as a major antagonist, allegedly lent to protagonist Elizabeth by her deceased father, Faust. It traps Elizabeth in a manor and often disrupts her progress while trying to make her stay in the manor forever. Mephistopheles is referred to as "Mephisto" in-game and has dark purple horns, sleeves that hide its hands, and long boots that resemble hooves.
- In Devil May Cry 4, Mephisto appears as a common enemy, as well as an enemy similar to Mephisto called Faust.
- In the Diablo game series, Mephisto is the Lord of Hatred and is one of the Three Prime Evils of the game.
- In Demon's Souls, Mephistopheles is a female non-player character (NPC) who tasks the player with assassinating other key NPCs in the game.
- In Fate/Grand Order, Mephistopheles is a Caster-class Servant and a minor antagonist in the London story chapter.
- In Sonic the Hedgehog (2006), Mephiles the Dark is one half of Solaris, who seeks to reunite with his other half, Iblis, and spends most of the game manipulating the heroes to achieve his goals.
- In Neverwinter Nights: Hordes of the Underdark, Mephistopheles is the main antagonist and the final boss.
- In Call of Duty: Infinite Warfare, Mephistopheles appears as the main antagonist and final boss in the Zombies mode.
- In Digimon Story: Cyber Sleuth, a Digimon of the Growlmon species goes by the name Mephisto and possesses a hacker.
- In Animamundi: Dark Alchemist, the main character makes a contract with Mephistopheles to save his beheaded sister.
- In Shining in the Darkness the main villain in the Japanese version of the game is called "Mephisto". In the English version, his name is changed to Dark Sol, presumably in an attempt to link the game to Shining Force II.
- In the Shin Megami Tensei games, Mephisto is featured multiple times as a minor antagonist, more specifically in Devil Children Fire Book and Last Bible. In Shin Megami Tensei IV: Apocalypse, he is heavily featured in a DLC quest "A Trip to Hawaii", where he offers the protagonist Nanashi a contract where he and his friends can be taken to a tropical island forever, with Nanashi able to leave by saying "Stay, thou art so beautiful.", a slightly altered quote from Faust. If Nanashi stays on the island, he will be put into an endlessly repeating chain of events where the only way to leave is to say "Stay, thou art so beautiful.". When he does, Mephisto attacks the player in an attempt to gain his soul. If the player denies, Mephisto will be amused and attack anyway.
- In Persona 5, Joker's Persona was originally planned to be Mephistopheles, but was later changed to the fictional character of Arsène Lupin.
- In Pathfinder: Wrath of the Righteous, Mephistopheles is an NPC that can be involved in the main story and several quests depending on the player's in-game choices.
- In Limbus Company, the titular bus the characters reside in and use to get around the city is named Mephistopheles, and was constructed by Faust, whose E.G.O is called Walpurgisnacht.
- In Arknights, Mephisto and Faust appear as major antagonists.

== Other games ==
- Magic: the Gathering features a card called "Chains of Mephistopheles" in its Legends expansion.
- The Forgotten Realms setting of Dungeons & Dragons features Mephistopheles as the Archdevil of the 8th layer of the Nine Hells of Baator, known as Cania, just below Asmodeus, who rules Nessus, in rank.
- In Pathfinder's Golarion setting, Mephistopheles is a deity of the Archdevils who rules the 8th layer of Hell.

== See also ==
- Deals with the Devil in popular culture
