= Deals with the Devil in popular culture =

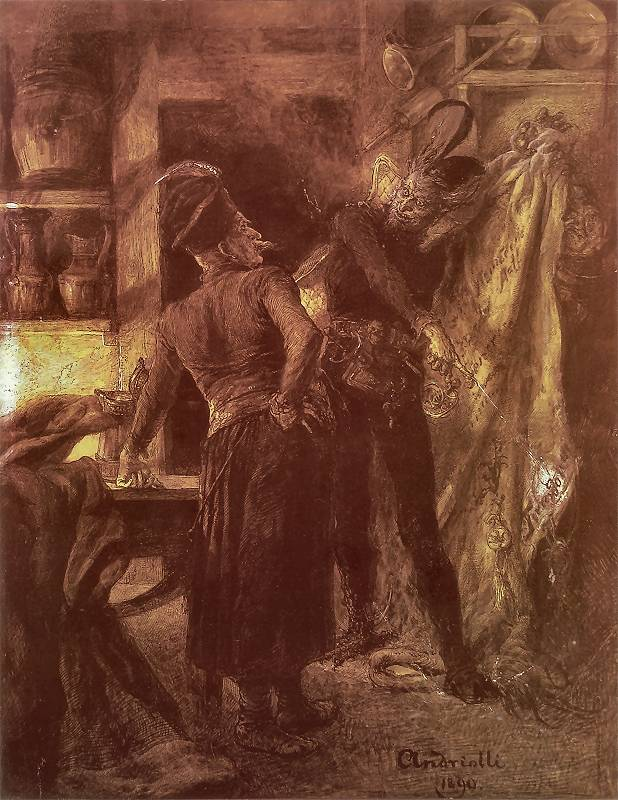
Polish folklore legend Pan Twardowski and the devil by Michał Elwiro Andriolli

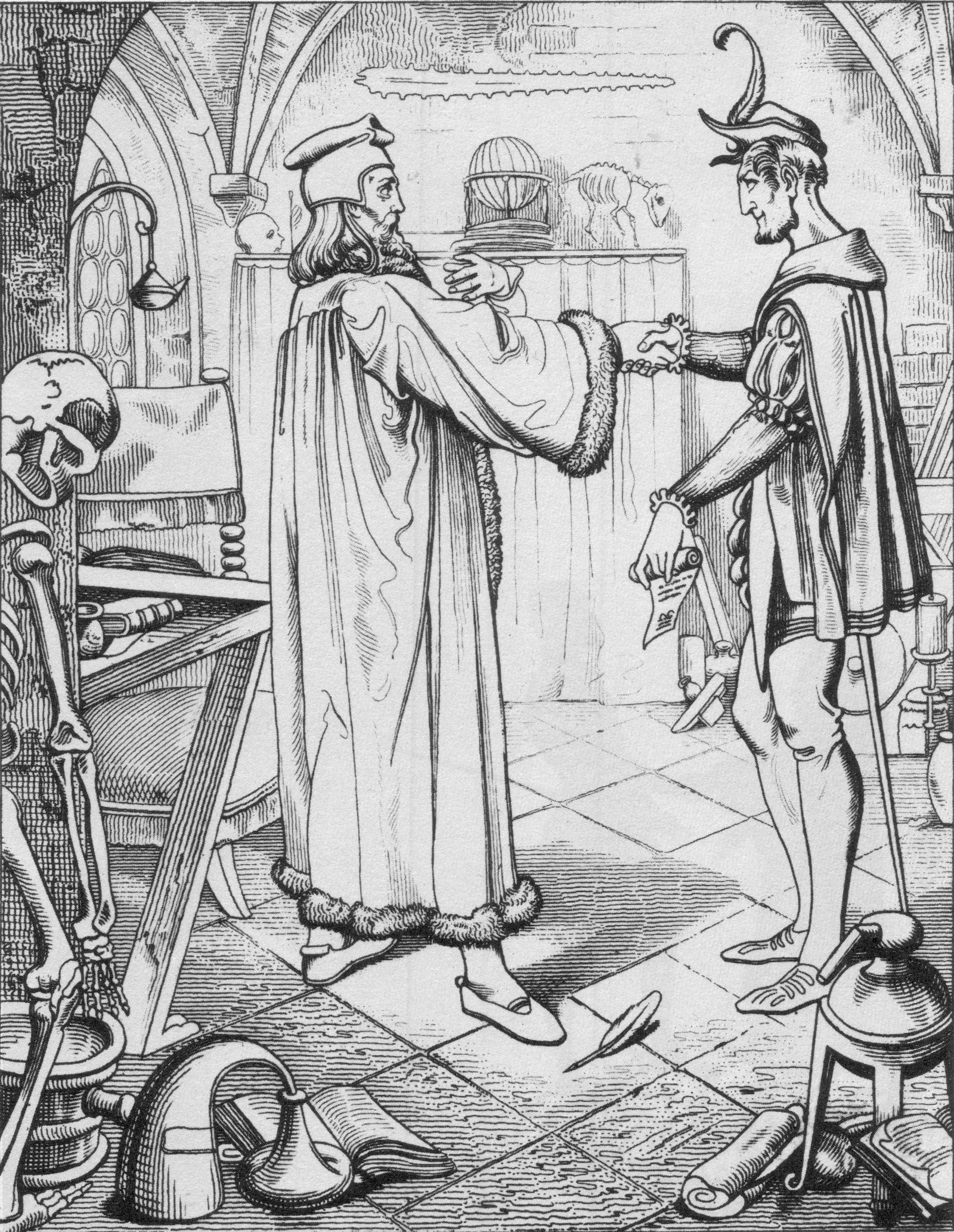
Engraving of Faust's pact with Mephisto, by Adolf Gnauth (circa 1840)

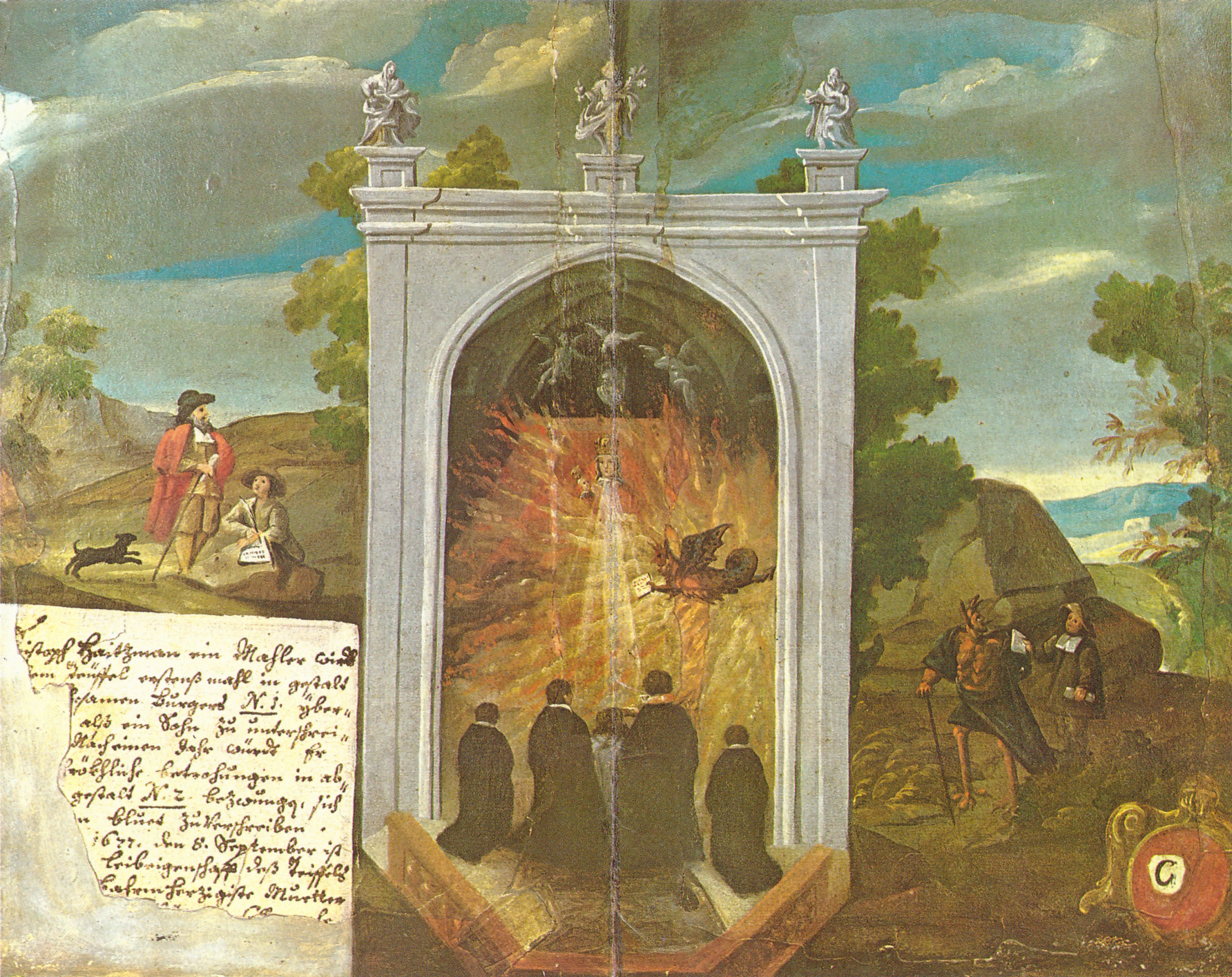
Christoph Haizmann’s 1677-78 votive painting (triptych). Left: Satan appears as a fine burgher, and Haizmann signs a pact with ink. Right: The devil reappears a year later and forces Haizmann to sign another pact with his own blood. Middle: The Virgin Mary makes the devil return the second pact during an exorcism.

The idea of making a deal with the Devil has appeared many times in works of popular culture. These pacts with the Devil can be found in many genres, including: books, music, comics, theater, movies, TV shows and games. When it comes to making a contract with the Devil, they all share the same prevailing desire, a mortal wants some worldly good for their own selfish gain, but in exchange, they must give up their soul for eternity.

Generally, when Satan is depicted in these works, he is represented as a red-skinned man with horns or pointed ears on his head, hooves or bird-legs, a forked tail or one with a stinger, and a pitchfork. When trying to blend in or deceive somebody, often he is represented as a plain human being, and, in some instances, only his voice is heard.

The theme enjoyed a long run of popularity in the 20th century. At one point Anthony Boucher, editor of The Magazine of Fantasy & Science Fiction, "reported that fully 50 percent of his unsolicited submissions consisted of deal-with-the-devil stories or 'formalities of the hereafter', which as often as not involved the Devil".

== In print ==
Novels and short stories

- Auriol: or, The Elixir of Life by William Harrison Ainsworth
- "Bearskin", fairy tale by the Brothers Grimm, in which a man gains a fortune and a bride by entering into a pact with the devil.
- "The Bet", by Anton Chekhov
- The Black Spider (Die Schwarze Spinne; 1842), novella by Jeremias Gotthelf, (1842)
- "Choosing a Game", flash fiction story by Karl Johanson. A man must win a game of his choosing against the Devil, but the Devil gets the first move.
- The Demon Pope (1888), Madam Lucifer, short stories at Wikisource by Richard Garnett
- "The Devil and Daniel Webster", short story based on the Washington Irving story; by Stephen Vincent Benét
- "The Devil and Tom Walker" by Washington Irving, (1824)
- The Devil's Elixir, novel by E. T. A. Hoffmann, (1815)
- The Devil in Love, novel by Jacques Cazotte, (1772)
- The Devil in Velvet by John Dickson Carr, a deal with the devil allows the protagonist to travel back in time in order to solve a crime.
- The Devil to Pay in the Backlands, novel by Guimarães Rosa
- The Devil Upon Two Sticks (1707), novel by Alain-René Lesage
- Enoch Soames, by Max Beerbohm
- Faust, by Johann Wolfgang von Goethe, (1808)
- "Gimmicks Three", by Isaac Asimov
- That Hell-Bound Train, by Robert Bloch
- Jack Faust, novel by Michael Swanwick
- Light From Uncommon Stars, novel by Ryka Aoki
- The Master and Margarita, novel by Mikhail Bulgakov
- Memnoch the Devil, by Anne Rice
- Melmoth the Wanderer, novel by Charles Maturin
- Mephisto, novel by Klaus Mann
- The Monk, novel by Matthew Gregory Lewis, (1796)
- Perelandra by C.S. Lewis, Professor Weston offers his soul to Satan for free, without asking for any return - with very terrible results
- Peter Schlemiel by Adelbert von Chamisso
- The Picture of Dorian Gray, novel by Oscar Wilde Dorian Gray vocally offers his soul in exchange for eternal youth so that a painting will age for him.
- The Poisonwood Bible by Barbara Kingsolver, Rachel sells her soul to the devil to get out of the Congo.
- Rosemary's Baby, novel by Ira Levin
- "Sir Dominick's Bargain" (1872), short story by Sheridan Le Fanu
- "Sold to Satan" by Mark Twain.
- Sparrow Hill Road and the related InCryptid series by Seanan McGuire, the crossroads itself is a malevolent deal-making entity.
- "St. John's Eve", short story by Nikolai Gogol
- Theophilus of Adana, a saint who made a deal with the devil, predates the Faust legend and is a likely partial inspiration.
- Timm Thaler, 1962 children's novel by German author James Krüss
- The Tragical History of Doctor Faustus, by Christopher Marlowe, (1592)
- The Unfortunate Fursey and The Return of Fursey, novels by Mervyn Wall.
- Vathek, novel by William Beckford, (1786)
- The Year the Yankees Lost the Pennant, novel by Douglass Wallop, Joe Boyd sells his soul to the Devil.
- "Young Goodman Brown", short story by Nathaniel Hawthorne

Poems

- Pani Twardowska, poem by Adam Mickiewicz, in Polish folklore and literature, is a sorcerer who made a deal with the devil.

Comic books

- Baron Mordo, story line in Doctor Strange, Sorcerer Supreme (1988) #5.
- the Black Panther, story line in Black Panther (1988) #3.
- Cynthia von Doom, Mephisto helped Cynthia get revenge against her oppressors.
- Death Note manga by Tsugumi Ohba and Takeshi Obata; Light Yagami makes a pact with a Shinigami.
- Demon Candy: Parallel, an original English-language manga by Lord Dragon Master, Jonathan is tricked into selling his soul for a Klondike bar.
- Doctor Strange, story line in Doctor Strange: Damnation.
- Faust (2021) by Alexander Pavlenko and Jan Krauß
- the Ghost Rider, story line beginning in Marvel Spotlight (1971) #5.
- John Constantine, Hellblazer story line Dangerous Habits: John Constantine cons the Lords of Hell into curing his lung cancer.
- Kuroshitsuji or Black Butler, manga by Yana Toboso
- Loki, story line in Siege: Loki (2010) #1.
- Magik's son was born in between multiple dimensions; to keep him safe, Magik made a deal with Mephisto.
- Magma, storyline in New Mutants (vol. 3) #30.
- Me and the Devil Blues, a manga series by Akira Hiramoto, tells a fictionalized story of blues musician Robert Johnson making a deal with the devil in exchange for musical talent.
- the Scarlet Witch, Wanda once used Mephisto's soul to create two children for herself.
- the Silver Surfer, Mephisto tempts the Surfer with his heart's greatest desires.
- Spider-Man, story line in One More Day, The Amazing Spider-Man (1999) #544. Spider-Man makes a deal with Mephisto to save his dying Aunt May in exchange for erasing his marriage to Mary Jane Watson from history.
- Susan Storm, story line in Give the Devil His Due.
- Team Fortress 2 comics, The Naked and the Dead
- X-23, the Red Hulk, the Ghost Rider and Venom, story line in Venom (2011) #13.

== In film ==
- American Satan (2017): An aspiring rock band who all drop out of college and move to Los Angeles to try to become famous.
- Angel Heart (1987): The Devil tries to claim the soul he was promised by a man whose attempt to escape his deal resulted in him losing his memory.
- Angel on My Shoulder (1946). "Nick" offers gangster Eddie Kagle, freshly arrived in Hell, the opportunity to get revenge on his killer in exchange for taking the place of an honest judge (who looks exactly like Eddie) and discrediting him. However, things do not turn out the way Nick wants.
- Bedazzled (1967): The main character exchanges his soul for seven wishes, each of which leads to disaster, only for him to escape the deal when the Devil spares him out of pity.
  - Bedazzled (2000), a remake of the aforementioned 1967 original, the main character making a different set of wishes that end when he uses his seventh and final wish to make an unselfish wish that negates his deal.
- Belladonna (1973), a film inspired by 19th century perceptions of medieval witchcraft; centres on a woman's pact with the Devil.
- Constantine (2004): Having informed Satan of his son's attempted coup of Hell, John Constantine asks Satan to repay their debt by releasing Isabel, the twin sister of Constantine's ally Angela, rather than simply asking Satan to bring him back to life. Satan's desire for Constantine's soul is thwarted by the realization that Constantine's self-sacrifice has earned him a place in Heaven, prompting Satan to allow Constantine's resurrection so that Constantine can have another chance to fall.
- Crossroads (1986): A young man attempts to investigate Robert Johnson's legend.
- Damn Yankees (1958): Middle-aged real estate agent and Senators fan sells soul to the Devil in return for becoming a star baseball player.
- The Day of the Beast (1995): A priest attempts to sell his soul to the Devil so that he can be there for the birth of the Antichrist so he can kill him.
- The Devil's Advocate (1997): A Florida attorney begins working for a law firm that is run by the Devil.
- The Devil and Max Devlin (1981): A crooked landlord, now deceased and in Hell, is offered redemption by the Devil if he succeeds in getting three others to forfeit their souls in exchange for his own.
- End of Days (1999): Satan offers to bring back the murdered family of ex-police officer Jericho Cane in exchange for information on a woman he is looking for.
- Faust (1994): Mixed live-action and animation, directed by Czech surrealist Jan Švankmajer.
- Faust: Love of the Damned (2000): A man sells his soul in order to get revenge on his girlfriend's killers, only to be turned into a demon in exchange.
- Ghost Rider (2007): Johnny Blaze sells his soul to the interdimensional demon Mephisto to cure his father's cancer. As with Faust, Mephisto takes liberties with his end of the bargain. Blaze's father survives his cancer, but dies in a stunt accident shortly afterward.
- Heartless (2009): Jamie Morgan makes a deal with Pappa B to have his birthmarks removed and to live a normal life; in return he is suddenly informed that the terms of the deal can change whenever Pappa B wishes it.
- H-E Double Hockey Sticks (1999): A demon-in-training convinces a rising hockey star to sell him his soul for the Stanley Cup.
- The Imaginarium of Doctor Parnassus (2009): Doctor Parnassus, a prominent storyteller, makes a deal with the Devil that allows him to keep telling his stories, unaware that the world will lose interest in his narrative style.
- The Mephisto Waltz (1971): People transfer their personalities from one body to another with Satan's help, each such change "paid for" by committing a murder.
- Needful Things (1993), based on Stephen King's 1991 novel of the same name.
- O Brother, Where Art Thou? (2000): A trio of chain gang escapees in Depression-era Mississippi encounter a black youth named Tommy Johnson, who claims to have sold his soul to the Devil in exchange for being able to play the guitar.
- Pact with the Devil (2004): A modern retelling of the Oscar Wilde novel The Picture of Dorian Gray.
- The Phantom of the Opera (1989): Erik Destler makes a deal by selling his soul to the Devil in exchange for the world loving him for his music, but the deal comes with a price: a hideously disfigured face.
- Phantom of the Paradise (1974): Swan makes a pact with the Devil to remain youthful forever, with photos aging and festering in his place.
- Poor Devil (1973), a TV movie about a minor devil (Sammy Davis Jr.) trying to get the soul of a department store worker (Jack Klugman) on orders from Lucifer (Christopher Lee).
- Rosemary's Baby (1968): Guy Woodhouse offers his wife Rosemary to the Devil for wealth and success, resulting in the birth of the Antichrist.
- Satan Triumphant (Russian: Сатана ликующий, translit. Satana likuyushchiy) (1917) Pastor Talnoх urges the flock to fight temptations, but he falls victim to temptation himself. Satan appears, pushing him to theft and a spiritual fall.
- Shortcut to Happiness (2007): A modern film adaptation of the short story "The Devil and Daniel Webster".
- Sleepy Hollow (1999): Lady van Tassel pledges her soul to Satan and becomes a witch. At the film's climax, the Headless Horseman takes her into the Underworld to fulfill her end of the deal.
- Spawn (1997): A military soldier/assassin named Al Simmons sells his soul to the demon warlord Malebolgia to become his eternal servant and leader of his army in Armageddon, in order to return to Earth to see his beloved fiancé, Wanda Blake.
- The Temptation of Barbizon (French: La Tentatio)
- Tenacious D in The Pick of Destiny (2006): A rock group quests for a guitar pick that was once a tooth belonging to Satan, and which it is implied that all rock legends used to achieve their legendary status.
- The Toxic Avenger Part III: The Last Temptation of Toxie (1989): The Toxic Avenger makes a deal with the Devil in order to get money for the eye operation for his blind girlfriend, Claire.
- Vox Lux (2018): In the final scene, the narrator reveals that the main character, Celeste, made a deal with the Devil in order to both survive a school shooting and attain pop superstardom. Whether this should be read as literal truth or simply something Celeste herself believes to be true is left ambiguous.
- The Witch (2015): Thomasin signs her name in the Devil's book so that she can join a murderous coven of witches.

== In music ==
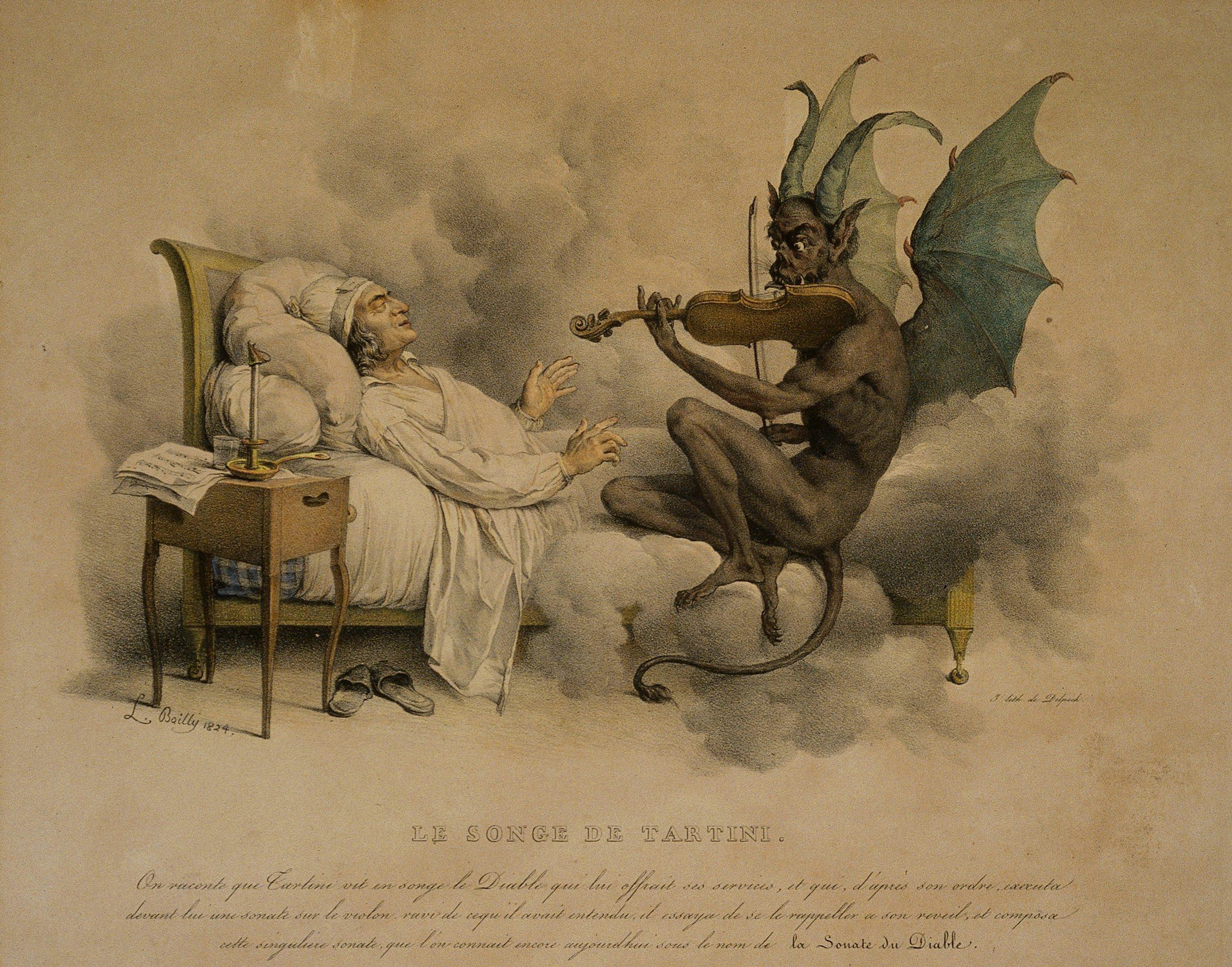
Illustration of the legend behind Giuseppe Tartini's "Devil's Trill Sonata"

Deals with the devil in music has been a constant figure in many genres, from classical music to heavy metal.

- The Black Rider by Tom Waits
- "Bohemian Rhapsody" by Queen
- "Bridge of Death" by Manowar
- "Brother Jacob" by Head East
- "Cross Road Blues" by Robert Johnson
- ”Daniel and the Sacred Harp” by The Band
- Damien Trilogy by DMX
- "Too Late" by Black Sabbath
- Devil's Trill Sonata by Giuseppe Tartini
- "The Devil Went Down to Georgia" by The Charlie Daniels Band
- Epica and The Black Halo by Kamelot, based on the Faust legend
- "In the Presence of Enemies" by Dream Theater
- Murder Was the Case by Snoop Dogg
- "Problems" by Lil Peep
- "The Small Print" by Muse, previously called "Action Faust"
- "Tribute" by Tenacious D
- "The Width of a Circle" by David Bowie
- "The Devil Wears a Suit & Tie" by Colter Wall
- "I Spoke to the Devil in Miami, He Said Everything Would Be Fine" by XXXTentacion

Operas

- Doktor Faust, opera by Ferruccio Busoni, his pupil Philipp Jarnach finished it. Based on the myth of Faust.
- Faust, opera by Charles Gounod, (1859)
- La damnation de Faust, opera by Hector Berlioz, inspired by Goethe's poem Faust.
- Mefistofele, opera by Arrigo Boito, (1868)
- Der Freischütz, opera by Carl Maria von Weber, (1821)

== In television ==
Animation

- American Dad!, in the episode "Permanent Record Wrecker", Roger makes a Faustian bargain with an infomercial star to learn to play guitar, in order to beat a hippie in a guitar challenge at his favorite coffee shop.
- Archer, in the episode "Baby Shower", Sterling Archer refers to Kenny Loggins as a "possible Faustian deal-maker".
- The Devil and Daniel Mouse, a Canadian animated Halloween TV special based on the Washington Irving short story.
- Futurama, in the episode "Hell is Other Robots", Bender is sent to Robot Hell for his sins. Fry and Leela enter Robot Hell to save him, where the Robot Devil tells them that the only way to win back Bender's soul is to beat him in a musical contest. In the episode "The Devil's Hands are Idle Playthings", Fry makes a deal with the Robot Devil so that Fry can play the holophonor and show his love for Leela. In the episode "Calculon 2.0", Fry and Bender make another deal with the Robot Devil to resurrect Calculon, their favourite actor, but the Robot Devil deliberately lets them win the deal, as he is annoyed at Calculon's overly-dramatic nature.
- Gravity Falls, in the episode "Sock Opera", Dipper Pines makes a deal with Bill Cipher, a dream demon, and is tricked into allowing Cipher to possess him in exchange for the password to a mysterious laptop.
- Metalocalypse, in the episode "Bluesklok", the band is told to make a deal with the devil to get blues-playing skills.
- The Muppet Show, in a Halloween episode that featured Alice Cooper playing an assistant to the devil, Cooper attempts to sell the Muppets a contract that promises "fabulous riches and worldwide fame" in exchange for their souls. Of course, Miss Piggy was most receptive to this Faustian deal.
- Puella Magi Madoka Magica and its adaptations contain many allusions to Goethe's Faust as the central motif of the series is the protagonists' "contracts" with the devil-like figure Kyubey.
- The Simpsons, in the Halloween episode "Treehouse of Horror IV", Homer makes a deal with the devil (who ironically turns out to be his devout Christian neighbour Ned Flanders) to sell his soul for a doughnut. In the episode "Bart Sells His Soul", Bart sells his soul to Milhouse for $5.00 when he believes that it is worthless by writing down "BART SIMPSON'S SOUL" on a piece of his church's stationery. He has a change of heart after he experiences abnormal changes in his everyday life, and spends the episode searching for it. Milhouse had sold Bart's soul to Comic Book Guy, who in turn sold it to Lisa, who bought it to return to Bart. When it is returned, Bart eats the paper to regain his soul.

Live action

- 666 Park Avenue, ABC TV series; portrays many pacts resembling deals with the devil.
- Brimstone, Fox TV series; Ezekiel Stone, a police detective who was killed and sent to Hell for murdering his wife's rapist makes a deal with the devil to recapture escaped sinners from Hell in return for which he will be allowed a second chance at life.
- Charmed, in the episode "Soul Survivor", Paige helps a businessman who sold his soul to a demon in exchange for success; the first-season episode "The Wedding from Hell" sees a rich woman forced to deal with the consequences of a deal she made two decades ago when a powerful demon seeks to marry her eldest son and conceive a demonic child.
- The Collector, Canadian TV series about a former monk who sold his soul to the devil in the 14th century.
- Friday the 13th: The Series, Lewis Vendredi made a deal with the devil to sell cursed antiques. When he broke the pact, the devil killed him and claimed his soul, leaving his niece Micki Foster and her cousin Ryan Dallion to find the cursed antiques and lock them away in the store's vault in order to neutralize their evil powers.
- G vs E, the first season on the USA Network, the second season switched to the Sci-Fi Channel; featured several people who made deals with the forces of evil. These people were known collectively as "Faustians".
- Inside No. 9, in the episode "How Do You Plead?", Derek Jacobi plays Webster (named after the lead in The Devil and Daniel Webster), a dying barrister who, it is revealed, sold his soul when he was younger to Mephistopheles to gain a successful career in the law. When Mephistopheles (Steve Pemberton), appearing as the lift attendant to his apartment, comes to claim Webster's soul, Webster tries to get out of it by offering up instead the brighter soul of his kindly nurse Urban Bedford (Reece Shearsmith, named after Urbain Grandier), but Webster is foiled at the very end when Bedford reveals that, in his youth, he was a school bully who killed a fellow student for fun, and thus Webster is sent down to Hell via the lift.
- Kamen Rider Revice explicitly portrays this in the form of inner demons that are brought out from people making contracts through a device called the Vistamp. The term itself is also used as part of the opening theme's lyrics.
- The Monkees, in the episode "The Devil and Peter Tork", Peter Tork comes across an ornate harp in a pawn shop. The proprietor of the shop, Mr. Zero (actually the devil), allows him to take the harp home and pay for it later, so long as he signs a mysterious contract. The other Monkees engage in a court battle to save Peter's soul and convince the devil that Peter does not need magic to play the harp.
- The Pawnshop No. 8 (Chinese: 第8號當舖), a 2003 Taiwanese television series which is adapted by a 2002 Hong Kong-Chinese novel of the same name, features an eponymous and fictional pawnshop which operated by Satan through means of temptation and greed, effectively function the premises as deal with the devil. The master, notably Han Nuo at the start of the plot in particular, had to sacrifice his personal life and love in order to work with Satan to conduct business, and had to comply rules to a fact that any pawned items are non-redeemable and non-exchangeable under normal circumstances.
- Reaper is about a young man, Sam Oliver, whose parents made a deal with the devil to save the father from a serious illness in exchange for the soul of their firstborn child. Oliver must now work as Satan's bounty hunter, or his mother's soul is forfeit.
- Saturday Night Live (season 12), (1986) hosted by Rosanna Arquette, (skit "The Beautician and the Beast"), Judge Wopner hears the case brought against Mr. Mephistopheles by beautician Vonda Braithewaite, who exchanged her soul for success in the hairdressing industry.
- Saturday Night Live (season 25), (1999) hosted by Garth Brooks, Brooks plays an average songwriter, who muses out loud that he would sell his soul to the devil for a hit tune. Will Ferrell, as a guitar-wielding devil, appears in a puff of smoke and they strike a deal.
- Sleepy Hollow (season 4), Malcolm Dreyfuss is revealed to have sold his soul to the devil after he drunk-drove his car into a tree and it went up in flames. Ichabod Crane also makes his own deal with the devil to defeat Dreyfuss, but expresses confidence that his allies will be able to help him find a way out of the deal.
- Star Trek: The Next Generation, in the episode "Devil's Due", an alien planet's population had made an agreement with the devil, whereby their world's problems would be solved and they would have peace and prosperity for 1,000 years in exchange for their servitude.
- Super Bowl commercial (2013), features Willem Dafoe as the devil tempting a young man to make a deal in exchange for a Mercedes-Benz.
- Supernatural features Crossroad Demons, who can be summoned by burying a box containing key items at crossroads, subsequently making a deal with the summoner where the demon will grant any request in exchange for the summoner's souls in 10 years' time.
- Trick or Treat, members of the public must sign a Faustian pact with Derren Brown and participate in a macabre game of Trick or Treat.
- The Twilight Zone, in the episode "Escape Clause", David Wayne bargains his soul in exchange for immortality and winds up sentenced to life in prison.

== In video games ==
- The Binding of Isaac, the player can sell health to the devil in exchange for other in-game benefits in "Devil Rooms".
- Cuphead, the main characters lose a bet with the devil and owe him their souls. They make a different deal with the devil, which they eventually go back on, where they can get out of losing their souls by collecting the souls of various monsters scattered around the map. Those monsters presumably owe their souls to the devil by some other means.
- Devil Maker: Tokyo, an anime-inspired role-playing card battle adventure set in Tokyo. The player's role in the game is a contractor – a person that has the capability to form contracts with devils to use them in a journey to bring light to the world.
- Guacamelee!, the primary antagonist Carlos Calaca, who was once a rodeo rider, broke his arm just before a competition, and then sold his soul to the Devil in order to have it healed before the competition. Right after winning, the Devil enacts his payment and drags him to hell.
- Magic: The Gathering features a powerful sorceress named Liliana Vess, who makes deals with numerous devils and demons in exchange for eternal youth as well as dark knowledge. After acquiring the power of the Chain Veil, she finds herself on a quest to free herself of these contracts.
- Soul series, Siegfried Schtauffen made a deal with the demonic sword Soul Edge for power and the ability to avenge his father's death, resulting in Soul Edge possessing him and turning him into the dark knight Nightmare. One of Siegfried's weapons is named Faust in reference to this story element.
- Tekken series, Kazuya Mishima makes a deal with the devil in order to obtain enough power to defeat his ruthless father, Heihachi. This deal has dire consequences, as it strips Kazuya of all the good within him, gives him a Devil Gene, and passes a Devil Gene onto his son, Jin Kazama, whose influence with the devil has made him into the main antagonist of Tekken 6.

== See also ==
- Faust - additional listings
- Mephistopheles in the arts and popular culture
