= 13 Flames Empire =

Canadian comic book publisher

- Industry: Comics
- Founded: 1999
- Founder: Ira Hunter, Robin Thompson
- Headquarters: Victoria, British Columbia, Canada
- Website: http://www.13flames.com

13 Flames Empire is an independent comic book publisher based in Victoria, British Columbia founded by Ira Hunter and Robin Thompson in 1999.

== Overview ==
Originally named Hunter Thompson Unlimited, the company changed its name to 13 Flames Empire in 2006. Ira met Robin Thompson in 1999 through an ad he put in the paper.

13 Flames Empire's titles include Champions of Hell, Zombie Jesus, and Undead Inbreds. 13 Flames Empire's comics target Mature Readers as they contain disturbing, horrifying, obscene, profane, and immoral material; they often have satanic or horror themes. However, they "are tongue in cheek, Evil Dead kind of funny"; Ira says that he has "a pretty sick and twisted, over-the-top sense of humour."

Champions of Hell came out of a horror movie screenplay of the same name that Ira had been working on.

Zombie Jesus came out of a local filmmaking contest in Victoria, called Scrapshots. The criteria were that the movies had to be done entirely in one shot, with no postproduction whatsoever. Ira entered one called Corpus Delecti (The Passion of Zombie Jesus), and surprised everyone by taking first place.

Undead Inbreds was created by Joel Shelton, with dialog by Ira Hunter and Lawrence Denvir. It debuted at the 2010 San Diego Comic Convention.

Writing for the comics is done mainly using the Marvel Method of writing with Ira Hunter supplying the outline and the dialog. Sequential artwork for Champions of Hell is provided by Robin Thompson, and artwork for the covers is provided by Tim Vigil of Faust fame.

The format of 13 Flames Empire's comics is black and white 8"x11" with "bright and violent red covers".

=== Contributors ===
- Ira Hunter
- Robin Thompson
- Tim Vigil
- Joel Shelton
- Lawrence Denvir

== Titles ==
- Champions of Hell (2000–present)
- Undead Inbreds (2010–present)
- Zombie Jesus (2004–present)

== San Diego Comic Convention ==
13 Flames Empire has had booth H02 in the small press section of the San Diego Comic Convention since 2000. In 2006, Robin Thompson dressed as the 13 Flames Empire character Zombie Jesus and wandered around the convention floor saying "If you love zombies and you love Jesus, then you have to love Zombie Jesus." Later at the Eisner Awards ceremony, Chip Kidd stated that this was his favorite quote that he had overheard at the convention.
