= Faust =

Protagonist of a classic German legend

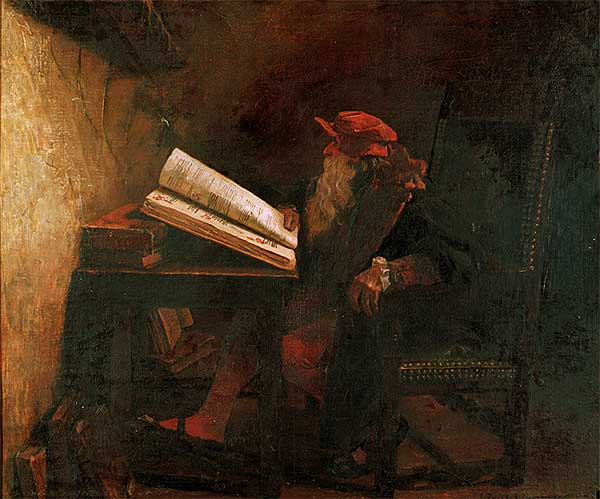
Dr. Fausto by Jean-Paul Laurens

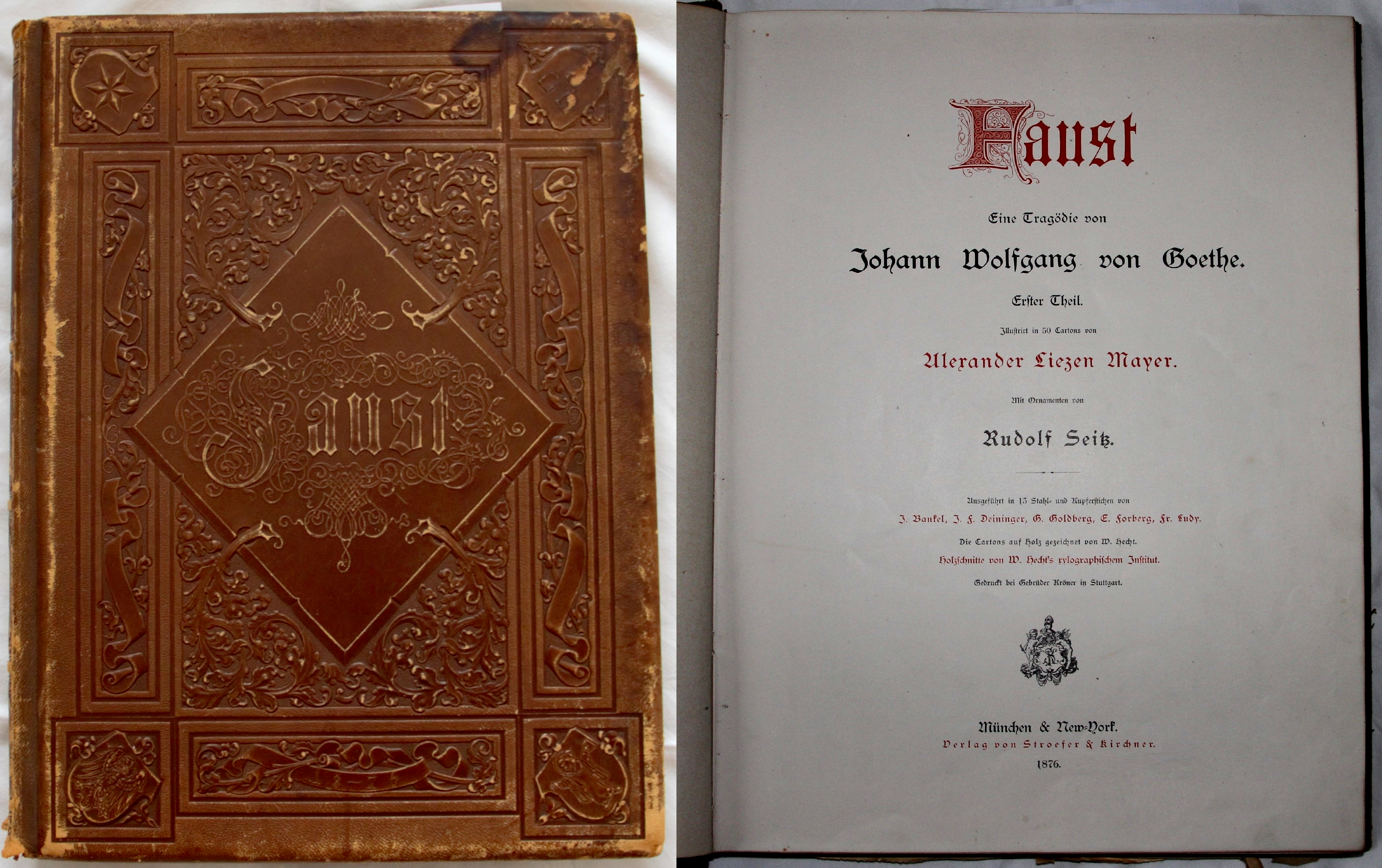
1876 'Faust' by Goethe, decorated by Rudolf Seitz, large German edition 51 cm × 38 cm (20 in × 15 in)

Faust (/faʊst/ FOWST; German: [faʊst]) is the protagonist of a classic German legend based on the historical Johann Georg Faust (c. 1480–1540). The erudite Faust is highly successful yet dissatisfied with his life, which leads him to make a deal with the Devil at a crossroads, exchanging his soul for unlimited knowledge and worldly pleasures. The Faust legend has been the basis for many literary, artistic, cinematic, and musical works that have reinterpreted it through the ages. "Faust" and the adjective "Faustian" imply sacrificing spiritual values for power, knowledge, or material gain.

The Faust of early books – as well as the ballads, dramas, movies, and puppet-plays which grew out of them – is irrevocably damned because he prefers human knowledge over divine knowledge: "He laid the Holy Scriptures behind the door and under the bench, refused to be called doctor of theology, but preferred to be styled doctor of medicine". Chapbooks containing variants of this legend were popular throughout Germany in the 16th century. The story was popularised in England by Christopher Marlowe, who gave it a classic treatment in his play The Tragical History of Doctor Faustus (c. 1592). In Goethe's reworking of the story over two hundred years later, Faust is shown to commit numerous sins and wicked acts, including the seduction of a pious girl who commits suicide, but he is ultimately saved from damnation by the virtue of pure-hearted women.

== Summary of the story ==
A brilliant scholar, Faust is embittered by the limits of science, theology, and the humanities, feeling that he has wasted his life. After a suicide attempt, he calls upon the Devil for magical powers with which to indulge all the knowledge and pleasures of the world. In response, the Devil's representative, Mephistopheles, appears. Faust trades his soul, knowingly condemning himself to Hell, for 24 years of the demon's unquestioned servitude.

During the term of the bargain, Faust makes use of Mephistopheles in various ways. In Goethe's drama, and many subsequent versions of the story, Mephistopheles helps Faust seduce a beautiful and innocent young woman, usually named Gretchen, whose life is ultimately destroyed when she gives birth to Faust's illegitimate son. Realizing this unholy act, she drowns the child and is sentenced to death for murder. However, Gretchen's innocence saves her in the end, and she enters Heaven. In Goethe's rendition, Faust is saved by God via his constant striving, in combination with Gretchen's pleadings with God in the form of the eternal feminine. However, in the early versions of the tale, Faust is irrevocably corrupted and believes his sins cannot be forgiven; when the term ends, the Devil carries him off to Hell.

== Sources ==
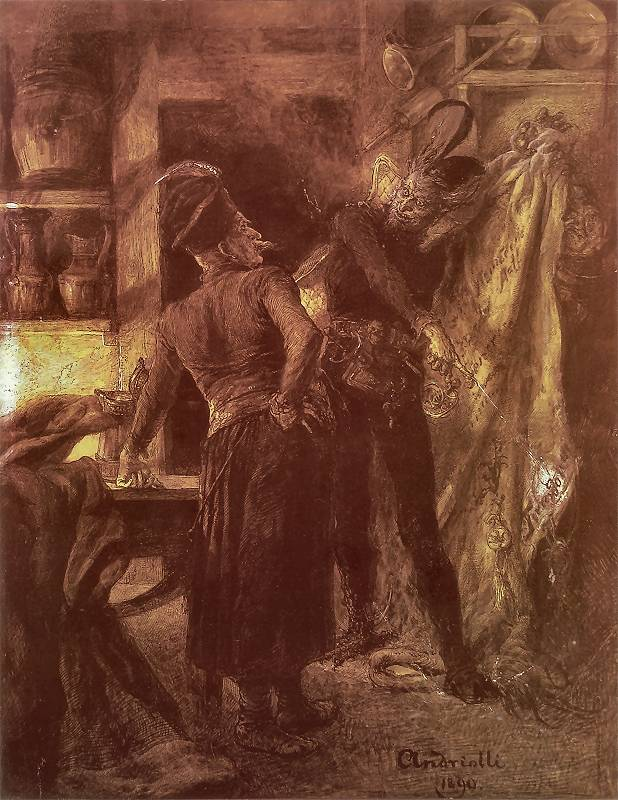
Pan Twardowski and the devil by Michał Elwiro Andriolli. The Polish folklore legend bears many similarities to the story of Faust.

The tale of Faust bears many similarities to the Theophilus legend first recorded in Greek by a "Eutychianus", allegedly an acquaintance of Theophilus. Here, a saintly figure makes a bargain with the keeper of the infernal world but is rescued from paying his debt to society through the mercy of the Blessed Virgin. A depiction of the scene in which he subordinates himself to the Devil appears on the north tympanum of the Cathedrale de Notre Dame de Paris.

The origin of Faust's name and persona remains unclear. In the Historia Brittonum, Faustus is the offspring of an incestuous marriage between king Vortigern and Vortigern's own daughter.

The character is ostensibly based on Johann Georg Faust (c. 1480–1540), a magician and alchemist probably from Knittlingen, Württemberg, who obtained a degree in divinity from Heidelberg University in 1509, but the legendary Faust has also been connected with an earlier Johann Fust (c. 1400–1466), Johann Gutenberg's business partner, which suggests that Fust is one of the multiple origins to the Faust story. Scholars such as Frank Baron and Ruickbie contest many of these previous assumptions.

The character in Polish folklore named Pan Twardowski (Sir Twardowski in English) presents similarities with Faust. The Polish story seems to have originated at roughly the same time as its German counterpart, yet it is unclear whether the two tales have a common origin or influenced each other. The historical Johann Georg Faust had studied in Kraków for a time and may have served as the inspiration for the character in the Polish legend.

The first known printed source of the legend of Faust is a small chapbook bearing the title Historia von D. Johann Fausten, published in 1587. The book was re-edited and borrowed from throughout the 16th century. Other similar books of that period include:

- Das Wagnerbuch (1593)
- Das Widmann'sche Faustbuch (1599)
- Dr. Fausts großer und gewaltiger Höllenzwang (Frankfurt 1609)
- Dr. Johannes Faust, Magia naturalis et innaturalis (Passau 1612)
- Das Pfitzer'sche Faustbuch (1674)
- Dr. Fausts großer und gewaltiger Meergeist (Amsterdam 1692)
- Das Wagnerbuch (1714)
- Faustbuch des Christlich Meynenden (1725)

The 1725 Faust chapbook was widely circulated and also read by the young Goethe.

Related tales about a pact between man and the Devil include the plays Mariken van Nieumeghen (Dutch, early 16th century, author unknown), Cenodoxus (German, early 17th century, by Jacob Bidermann) and The Countess Cathleen (Irish legend of unknown origin believed by some to be taken from the French play Les marchands d'âmes).

== Locations linked to the story ==
Staufen, a town in the extreme southwest of Germany, claims to be where Faust died (c. 1540); depictions appear on buildings, etc. The only historical source for this tradition is a passage in the Chronik der Grafen von Zimmern, which was written c. 1565, 25 years after Faust's presumed death. These chronicles are generally considered reliable, and in the 16th century there were still family ties between the lords of Staufen and the counts of Zimmern in nearby Donaueschingen.

In Christopher Marlowe's original telling of the tale, Wittenburg—where Faust studied—was also written as Wertenberge. This has led to a measure of speculation as to precisely where his story is set. Some scholars suggest the Duchy of Württemberg; others suggest an allusion to Marlowe's own Cambridge (Gill, 2008, p. 5)

== Literary adaptations ==
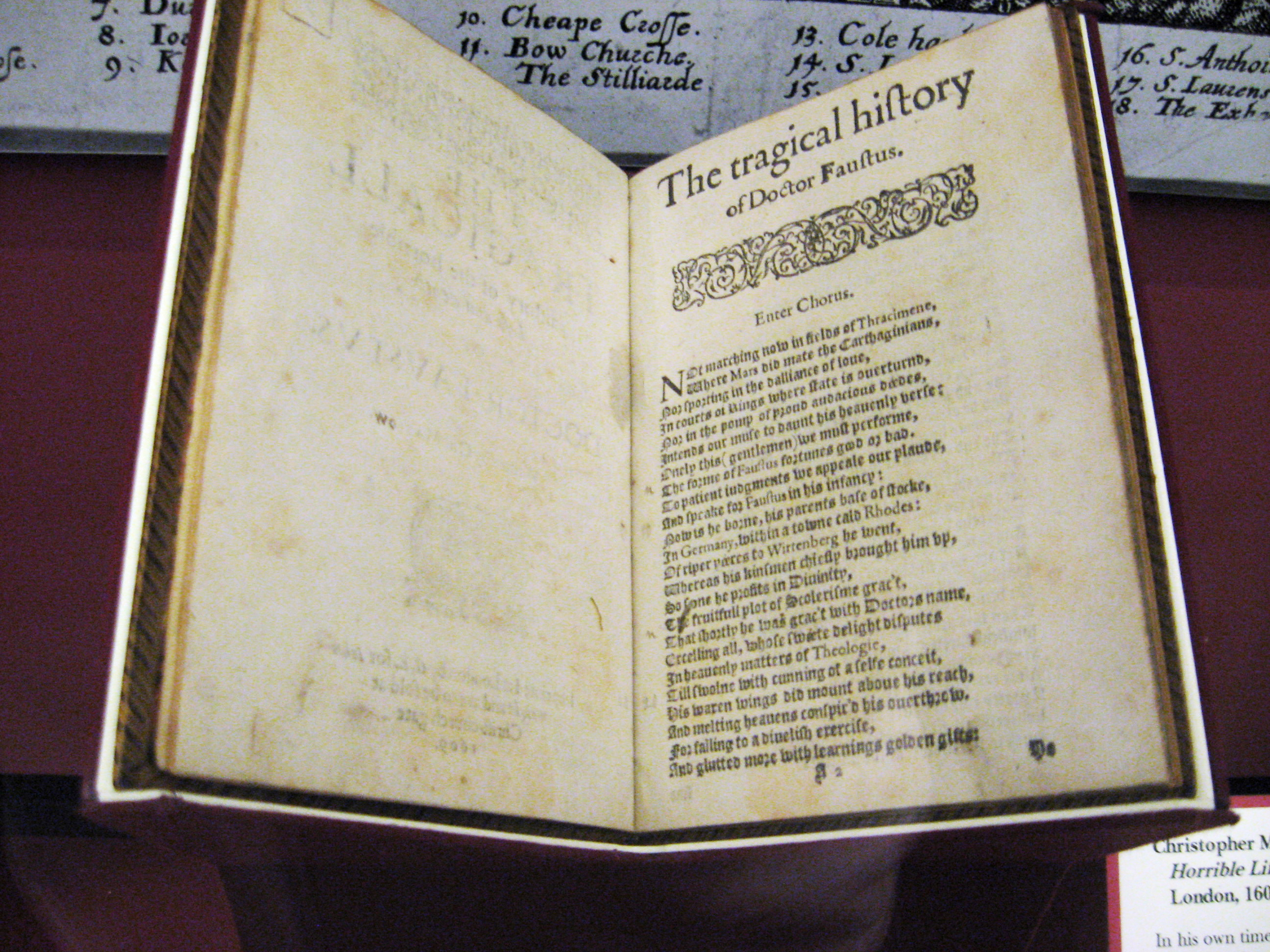
Marlowe Faustus in the Huntington Library, San Marino, California

=== Marlowe's Doctor Faustus ===
The early Faust chapbook, while in circulation in northern Germany, found its way to England, where in 1592 an English translation was published, The Historie of the Damnable Life, and Deserved Death of Doctor Iohn Faustus credited to a certain "P. F., Gent[leman]". Christopher Marlowe used this work as the basis for his more ambitious play, The Tragical History of Doctor Faustus (published c. 1604). Marlowe also borrowed from John Foxe's Book of Martyrs, on the exchanges between Pope Adrian VI and a rival pope.

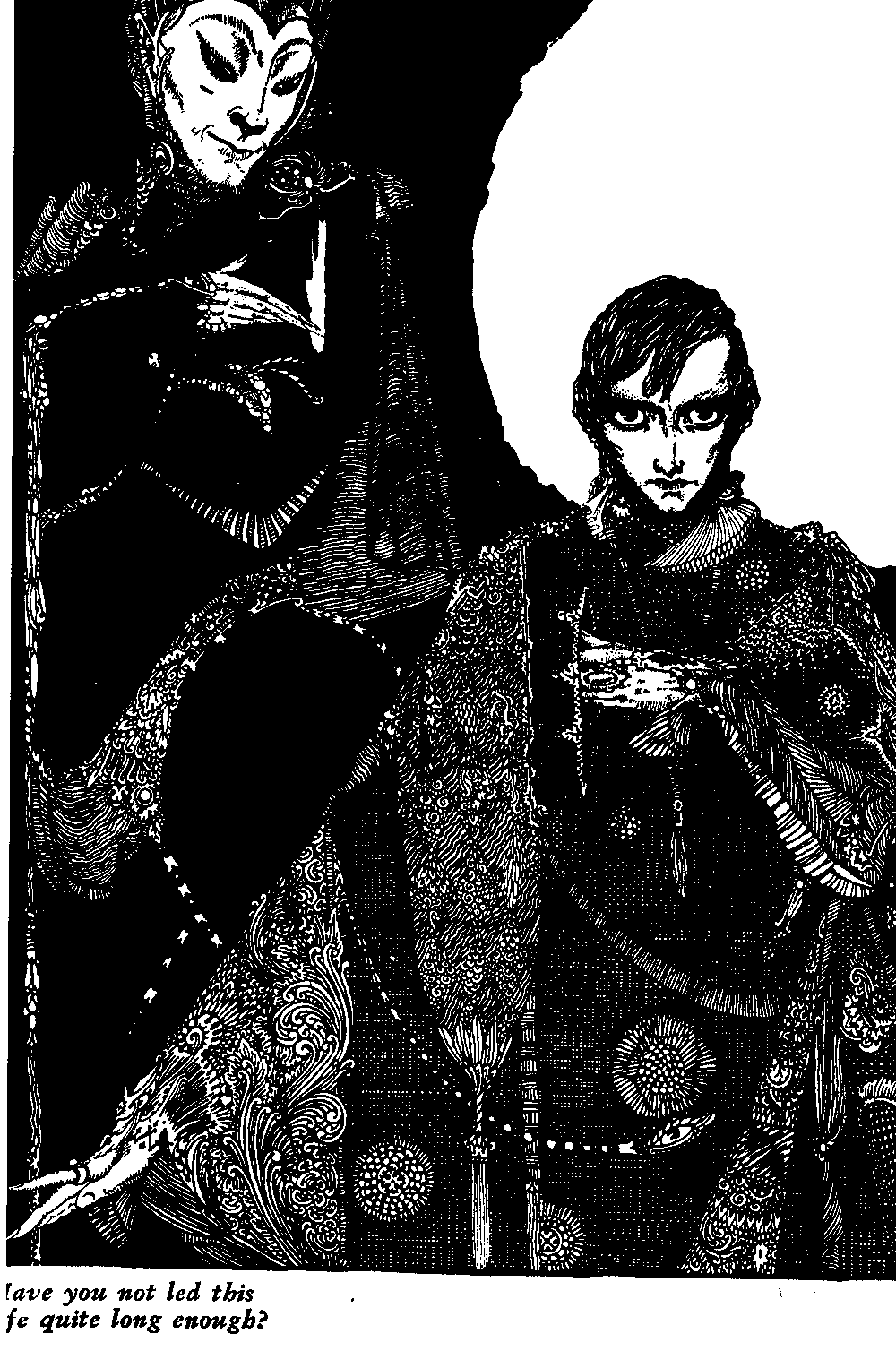
Illustration by Harry Clarke for Goethe's Faust

=== Goethe's Faust ===
Another important version of the legend is the play Faust, written by the German author Johann Wolfgang von Goethe. The First Part, which is the one more closely connected to the earlier legend, was published in 1808, the Second appeared posthumously in 1832.

Goethe's Faust complicates the simple Christian moral of the original legend. A hybrid between a play and an extended poem, Goethe's two-part "closet drama" is epic in scope. It gathers together references from Christian, medieval, Roman, eastern, and Hellenic poetry, philosophy, and literature.

The composition and refinement of Goethe's own version of the legend occupied him, off and on, for over sixty years. The final version, published after his death, is recognized as a great work of German literature.

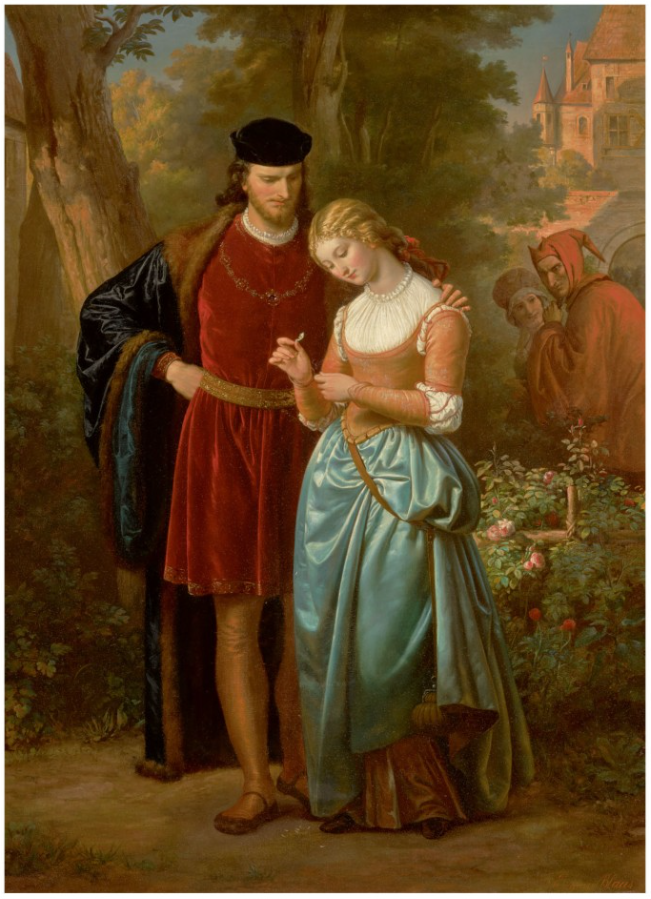
Faust and Marguerite in the Garden by Eugen von Blaas (19th century)

The story concerns the fate of Faust in his quest for the binding force of nature ("was die Welt im Innersten zusammenhält"). Frustrated with learning and the limits to his knowledge, power, and enjoyment of life, he attracts the attention of the Devil (represented by Mephistopheles), who makes a bet with Faust that he will be able to satisfy him. Faust is reluctant, believing this will never happen. This is a significant difference between Goethe's "Faust" and Marlowe's; Faust is not the one who suggests the wager.

In the first part, Mephistopheles leads Faust through experiences that culminate in a lustful relationship with Gretchen, an innocent young woman. Gretchen and her family are destroyed by Mephistopheles' deceptions and Faust's desires. Part one of the story ends in tragedy for Faust, as Gretchen is saved but Faust is left to grieve in shame.

The second part begins with the spirits of the earth forgiving Faust (and the rest of mankind) and progresses into allegorical poetry. Faust and his Devil pass through and manipulate the world of politics and the world of the classical gods, and meet with Helen of Troy (the personification of beauty). Finally, in anticipation of having tamed the forces of war and nature and created a place for a free people to live, Faust is happy and dies.

Mephistopheles tries to seize Faust's soul when he dies after this moment of happiness, but is frustrated and enraged when angels intervene due to God's grace. Though this grace is 'gratuitous' and does not condone Faust's frequent errors with Mephistopheles, the angels state that this grace can only occur because of Faust's unending striving and due to the intercession of the forgiving Gretchen. The final scene has Faust's soul carried to Heaven in the presence of God by the intercession of the "Virgin, Mother, Queen, ... Goddess kind forever ... Eternal Womanhood". The woman is thus victorious over Mephistopheles, who had insisted at Faust's death that he would be consigned to "The Eternal Empty".

Goethe's Faust is a genuinely classical production, but the idea is a historical idea, and hence every notable historical era will have its own Faust.

— Kierkegaard

=== Mann's Doctor Faustus ===
Thomas Mann's 1947 Doktor Faustus: Das Leben des deutschen Tonsetzers Adrian Leverkühn, erzählt von einem Freunde adapts the Faust legend to a 20th century context, documenting the life of fictional composer Adrian Leverkühn, as analog and embodiment of the early 20th century history of Germany and of Europe. The talented Leverkühn, after contracting venereal disease from a brothel visit, forms a pact with a Mephistophelean character to grant him 24 years of brilliance and success as a composer. He produces works of increasing beauty to universal acclaim, even while physical illness begins to corrupt his body. In 1930, when presenting his final masterwork (The Lamentation of Dr. Faust), he confesses the pact he had made: Madness and syphilis now overcome him, and he suffers a slow and total collapse until his death in 1940. Leverkühn's spiritual, mental, and physical collapse and degradation are mapped on to the period in which Nazism rose in Germany, and Leverkühn's fate is shown as that of the soul of Germany.

=== Benét's The Devil and Daniel Webster ===
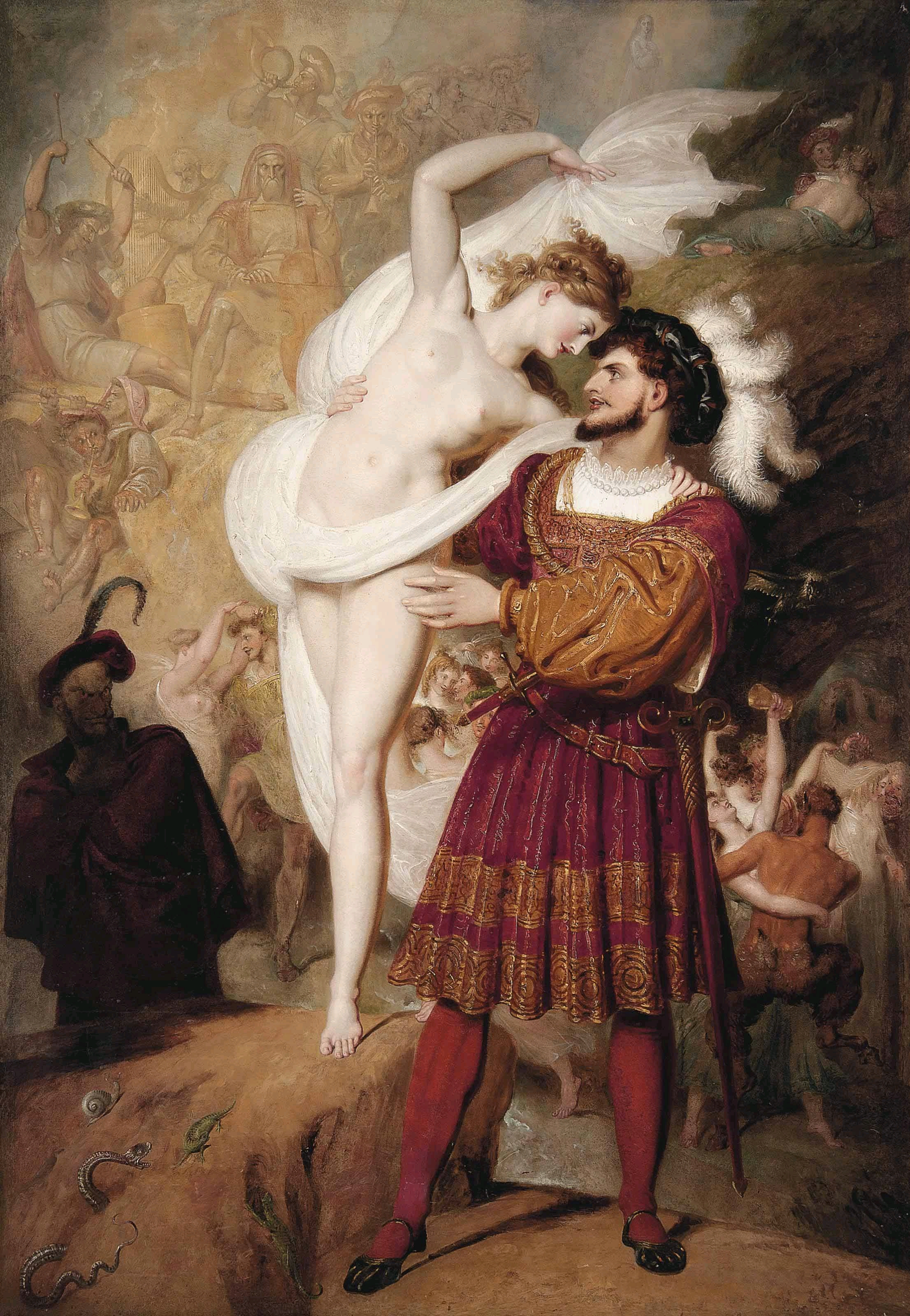
Faust and Lilith (1831) by Richard Westall

Stephen Vincent Benét's short story "The Devil and Daniel Webster" published in 1937 is a retelling of the tale of Faust based on the short story "The Devil and Tom Walker", written by Washington Irving. Benet's version of the story centers on a New Hampshire farmer by the name of Jabez Stone who, plagued with unending bad luck, is approached by the devil under the name of Mr. Scratch who offers him seven years of prosperity in exchange for his soul. Jabez Stone is eventually defended by Daniel Webster, a fictional version of the famous lawyer and orator, in front of a judge and jury of the damned, and his case is won. It was adapted in 1941 as a movie, The Devil and Daniel Webster, with Walter Huston as the devil, James Craig as Jabez and Edward Arnold as Webster. It was remade in 2007 as Shortcut to Happiness with Alec Baldwin as Jabez, Anthony Hopkins as Webster and Jennifer Love Hewitt as the Devil.

=== Selected additional dramatic works ===
- Faust (1836) by Nikolaus Lenau
- Faust (1839) by Hermann Ludwig Wolfram
- Doctor Faust: Dance poem (1851) by Heinrich Heine
- Faust: The third part of the tragedy (1862) by Friedrich Theodor Vischer
- The Death of Doctor Faustus (1925) by Michel de Ghelderode
- Faust, a Subjective Tragedy (1934) by Fernando Pessoa
- Doctor Faustus Lights the Lights (1938) by Gertrude Stein
- My Faust (1940) by Paul Valéry
- Faust '67 (1969) by Tommaso Landolfi
- Doctor Faustus (1979) by Don Nigro
- Temptation (1985) by Václav Havel (translated by Marie Winn)
- Faustus (2004) by David Mamet
- Wittenberg (2008) by David Davalos
- Faust (2009) by Edgar Brau
- Faust 3 (2016) by Peter Schumann, Bread and Puppet Theater
- Life and Trust (2024) by Jon Ronson
- Faust. Fait, non dit. (2026) by Romeo Castellucci

=== Selected additional novels, stories, poems, and comics ===
- The Devil and Tom Walker (1824) by Washington Irving
- Faust (1856) novella by Ivan Turgenev
- The Cobbler and the Devil (1863) by August Šenoa
- Fausto (1866) by Estanislao del Campo
- Mephisto (1936) by Klaus Mann
- Faust (1950) manga adaptation by Osamu Tezuka
- The Year the Yankees Lost the Pennant (1954) by Douglass Wallop adapts the Faust theme to baseball
- The Recognitions (1955) by William Gaddis
- The Master and Margarita (1967) by Mikhail Bulgakov
- Faust (1980) by Robert Nye
- Mefisto (1986) by John Banville
- Faust (1987–2012) series of comic books by David Quinn & Tim Vigil
- Eric (1990) by Terry Pratchett
- Jack Faust (1997) by Michael Swanwick
- Faust : der Tragödie erster Teil (2010) by Flix
- Frau Faust (2014–Present) by Kore Yamazaki
- Soul Cartel (2014–2017) by Haram and Youngji Kim
- Teeth in the Mist (2019) by Dawn Kurtagich
- The Master's Apprentice (2020) by Oliver Pötzsch
- The Devil's Pawn (2021) by Oliver Pötzsch
- Faust (2021) by Alexander Pavlenko and Jan Krauß
- Limbus Company (2023) by Project Moon

== Cinematic adaptations ==
=== Early films ===
The Damnation of Faust (1903), directed by Georges Méliès

- Faust and Marguerite, a short copyrighted by Edison Manufacturing Co. in 1900
- Faust, an obscure (now lost) 1921 American silent film directed by Frederick A. Todd
- Faust, a 14-minute-long 1922 British silent film directed by Challis Sanderson
- Faust, a 1922 French silent film directed by Gérard Bourgeois, regarded as the first ever 3-D film

=== Murnau's Faust ===
F.W. Murnau, director of the classic Nosferatu, directed a silent version of Faust that premiered in 1926. Murnau's film featured special effects that were remarkable for the era. In one scene, Mephisto towers over a town, dark wings spread wide, as a fog rolls in bringing the plague. In another, an extended montage sequence shows Faust, mounted behind Mephisto, riding through the heavens, and the camera view, effectively swooping through quickly changing panoramic backgrounds, courses past snowy mountains, high promontories and cliffs, and waterfalls.

In the Murnau version of the tale, the aging bearded scholar and alchemist is disillusioned by the palpable failure of his supposed cure for a plague that has stricken his town. Faust renounces his many years of hard travail and studies in alchemy. In his despair, he hauls all his bound volumes by armloads onto a growing pyre, intending to burn them. However, a wind turns over a few cabalistic leaves, and one of the books' pages catches Faust's eye. Their words contain a prescription for how to invoke the dreadful dark forces.

Faust heeds these recipes and begins enacting the mystic protocols: On a hill, alone, summoning Mephisto, certain forces begin to convene, and Faust in a state of growing trepidation hesitates, and begins to withdraw; he flees along a winding, twisting pathway, returning to his study chambers. At pauses along this retreat, though, he meets a reappearing figure. Each time, it doffs its hat in a greeting that is Mephisto confronting him. Mephisto overcomes Faust's reluctance to sign a long binding pact with the invitation that Faust may try on these powers, just for one day, and without obligation to longer terms. Upon the end of that day, the sands of twenty-four hours having run out, after Faust's having been restored to youth and, helped by his servant Mephisto to steal a beautiful woman from her wedding feast, Faust is tempted so much that he agrees to sign a pact for eternity (which is to say when, in due course, his time runs out). Eventually Faust becomes bored with the pursuit of pleasure and returns home, where he falls in love with the beautiful and innocent Gretchen. His corruption (enabled, or embodied, through the forms of Mephisto) ultimately ruins both their lives, though there is still a chance for redemption in the end.

Similarities to Goethe's Faust include the classic tale of a man who sold his soul to the Devil, the same Mephisto wagering with an angel to corrupt the soul of Faust, the plague sent by Mephisto on Faust's small town, and the familiar cliffhanger with Faust unable to find a cure for the Plague, and therefore turning to Mephisto, renouncing God, the angel, and science alike.

=== Post-war ===
Films published after 1945.

La Beauté du diable [The Beauty of the Devil]
Directed by René Clair, 1950 – An adaptation in which Michel Simon plays a dual role as Mephistopheles and the older Faust, with Gérard Philipe playing Faust as transformed into a youthful form.

Woe to the Young (Greek: Αλίμονο στους νέους)

Directed by Alekos Sakellarios, 1961 – The story of a rich old man (Dimitris Horn), who wants to be young again so as to marry a young girl (Maro Kontou), and makes a deal with the Devil.

Doctor Faustus
Directed by Richard Burton and Nevill Coghill, 1967 – A British horror film adaptation of the 1588 Christopher Marlowe play The Tragical History of the Life and Death of Doctor Faustus.:

Bedazzled

Directed by Stanley Donnen, 1967. British movie starring Peter Cook and Dudley Moore. A lovelorn loser sells his soul to the Devil in exchange for seven chances to win the girl of his dreams, played by Eleanor Bron.

Phantom of the Paradise
Directed by Brian DePalma, 1974 – A vain rock impresario, who has sold his soul to the Devil in exchange for eternal youth, corrupts and destroys a brilliant but unsuccessful songwriter and a beautiful ingenue.

Mephisto
Directed by István Szabó, 1981 – Portrays an actor in 1930s Germany who aligns himself with the Nazi party for prestige.

Lekce Faust (Faust)
Directed by Jan Švankmajer, 1994 – The source material of Švankmajer's film is the Faust legend; including traditional Czech puppet show versions, this film production uses a variety of cinematic formats, such as stop-motion photography animation and claymation.

Faust: Love of the Damned
Directed by Brian Yuzna, 2000 - Spanish English-language superhero horror film based on the comic book of the same name by Tim Vigil and David Quinn.

Faust
Directed by Aleksandr Sokurov, 2011 – German-language film starring Johannes Zeiler, Anton Adasinsky, Isolda Dychauk.

American Satan
Directed by Ash Avildsen, 2017 – A rock and roll modern retelling of the Faust legend starring Andy Biersack as Johnny Faust.

The Last Faust
Directed by Philipp Humm, 2019 – a contemporary feature art film directly based on Goethe's Faust, Part One and Faust, Part Two. The film is the first filmed version of Faust I and Faust II as well as a part of Humm's Gesamtkunstwerk, an art project with over 150 different artworks such as paintings, photos, sculptures, drawings and an illustrated novella.

Fleabitten Bargain
An episode of Wishbone (TV series) directed by Ken Harrison, 1995 – A children's television show where a dog recounts historical stories. This specific episode features Faust, a scholar who traded his soul to the devil for fun, but everything he wants comes at a price.

== Audio adaptations ==
The Christopher Marlowe play has been broadcast on radio many times, including:

- On 29 June 1932, the BBC Regional Programme broadcast "A Tragical History of the Renaissance Arranged in ten Scenes for Broadcasting by Barbara Burnham", with Ion Swinley as Faustus and Robert Farquharson as Mephistophilis.
- On 13 April 1934, the Oxford University Dramatic Society performed The Tragicall Historie of Doctor Faustus on the BBC National Programme, with R.F. Felton as Faustus and P.B.P. Glenville as Mephistophilis.
- On 11 October 1946, the BBC Third Programme broadcast an adaptation, with Alec Guinness as Faustus and Laidman Browne as Mephistophilis.
- On 18 October 1949, the BBC Light Programme broadcast an adaptation adapted by E.J. King Bull, with Robert Harris as Faustus, Peter Ustinov as Mephistophilis, Rupert Davies as Lucifer, Richard Hurndall (of Doctor Who fame) as Frederick/Third Scholar and Donald Gray as The Emperor of Germany.
- On 1 June 1964, the BBC Home Service broadcast an adaptation, with Stephen Murray as Faustus and Esme Percy as Mephistophilis.
- On 24 December 1985, BBC Radio 3 broadcast an adaptation directed by Sue Wilson, directed by Sue Wilson with Stephen Moore as Faustus, Philip Voss as Mephistophilis, Maurice Denham as the Old Man, John Hollis as Lucifer and Barrie Rutter as Robin.
- The Canadian Broadcasting Corporation broadcast an adaptation of the Marlowe play in 2001, with Kenneth Welsh as Faustus and Eric Peterson as Mephistopheles/The Chorus/The Evil Angel.
- In September 2007, BBC Radio 3 broadcast an adaptation directed by Nadia Molinari, with Paterson Joseph as Faustus, Ray Fearon as Mephistopheles, Toby Jones as Wagner, Anton Lesser as The Emperor and Janet McTeer as The Evil Angel.
- On 19 September 2021, a third BBC Radio 3 adaptation of the Marlowe play, adapted and directed by Emma Harding, was broadcast, with John Heffernan as both Faustus and Mephistopheles, Pearl Mackie as Wagner and Frances Tomelty as The Good Angel.

A five-part adaptation by Martin Jenkins dramatized by Jonathan Holloway was broadcast as part of BBC Radio 4's 15-Minute Theatre 18–22 February 2008. The cast included Julian Rhind-Tutt as Faustus, Mark Gatiss as Mephistopheles, Thom Tuck as Wagner, Jasmine Guy as Gretchen/Demon and Pippa Haywood as Martha.

== Musical adaptations ==
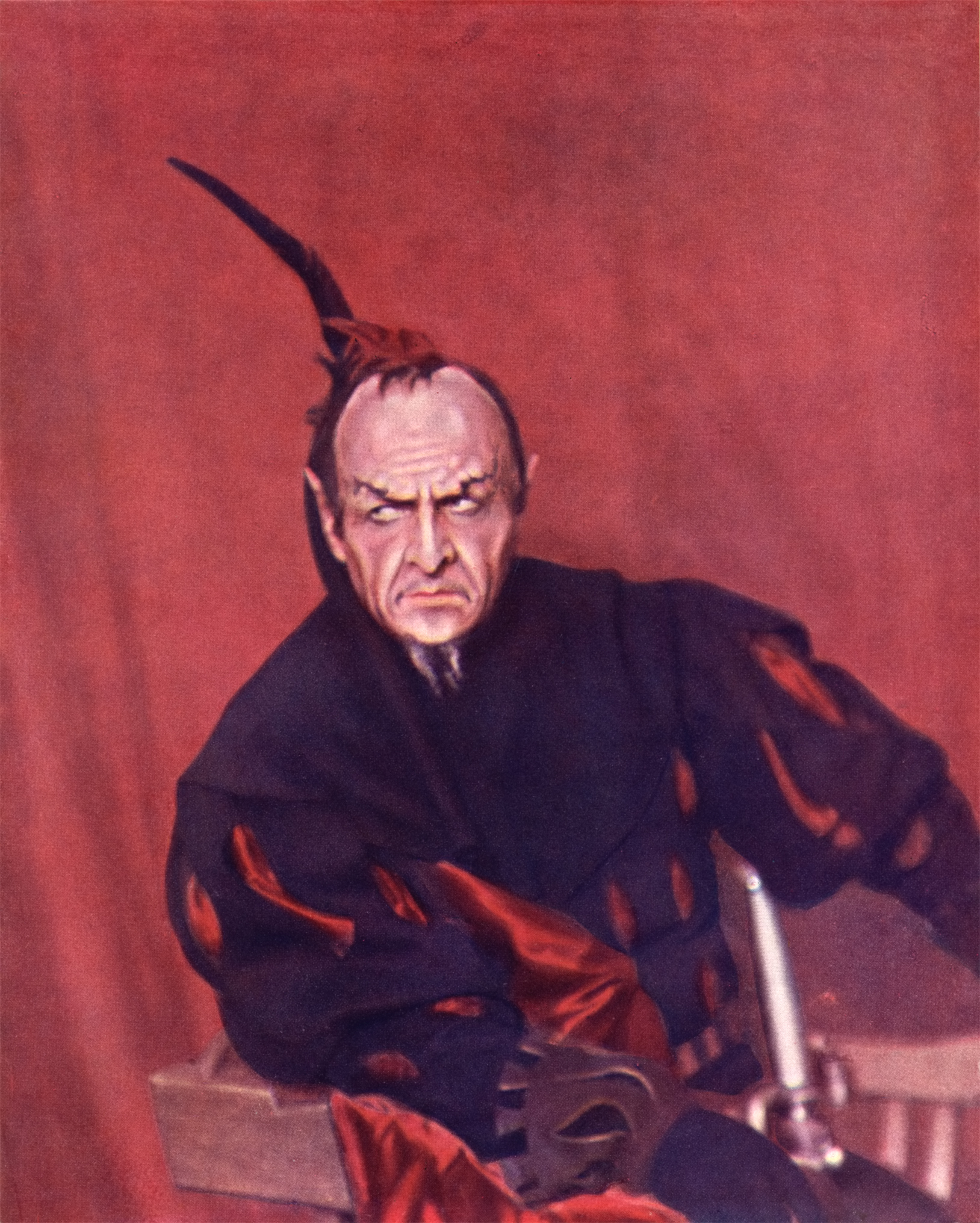
Feodor Chaliapin as Méphistophélès, 1915

=== Operatic ===
The Faust legend has been the basis for several major operas: for a more complete list, visit Works based on Faust

- Mefistofele, the only completed opera by Arrigo Boito
- Doktor Faust, begun by Ferruccio Busoni and completed by his pupil Philipp Jarnach
- Faust, by Charles Gounod to a French libretto by Jules Barbier and Michel Carré from Carré's play Faust et Marguerite, in turn loosely based on Goethe's Faust, Part 1
- Faust (Spohr), one of the earliest operatic adaptations of the story, with separate versions premiering in 1816 and 1852 respectively
- Hector Berlioz's La Damnation de Faust (1846)
- Havergal Brian's Faust (1955–6), set on Part I and in German
- Alfred Schnittke's Historia von D. Johann Fausten, composed between 1983 and 1994, and premiered in 1995
- Rudolf Volz's Rock Opera Faust with original lyrics by Goethe (1997)

=== Symphonic ===
Faust has inspired major musical works in other forms:

- Faust Overture by Richard Wagner
- Scenes from Goethe's Faust by Robert Schumann
- Faust Symphony by Franz Liszt. Liszt also wrote four Mephisto Waltzes, two of which were initially composed for orchestra.
- Second movement (German) of Symphony No. 8 by Gustav Mahler
- Histoire du soldat by Igor Stravinsky

=== Other adaptations ===
- Abraxas, a ballet based on the Faust legend by Werner Egk which has been choreographed by several different creatives
- Faust was the title and inspiration of Phantom Regiment Drum and Bugle Corps' 2006 show
- Faustian Echoes by American black metal band Agalloch.
- "Faust Arp", "Videotape", and "Reckoner" by English rock band Radiohead. From the album In Rainbows.
- "The Small Print" by English rock band Muse. From the album Absolution. Originally title Action Faust, it is an interpretation of the tale from the Devil's perspective.
- "Bohemian Rhapsody" by English rock band Queen. From the album A Night at the Opera.
- "Faust" by singer songwriter Paul Williams from the original soundtrack of The Phantom of the Paradise.
- "Faust" by English virtual band Gorillaz, from their album G-Sides.
- "Absinthe with Faust" by English extreme metal band Cradle of Filth, from their album Nymphetamine.
- "Urfaust", "The Calling", "The Oath", "Conjuring the Cull", and "The Harrowing" by American death metal band Misery Index. The first five tracks from the album The Killing Gods. A five-song, modern interpretation of Goethe's Faust.
- Epica and The Black Halo by international power metal band Kamelot. A two-album interpretation of the tale.
- "Faust" by American metalcore band The Human Abstract, from their album Digital Veil.
- "Faust" by horrorcore rapper SickTanicK feat. "Texas Microphone Massacre", from the album Chapter 3: Awake (The Ministry of Hate).
- "Faust, Midas and Myself" by American alternative rock band Switchfoot. From the album Oh! Gravity.
- "The Faustian Alchemist" by Finnish black metal band Belzebubs. From the album Pantheon of the Nightside Gods.
- Randy Newman's Faust, a rock opera written and co-produced by Randy Newman with Don Henley as Faust, Randy Newman as the devil, James Taylor as the Lord, Bonnie Raitt as Martha, and Linda Ronstadt as Margaret.
- Damn Yankees is a 1954 musical adaptation of the novel The Year the Yankees Lost the Pennant, which set the Faust theme in the world of mid-20th century American baseball. The stage musical was adapted to film in 1958 and for television in 1967
- Crossroads, starring Ralph Macchio as the Daniel Webster-like savior of an elderly Blues harpist.
- "Faust", a character from the video game franchise Guilty Gear.
- Bård Guldvik "Faust" Eithun, Norwegian drummer and convicted murderer, known primarily for his work for black metal band Emperor.
- Faust VIII, a character from the 1998 manga "Shaman King" written by Hiroyuki Takei.
- Felix Faust and his children, Sebastian and Fauna, of DC Comics.
- Faust, a character featured in the game "Promise of Wizard" released by Coly in 2019.
- Faust, a character in the 2023 video game Limbus Company created by South Korean studio Project Moon.
- 'The Wicked Trilogy', a set of three albums by German symphonic power metal band Avantasia, consisting of The Scarecrow, The Wicked Symphony, and Angel of Babylon; the trilogy is loosely based on the story of Faust
- "Faust Last Cantata", an audio drama from the Dramatic Masterpiece Show collection originating from the Uta no Prince-sama anime and game series.

== In psychotherapy ==
Psychodynamic therapy uses the idea of a Faustian bargain to explain defence mechanisms, usually rooted in childhood, that sacrifice elements of the self in favor of some form of psychological survival. For the neurotic, abandoning one's genuine feeling self in favour of a false self more amenable to caretakers may offer a viable form of life, but at the expense of one's true emotions and affects. For the psychotic, a Faustian bargain with an omnipotent-self can offer the imaginary refuge of a psychic retreat at the price of living in unreality.

== See also ==
- Frankenstein
- Robert Johnson
- "The Little Mermaid", the fairy tale by Hans Christian Andersen, that has a similar plot and themes, and is often considered a child friendly retelling
- Jonathan Moulton, also known as the "Yankee Faust"
- Puella Magi Madoka Magica, an anime franchise significantly inspired by Faust
- Shinigami, an Edo period rakugo work with a similar premise
- Faustian
