= Champions of Hell =

Comic book series

Publication information
- Publisher: 13 Flames Empire
- Schedule: Annually
- Format: Ongoing series
- No. of issues: 12

Creative team
- Created by: Ira Thompson
- Written by: Ira Hunter
- Artist: Robin Thompson with covers by Tim Vigil

Champions of Hell is a comic book series published by 13 Flames Empire, an independent publisher from British Columbia, Canada. Originally published by Hunter Thompson Unlimited, the company changed its name to 13 Flames Empire in 2006. Champions of Hell is written by Ira Hunter and illustrated by Robin Thompson with covers by Tim Vigil. The comic focuses on events set in 2013, where the Four Horsemen of the Apocalypse are wreaking havoc upon humanity. The protagonist is Sam Hain who, upon discovery of the ancient sword of Satan, is transformed into Natas. Natas is later revealed within the storyline to be son of both Satan and God. Natas is confronted by Satan's Champions of Hell to lead them in their battle against Heaven's army. By declining their invitation, Natas becomes an eternal enemy of Satan and his Champions of Hell.

In September 2008, Ira and Robin negotiated a deal to create a documentary chronicling their struggles to produce a comic book independently, with Nick Parsons.
