= Faust (comic book) =

2021 comic book by Alexander Pavlenko and Jan Krauß

- Date: October 2021
- Page count: 168 pages
- Publisher: Edition Faust

Creative team
- Writer: Jan Krauß, after Johann Wolfgang von Goethe
- Artist: Alexander Pavlenko

Original publication
- Language: German
- ISBN: 978-3-945400-78-4

Faust is a 2021 German comic book illustrated by Alexander Pavlenko and written by Jan Krauß. It is an adaptation of the play Faust, Part One by Johann Wolfgang von Goethe.

== Background ==
The impulse to make a comic adaptation of Faust by Johann Wolfgang von Goethe came when Jan Krauß saw the 2007 exhibition Goethes Faust – Verwandlungen eines Hexenmeisters at the Goethe House in Frankfurt, which featured Eugène Delacroix's lithographs for the play. Krauß loved them and thought they were very similar to pictures from a comic book, inspiring him start writing a comic manuscript based on Faust, Part One. It took years for Krauß to find a publisher interested in his manuscript, partially because the German comics artist Flix had published an adaptation of Faust in 2010. Edition Faust picked up the project and paired Krauß with the illustrator Alexander Pavlenko at the end of 2019.

Pavlenko in 2023

Both Krauß and Pavlenko prioritised having a good tempo in the book. Krauß focused especially on the scenes between Faust and Mephistopheles, as his favourite elements of the play are the demon's intelligence and how Goethe explored the unification of man and evil in the search for the good, love and creativity. Pavlenko first planned to do the book in full black-and-white, but thought the result became too "nervous", so he added first warm blue and cold yellow, before changing the latter to sepia. He mostly used three to six panels per page, with occasional large panorama panels. He frequently used visual techniques first developed in cinema.

== Plot ==
Faust, who is very learned but unsatisfied, makes a pact with the demon Mephistopheles where he exchanges his soul for knowledge and pleasure.

== Reception ==
Edition Faust published the 168 pages long book in October 2021. Andreas Rumler of the Goethe-Gesellschaft called the visuals "attractive and solid" and described them as moving between realistic and woodcut-like, without trying to be sensational. He compared the manuscript to Reader's Digest Condensed Books and children's Bibles.
