= Soul Cartel =

South Korean manhwa series

- Cover of Soul Cartel volume 1

소울 카르텔 Soul kareutel
- Genre: Fantasy
- Author: Kim Eun-hyo
- Illustrator: Kim Yeong-ji
- Publisher: Naver WEBTOON
- English publisher: WEBTOON
- Magazine: Naver WEBTOON
- Original run: 2012–2016
- Collected volumes: 1

Soul Cartel (Korean: 소울 카르텔) is a South Korean manhwa series written by Kim Eun-hyo and illustrated by Kim Yeong-ji. Started on 2012, this webtoon manhwa was released on Naver WEBTOON; its final raw chapter was published on April 6, 2016.

== Plot ==
Soul Cartel follows Si-hun Cha, a young Korean boy who is able to see the spirits of the dead. He is taken care of by his older sister, Su-In Cha, and comes from a family of powerful mediums and exorcists. Si-hun Cha himself is lacking in any spiritual abilities whatsoever aside from his ability to see spirits. Despite this, he tries to help his sister catch weaker wayward ghosts. When chasing after one of these ghosts, he runs into a very powerful demon.

The demon claims to be the Mephistopheles, or shortly, Mephisto, who wants Si-hun Cha to teach him of the modern human world and bring him books about his exploits. He states that if Si-hun Cha tries to run away, he's done for. Si-hun Cha does have the common sense to consult his sister (without revealing that he is actually caught a powerful demon's attention), but he quickly learns that even his sister would be no match for Mephisto. After Mephisto finishes a copy of Faust he reveals that he came to earth because Faust has been reincarnated. Faust was a human who had claimed that he would not be corrupted by Mephisto's temptations, so they would entered a contractual wager, with God acting as the judge. However, according to Mephisto, God had unfairly intervened at the last moment and cost Mephisto his victory.

== Characters ==
Note: There are different romanizations of the characters' name from different completed scanlation groups and the official translation by WEBTOON (Naver Webtoon). The names translated by the scanlating groups would be on the left while the names translated by WEBTOON would be on the right.

=== Main ===
Cha Shi-Hoon (차시훈)

Si-hun Cha is the main protagonist of the series. Although he is the main hero, his role in the series so far has been severely limited due to his lack of strength and skills. He only had the ability to see spirits at the start of the novel, he was more than weak. But rest assured, he is still young and in training. He has shown exceptional advancement by gaining a special move known as the 3rd hand, a super punch which is strong enough to take on an A-class demon.

Mephistopheles (메피스토 펠레스)

Mephistopheles (more commonly known as Mephisto) is one of the main characters of the manhwa and is the first Archdevil shown. He is also known as the Arch-devil of combat. His alter ego is Asura of Resentment.

Faust (파우스트)

Faust is a human who due to being reborn has decided to re-engage in his battle with the Archdevil Mephisto as a means of ensuring humans are safe. Due to said interference from god, Mephisto has claimed he never really lost. In this battle Faust was utilizing God's Papyrus, a tool with divine powers that can do anything but be used for evil, impure reasons. Faust has used that on numerous occasions to subdue Mephisto to a degree.

Cha Su-In / Cha Soo-In (차수인)

Cha Su-In is one of the main characters of the series and is the elder sister of the protagonist Cha Shi-Hoon. She took up being a spirit medium after her parents vanished during a mysterious fight with a powerful being from the underworld. After a failed attempt to rescue them from the Underworld a few years ago, she was quietly doing her job guiding spirits to the next world when she came to know that her brother had gotten into a contract with the Archdevil Mephisto and would have to go the underworld. Upon hearing this, she decided to come along to protect her brother.

=== Angels and Azraels ===
Pure angels are servants of God from birth and they maintain the peace and harmony in the underworld. They are different from Azraels, who are human souls that have gone through training to become angels

Michael

Michael is one of the four Archangels, followers of the word of God and leader of the Angels. He often shows up in order to restrain Mephisto, although he has given aide to the party many times. Faust is branded with his crest, enabling them to communicate and for Michael to know of his whereabouts. Michael is known for having the strongest defense in the underworld, supposedly unpierced since Genesis. This has earned him the title 'The Impregnable Archangel'.

Cherub / Karob

Karob is a Head Angel who serves under Michael. He is also a part of the Special Investigations Squad, and is currently assisting the party in their search for Shi-hoon Cha and Soo-In Cha's parents.

Banu / Banwoo

Banwoo was an Azrael who was sent to guide the souls down the Azrael path, but was killed by Meins on his way.

Yago / Yago

Yago was an Azrael who was sent to guide the souls down the reincarnation path, but was killed by Meins on his way. He was good friends with Faust before Faust was reincarnated and they both spent time in the library reading together.

Philer / Filer

Filer is the prosecutor in the trial for creating an illegal contract between Mephisto and Faust without God's approval. He was once humiliated by Faust as a student during a debate over the worth of human life in the front of many other students and he seeks to shame Faust during the trial. However Faust was able to win against him and Filer seems to have accepted defeat.

Luteno / Rutano

Rutano is a Chief Angel who was one of the weakest as an Azrael cadet and could not graduate for 100 years, but with motivation from Michael he used his own effort to climb up to the Chief Angel position.

=== Meins ===
Meins are souls who defy God and create fake bodies for their souls to reside in. However, as their bodies are fake they have to consume other souls regularly to maintain the condition of their bodies. Thus they wish for a human body for their soul to live in permanently, which is why they are desperately after Shi-Hoon and Soo-In as their young bodies can fetch a high price.

Minotaurus

A mein resembling a Minotaur who was initially chained up for his crimes. He was released by Mephisto on the condition that he cared for Mephisto's pet, Cerberus.

Karl / Carl

A Mein whose ability is to jump at his opponent with great force from the ground. He was the Mein who was assigned to capture Soo-In, who lost her sense of hearing in the forest trap. But ultimately Soo-In was able to uncover his weakness and defeated him, and he was arrested along with Ethan and Carl.

Ison / Ethan

Ethan had holes in his hand from which a poisonous lemon-scented gas that can kill a person within 3 seconds emits. He was supposed to kill Faust who lost his sense of smell in the forest, but due to Faust's brilliant thinking and acting Ethan was captured instead. He, Carl and Joon were ultimately arrested by the angels.

Joon

Joon was the trap maker of the forest trap which is a level 3 maze that he spent 100 years learning how to create. However Faust caught him and trapped him inside an Infinite Maze which he (Faust) learnt and created in the blink of an eye until Joon was arrested by the angels along with Ethan and Carl

Nigel

Nigel was Mephisto's enemy from a 100 years ago when he lost the battle with Mephisto and wished to obtain revenge. While searching for Mephisto in the forest trap he came across Shi-Hoon and Karob and almost killed them until Mephisto interrupted. Ultimately, in their re-battle, Nigel was killed by Mephisto who used his the source of his fire to summon Hell's Blade and burnt him to death.

Gilgath / Gilgas

A Mein initially hired by the Nesk Trading Company in order to face off with Mephisto. He was nearing the end of his "Hell's Pilgrimage", a tedious journey in which a demon must fight and survive all 4 Archangels and Arch-devils. He only needed to fight Mephisto to complete his Hell's Pilgrimage and become a "Pluto".

Gairon / Giron

The head of the Nesk Trading Company. Gairon is an extremely powerful Mein, and the first known "Pluto". He is extremely business-oriented, and will not stop at anything to further his company's strength.

Milon / Miren

A trusted worker of the Nesk Trading Company. He is a Mein who works under Gairon, reporting directly to him on several occasions.

=== Demons ===
Beelzebub (바알세불)

Beelzebub is the second Arch-devil to appear in Soul Cartel who consider Mephisto as a rival and is his younger twin brother by a second. He aims to overturn the Arch-devil hierarchy. He is also known as the Arch-devil of slaughter.

Mastema

Mastema is the third Arch-devil to appear in Soul Cartel and is Mephisto and Beelzebub's younger brother and Astaroth's elder brother. He is very fond of games and aims to play a game with Faust and corrupt him, something which Mephisto failed to do. In doing so, he wishes to prove that he is better than God.

Astaroth

Astaroth is the fourth and final Arch-devil to be introduced in Soul Cartel, and is the youngest family member out of the 4 Arch-devils. She calls herself the Mother of Devils, and is willing to do anything to ensure the devil race stand on top of the underworld hierarchic.

=== Witches ===
Irene / Airen

Irene is a young member of the Witches Clan, and the current librarian. She initially runs into the party seeking Mephisto, in order to request his help in healing the Supreme Witch. She eventually grows attached to the party, and has promised to travel with them in the future.

Supreme / Chief Witch Haelia

The Supreme Witch was the lead of the Witches Clan, and a very powerful being. She was the traitor of the witches and conspired with Meins to attack and capture Shi-Hoon, Mephisto, Faust and Soo-In. Although she supposedly wishes the best for her clan, her ideals were ultimately misguided by her deceased daughter Risella, and she was defeated by Mephisto.

Liselot / Risella

Liselot was Supreme Witch Haelia's daughter, and was a Mein-supporter who wished for the fusion of the witches and the Meins, an idea which was objected by some of the witched. After her failure to obtain approval for conducting business with the Meins, she resorted to other measures to infiltrate the Central Tower of the witches to kill off the High Witches, which includes procuring "The Book of Spell Release" to be able to dispel the spells placed around the tower. She ends up murdering Inea and was captured by the witches and burned at the stake, but not before notifying her mother of her research and intentions.

Shiole / Ciole

Shiole was the chairwitch of the witches council, and eventually went on to become the Chief Witch after the death of Haelia. Within the clan of witches, she supports the alliance with angels, and wishes to keep the peace in the underworld.

Librarian Inea

Inea was the former librarian of the Witches Clan. She focused on research to protect her clan from any danger, and managed to create a new defense spell which prevented Risella from achieving her goal. She is the mother that Irene never had as Irene's real mother died while "creating" her.

Violin

Violin has a high position in the Council of Witches and replaced Ciole as the chairwitch after the death of Haelia. She was the witch who proposed the "Fighting Chess" game to Mephisto.

=== Humans ===
Gretchen

Gretchen is a human, and the lover of Faust from his previous life. During Faust's original wager with Mephisto, he and Gretchen grew close, however a conflict with Gretchen's brother caused Faust to ruin her life. Despite this, she forgave him, enabling God to give his help to Faust.
