= Faust (1994 film) =

Film directed by Jan Švankmajer

- Film poster
- Directed by: Jan Švankmajer
- Written by: Jan Švankmajer
- Based on: Goethe's Faust
- Produced by: Jaromír Kallista
- Starring: Petr Čepek; Jan Kraus; Vladimír Kudla; Antonin Zacpal
- Cinematography: Svatopluk Malý
- Edited by: Marie Zemanová
- Production companies: Athanor; BBC; CNC; Pandora Filmproduktion
- Distributed by: Lucernafilm - Beta
- Release date: 10 September 1994
- Running time: 97 minutes
- Countries: Czech Republic; France; United Kingdom; United States; Germany
- Languages: Czech; Latin
- Box office: $2.1 million

Faust (Czech: Lekce Faust, lit. 'Faust Lesson') is a 1994 drama film directed and written by Jan Švankmajer. A Czech Republic-led production with co-production support in France, the United Kingdom, the United States and Germany, the film merges live-action footage with stop-motion animation, including puppetry and claymation.

Produced by Jaromír Kallista, the film tells its version of the legend of Faust, borrowing and blending elements from the plays by Goethe (1808–1832), and Marlowe (c. 1592–1593), with traditional folk renditions. It has elements of modernism and absurdism, and has a Kafkaesque atmosphere, enhanced by being set in Prague. The tone is dark, but humorous. The film was selected as the Czech entry for the Best Foreign Language Film at the 67th Academy Awards, but was not accepted as a nominee.

== Plot ==
The story begins on the streets of Prague on a grey morning busy with commuters. A colourless figure (Petr Čepek) emerges from a metro station. On his way home, the man encounters two men handing out flyers. It is a map of the city with a location marked. He shrugs and discards it, returning to his lodging. As he opens the door, a black cockerel runs out. The man sits down to eat, cutting himself a slice of bread. He discovers an egg concealed inside the loaf. He cracks it open but it is empty. Suddenly the lights go out and the wind rises. Objects are thrown about the room. The commotion ceases; the man goes to the window and looks down to where the two men from earlier are staring up at him. One of them holds the cockerel. The man closes the blind and returns to the table, where he finds the map and traces out the location marked using his own map of the city.

The next day, he goes to the spot indicated and enters a dilapidated building just as a man rushes from it in fear. He continues into the interior and descends to a dressing room, where he finds a charred script, a robe embroidered with sigils, greasepaint, a wig with a beard and a cap. Sitting down, he addresses himself as "Faust" and speaks to himself (the first words spoken in the film) Faust's opening declaration of intent to follow black magic.

As the opening curtain is signalled, Faust finds himself on a stage, a performance about to begin. Ripping off his costume, he breaks through the stage backdrop into a vault where an alchemist's laboratory is revealed; with the aid of a book of spells, he brings to life a clay child which grows horrifyingly into his own image before he smashes it. Warned by a marionette angel not to experiment further but encouraged by a demon to do as he pleases, he is sent by a wooden messenger to a café meeting with the two street-map men, identified as "Cornelius" and "Valdes", who gives him a briefcase of magical devices. Returning to the vault, he uses these to summon Mephisto, offering Lucifer his soul in return for 24 years of self-indulgence.

At another café, Faust is entertained by Cornelius and Valdes, who provide a fountain of wine from a table-top. He watches as a tramp, carrying a severed human leg, is pestered by a large black dog until he throws the limb into the river. Faust finds a key in his food, uses it on a shop-front shutter, and is dragged back on stage by waiting stagehands. He mimes a scene from Gounod's opera, in which Mephisto returns and the pact with Lucifer is signed in blood. After the interval, Faust visits Portugal to demonstrate his supernatural powers to the King: when a requested restaging of the David and Goliath contest is poorly received, he drowns the entire Portuguese court.

Faust is distracted from repentance by Helen of Troy, whom he seduces before realising she is a wooden demon in disguise. Lucifer arrives earlier than expected to claim his soul, and Faust rushes in panic from the theatre, meeting a newcomer in at the doorway as he bursts into the street. He is felled by a red car, and Cornelius and Valdes watch in amusement as a tramp carries away a severed leg from the scene of the accident. A policeman checks the car, but it is without a driver.

== Cast ==
- Petr Čepek as Faust
- Jan Kraus as Cornelius
- Vladimír Kudla as Waldes
- Antonin Zacpal as Old Man
- Jiří Suchý as Kašpar
- Andrew Sachs as All Voices In The English Dub

== Production ==
The film is Švankmajer's second feature. It was shot in the Old Town of Prague.

== Reception ==
Faust received positive reviews from critics. On review aggregator website Rotten Tomatoes, it has a 73% score based on 11 reviews, with an average rating of 6.80/10.

=== Accolades ===
The film was screened at the Un Certain Regard section of the 1994 Cannes Film Festival, and at the 4th Kecskemét Animation Film Festival where it won the Award of Adult Audience. It also won the Czech Critics Award for Best Animated Film, and three Czech Lions, while it was nominated for four more. At the 29th Karlovy Vary International Film Festival, it was nominated for the Crystal Globe and won the Special Jury Prize.

== See also ==
- List of submissions to the 67th Academy Awards for Best Foreign Language Film
- List of Czech submissions for the Academy Award for Best Foreign Language Film
