= Tim Vigil =

American comics artist

- Vigil at GalaxyCon San Jose in 2026
- Born: Timothy B. Vigil; September 29, 1959 (age 67)
- Area: Artist
- Notable works: Faust

Timothy B. Vigil (/ˈvɪdʒəl/; born September 29, 1959) is an American comic book artist known for horror works, including the series Faust, which Vigil co-created with writer David Quinn. The book's main storyline, Faust: Love of the Damned, was adapted by director Brian Yuzna as the 2001 film of the same name.

== Career ==
Vigil was a member of the Rebel Studios crew.

In the early 2000s Vigil was commissioned to create artwork for the drum kit used by System of a Down drummer John Dolmayan, an avid comic book collector and vendor. Dolmayan commissioned Vigil to illustrate a scene demons engaged in oral sex for one of the drums in the kit, while the art for the other drums which depicted other characters and scenes, were produced by Simon Bisley, Kevin Eastman, and Arthur Adams.

== Bibliography ==
- Grips (at Silverwolf Comics)
- Omega (a.k.a. Omen)
- Faust: Love of the Damned (at Rebel Studios)
- Caliber Presents at Caliber Comics
- Two original covers for Dan DeBono's Independent Comic Guide
- Zero Tolerance (at First Comics)
- Morella (at Verotik)
- Broken Halo (at Broken Halos Studios)
- Gunfighters in Hell (with art by his brother Joe Vigil, at Broken Halos Studios)
- Dark Utopia artbook (at Broken Halos Studios)
- Gothic Nights artbook (at Broken Halos Studios)
- Champions of Hell (at 13 Flames Empire)
- Zombie Jesus (at 13 Flames Empire)
- 777: The Wrath (at Avatar Press)
- Faust/777: The Wrath (aka "Darkness in Collision") (at Avatar Press)
- Faust: Book of M (at Avatar Press)
- Faust: Singha's Talons (at Avatar Press)
- Cuda: An Age of Metal and Magic (at Avatar Press)
- EO
- Webwitch (at Avatar Press)
