= Faust: Love of the Damned (film) =

- Theatrical release poster
- Directed by: Brian Yuzna
- Screenplay by: David Quinn; Miguel Tejada-Flores
- Based on: Faust (comics) by Tim Vigil and David Quinn
- Produced by: Ted Chalmers; Carlos Fernández; Julio Fernández; Antonio González; Bea Morillas; Miguel Torrente; Brian Yuzna
- Starring: Mark Frost; Isabel Brook; Jennifer Rope; Jeffrey Combs; Andrew Divoff
- Cinematography: Jacques Haitkin
- Edited by: Luis de la Madrid
- Music by: Xavier Capellas
- Production companies: Castelao Producciones; Fantastic Factory; Vía Digital
- Distributed by: Filmax
- Release dates: 12 October 2000 (Sitges Film Festival); 2 February 2001 (Spain)
- Running time: 96 minutes
- Country: Spain
- Language: English
- Budget: $6 million

Faust: Love of the Damned (Title in Spain: Faust: La venganza está en la sangre) is a 2000 Spanish English-language superhero horror film directed by Brian Yuzna. It is adapted from a screenplay by David Quinn and Miguel Tejada-Flores based on the comic book of the same name by Tim Vigil and David Quinn. It was produced by Ted Chalmers, Carlos Fernández Rodríguez, Julio Fernández Rodríguez and Antonio Fernández, Bea Morillas, Miguel Torrente and Brian Yuzna. The film, which was the first of nine to be produced by Filmax's Fantastic Factory label, won the award for Best Special Effects at the 2000 Catalan International Film Festival in Sitges, Spain.

== Plot ==
John Jaspers, an amnesiac wearing metal gauntlets with claw-like blades, kills multiple people before being detained by officer Dan Margolies. John almost kills Margolies but stops after the two see Claire, a woman in the shadows who quickly disappears. Margolies takes John to a psychiatric hospital. While attempting to use musical therapy on him, Doctor Jade De Camp (Note: Despite her last name being "DeCamp" (one word) in the comics, the credits list this version of the character as "Jade De Camp.") sees John staring at a death metal CD. She plays it, driving John into a rage but recovering his memory.

John turns out to have sold his soul to a man named M (Note: A reference to Mephistopheles.) to avenge the death of his girlfriend Blue, who had been murdered by gangsters. In exchange for signing a contract, M gave John the gauntlets and supernatural powers. John killed the gangsters but then learned that he had become M's slave and could not break the contract.

Meanwhile, Margolies researches The Hand, M's secret society, which was mentioned by John. At the hospital, John is taken by M's henchmen who drug him and throw him in an empty grave. John is buried alive while M threatens to kidnap Jade. John finds himself in Hell and is attacked by skeletons. After defeating them, John escapes his grave.

Before Jade is taken away by The Hand, John – now transformed into the devil Faust – arrives, killing the men and saving her. A survivor from the attack returns to M's mansion to inform him of what happened, but is seduced and killed by Claire, who turns out to be M's wife. Jade returns home after talking with Margolies. John eventually appears there, wanting to protect her from M. The police then enter, hearing her screams. John transforms into Faust and kills them while Jade flees.

Faust corners Jade on a subway and begs her to come with him. The police chief, working for M, also arrives to take Jade. Faust rescues her from the police, cutting a subway train in half in the process. Faust takes her to his old apartment where the two start having sex, but stop when she begins screaming. Jade reveals that she was raped as a child but cannot remember the attacker's face. At M's mansion, the police chief interrupts a meeting to reprimand M for not mentioning John's power. Margolies, hiding in the house, witnesses M kill the chief. M discovers Margolies shortly after.

Allying himself with The Hand, Margolies calls Jade and lures her into M's mansion. M plans to use Jade to lure John for a demonic ritual he intends to conduct. M is betrayed, however, when Claire has his doctor give him a poisoned syringe of medicine. M kills the doctor before collapsing. Claire shoots M in the head with a shotgun and tortures Jade. After Jade becomes corrupted, a still alive M imprisons Claire and prepares for the ritual.

John returns to the bridge where he first met M and has a vision of Jade in danger. He rushes to her aid and crashes the ritual as Faust, but cannot hurt M because of their contract. Defeated, he turns back into John when the traumatized Jade rejects him for M. M proceeds with the ritual, killing Claire and Margolies. A gate to Hell is then opened. M rapes Jade to humiliate John, but her childhood trauma snaps her back to full awareness and she remembers that it was her father who assaulted her. M summons a demon from the gate which proceeds to burn all of his followers to death. Jade knocks M unconscious and frees John, who kills the demon as Faust.

M tortures John, but Jade offers her firstborn child to him in exchange for John's freedom from their contract and his soul returned. M agrees and burns the contract, but in doing so John loses his powers and his earlier injuries begin to take effect. Jade then reveals that her childhood rape left her unable to conceive. Now free, John stands up and fatally stabs M, but succumbs to his wounds while Jade mourns over his body.

== Cast ==
- Mark Frost as Jonathan "John" Jaspers / Faust
- Isabel Brook as Jade de Camp
- Jennifer Rope as "Blue"
- Jeffrey Combs as Lieutenant Dan Margolies
- Andrew Divoff as "M" (Mephistopheles)
- Mónica Van Campen as Claire
- Fermí Reixach as Commissioner Marino
- Junix Inocian as Dr. Yuri Yamoto
- Robert Paterson as SWAT Team Leader
- Marc Martínez as Hapi
- Clare Leach as Nurse Ida
- Francisco Maestre as Baez
- Ronny Svensson as "Beef"
- Julia Davies as "Jonesy" Jones
- Sarr Mamadon Alex as Don
- Charo Oubiña as Rizzo
- Ferran Lahoz as Vito
- Joan Gispert as "Big Head"
- Jan Willem as "Nazi Face"
- Pedro Moya as Polanski
- Noah Yuzna as Punk
- Miguel Ángel Jenner as Patrolman Rodriguez
- Michelle Jenner as Little Jade de Camp
- Motokazu Kawamura as Stenger
- Carlos Lasarte as Shah

== Production ==
=== Development under Stuart Gordon ===
In 1991, producers Ted Chalmers and Michael Burnett (the latter a special effects make up artist on Universal Soldier and Dolly Dearest) first acquired the rights to Faust. In June 1993, it was reported Faust creator David Quinn was set to write the screenplay and Stuart Gordon to direct with Gordon having been solicited copies of the Faust comics which had piqued his interest. Speaking on the film, Gordon stated:

I was first amazed by "Faust", I'd never seen anything quite like it before. It did shock me, it was so extreme. But I found I couldn't get it out of my mind. All of the characters are fascinating people. They’re screaming to be brought to life on the screen.

At the time, it was rumored that Christopher Lambert and Bruce Campbell were being considered for roles in the film. For the role of Claire, Gordon had troubled finding an actress who wanted the part as once prospective actresses received the script they never contacted Gordon or the producers again. Gordon's first choice for Claire had been Barbara Crampton whom he had worked with on his films Re-Animator and From Beyond but was one of the women who avoided a follow-up after the introduction. Producers had reached out to Madonna's representation with Madonna ultimately passing and the producers being informed she was seeking an "image change". Gordon stated that the movie would need to find someone "brave" comparing the script to Basic Instinct whose lead role of Catherine Tramell was turned down by every major actress in Hollywood until Sharon Stone joined that film. Production was tentatively scheduled to begin in September of that year in preparation for a Summer 1994 release. The original start date was not met as according to Burnett, several meetings with studios were held as there was significant interest in the property, but due to the high level of sex and violence in the comic this proved challenging in convincing potential financiers to bankroll the film. By May 1994, Quinn stated he had written about three drafts of the screenplay with significant input from Gordon with Quinn liking some of Gordon's ideas while others were a point of contention between the two.

=== Development under Brian Yunza ===
After Gordon departed the production due to inability to satisfactorily balance the horror, thriller, and action elements of Faust in a cohesive way as well as approach the violence and eroticism of the comic in way that would make the film commercially viable, Gordon's frequent collaborator Brian Yuzna took on the project which became the inaugural project of Yuzna's Spanish based horror-focused studio, Fantastic Factory, established in conjunction with Filmax. Rather than picking an established actor to play the lead role of Jonathan "John" Jaspers, Yuzna opted to select Mark Frost after Yuzna's 12 year-old son saw Frost's showreel. A further motivation for the casting of Frost was that Yuzna wanted to cultivate a stable of regular actors to appear in Fantastic Factory productions similar to the relationship between Hammer Film Productions and Peter Cushing and Christopher Lee. The make-up effects used for Faust were produced by Screaming Mad George with the process of transforming Frost into the character taking approximately four to six hours.

== Release ==
Faust: Love of the Damned premiered at Sitges International Fantastic Film Festival on October 12, 2000, and was released theatrically in Spain on February 2, 2001.

Trimark released it on DVD in 2001, and Mosaic released a DVD in the UK in January 2002. Arrow Video re-released the DVD on 18 April 2011, containing several special features.

== Reception ==
AllMovie's review of the film was mixed: "Check your brain at the door and eat up this grisly eye candy." Jonathan Holland of Variety described it as "entertaining in a voyeuristic way but also as corny, crude and excessive as they come." Gareth Jones of Dread Central rated it 2/5 stars and called it "utter, utter trash" that is a guilty pleasure. Bloody Disgusting rated it 4/5 stars and wrote that it was much better than expected, though cheesy and corny in spots. Patrick Naugle of DVD Verdict called it "low budget horror slop with lots of T&A" of interest mostly to Yuzna fans.

== Soundtrack ==
Faust: Love of the Damned: Music from and Inspired by the Original Motion Picture Soundtrack

Soundtrack album by various artists
- Released: September 25, 2001
- Genres: Groove metal; nu metal; industrial metal; extreme metal; alternative metal
- Labels: Roadrunner; Island Def Jam
- Producer: Michelle van Arendonk (executive)

The film's soundtrack was released through Roadrunner Records and featured songs by heavy metal artists. Machine Head's "Take My Scars" was used as the film's theme song, playing over the film's opening credits. The band's song "The Blood, the Sweat, the Tears" is also featured in the film, but not on the soundtrack. Other songs included in the film but not the soundtrack are "Remanufacture" by Fear Factory, "Lady Bird" by Baby Fox, "Def Beat" by Junkie XL, and "Breed Apart" by Sepultura.

Track listing

No.	Title	Artist	Length
1.	"Replica"	Fear Factory	3:56
2.	"Loco"	Coal Chamber	4:15
3.	"Colas de Rata" ("Rat Tails")	Brujeria	1:32
4.	"Old Earth"	Sepultura	4:28
5.	"Everyone I Love Is Dead"	Type O Negative	6:11
6.	"Take My Scars"	Machine Head	4:24
7.	"By the River"	Vision of Disorder feat. Phil Anselmo of Pantera	3:36
8.	"Chopped in Half"	Obituary	3:43
9.	"From the Cradle to Enslave"	Cradle of Filth	6:37
10.	"Bleed"	Soulfly feat. Fred Durst and DJ Lethal of Limp Bizkit	4:07
11.	"Nothing's Clear"	Ill Niño	3:22
12.	"Asthmatic"	Spineshank	3:34
13.	"Choke"	Sepultura	3:36
14.	"Everything Is Untrue"	Amen	4:19
15.	"Babe"	Glassjaw	1:43
16.	"For Fuck's Sake"	Nailbomb	5:44
17.	"Bible Basher"	Deicide	2:23
18.	"Sex and Violence"	Carnivore	3:51
19.	"Timelessness"	Fear Factory	4:08
