= David Quinn (writer) =

American comics writer

- Area: Writer
- Notable works: Faust

David Quinn is an American comic book writer, known for writing and co-creating Faust alongside artist Tim Vigil. The series's main storyline, Faust: Love of the Damned, was adapted by director Brian Yuzna as the 2001 film of the same name. A spin-off mini-series, Faust: Book of M, was nominated for the 1999 Bram Stoker Award for Best Illustrated Narrative.

Among other comic book work, Quinn has co-created and written 777: The Wrath as well as written runs on Marvel Comics's Doctor Strange and Chaos! Comics' Lady Death and Purgatori.

== Career ==
Prior to pursuing a career as a comic book writer, Quinn had worked various positions as a technical writing consultant, building superintendent, and as a teacher of writing and literature. Quinn worked at DC Comics and produced This Year's Girl and Arona, which although allegedly creator-owned, were structured in such a way that the creator held the copyright while DC Comics held the trademark. Quinn's frustrations from the handling of creator ownership led to him partnering with Tim Vigil as a co-publisher at Rebel Studios.
