= Faust (comics) =

American series of comics by David Quinn & Tim Vigil

- Cover of Faust 1 (December 1988), art by Tim Vigil

Character information
- First appearance: Faust #1 (1988)
- Created by: David Quinn; Tim Vigil

In-story information
- Alter ego: Johnny Faust; Jonathan "John" Jaspers; Johnny Jaspers
- Species: Human
- Abilities: Peak human physical condition; Expert hand-to-hand combatant; Retractable forearm talons

Publication information
- Publisher: Northstar Publishing; Rebel Studios; Avatar Press
- Schedule: Varied
Title(s)
Faust: Love of the Damned
Faust/777: The Wrath
Faust: Book of M
Faust: Singha's Talons
Faust: Claire's Lust
- Formats: Original material for the series has been published as a set of ongoing series.
- Genre: Horror, superhero
- Publication date: December 1988 – 2012
- Number of issues: 15

Creative team
- Writer(s): David Quinn
- Artist(s): Tim Vigil
- Penciller(s): Tim Vigil
- Inker(s): Tim Vigil

Faust is the lead superhero character and title of a collective series of comic books by Tim Vigil (art) and playwright David Quinn (stories), released by American publishers Northstar Publishing, Avatar Press, and principally by Vigil and Quinn's own Rebel Studios.

Alongside contemporaries Watchmen, The Crow, and The Dark Knight Returns, Faust was credited with popularizing the "deconstructed superheroes" genre and the notion that "comics aren't just for kids." One of the bestselling independent comics of the era, Faust issue 1 sold over 100,000 copies with later issues averaging 50,000 sales per issue, most of which sold through several printings and editions.

The series features strong graphic violence and sexual situations. The main series is known as Faust: Love of the Damned and debuted in 1988, with new issues published irregularly, roughly once a year, or sometimes every two years. David Quinn completed a script in 1996 (when writing the proposal to sell the film). The gap between issues grew wider with time. Issue 13 was published in 2005. It then took seven years for the authors to deliver the two last issues, 14 and 15, which concluded the story 25 years after the first episode.

In 2000, Lionsgate Films released the Brian Yuzna produced feature film adaptation Faust: Love of the Damned and in July 2021, it was announced Sony Pictures Television would adapt the comic as an animated series.

== Plot ==
In New York City, Beef and Hapi, two hitmen who work for a mysterious Mephistophelian crime boss known as "M", kill a drug dealer and his girlfriend. This violence is detailed in the newspaper articles of Ron Balfour, a journalist who meets Doctor Jade DeCamp in a cafe. Jade has been fired from Bellevue Hospital and is furious over the accidental death of her patient and secret lover, John Jaspers. After Jade leaves the cafe, she and Balfour are assaulted by a gang of street punks. A horn-masked figure, Faust, then appears, laughing and singing while he slaughters the street punks with a pair of retractable forearm talons. Jade realizes in horror that Faust is John Jaspers.

Jaspers later wonders if he has spilled too much blood, or not enough. He, apparently hallucinating, sees demons everywhere. One night from his Brooklyn Heights mansion, M calls a radio station and requests to play the song "Are You Lonesome Tonight?" repeatedly, saying it should be dedicated "From M to the new kid in town", Faust. Later, it is shown that M played a role in Jaspers' Bellevue treatment. M's criminal colleagues want him to unleash his secret "Project Assassin", to eliminate Faust, unaware that Faust is M's prized killer. Jaspers then regains his lost memories of being an assassin for M, as well as the rebellion that led to his supposed "death".

== Publications ==
- Faust: Love of the Damned (#1–6 published by Northstar Publishing/Productions in 1989–1990, then reprinted by Rebel Studios; #7–15 published by Rebel Studios in 1991–2012; collected in volumes titled Faust: Communion)
- Faust/777: The Wrath (a.k.a. Darkness in Collision) (#0, 1–4 published by Avatar Press in 1998–1999, crossover with Quinn & Vigil's 777: The Wrath)
- Faust: Book of M (#1–3 published by Avatar Press in 1999)
- Faust: Singha's Talons (#½, 1–4 published by Avatar Press in 2000)
- Faust: Claire's Lust (one-shot published by Avatar Press in 2000)

=== Anthology appearances ===
- Raw Media Mags #1 (published by Rebel Studios in 1991; includes "2020: Giant Step", a then-futuristic Faust tale)
- Threshold #7 (published by Avatar Press in 1998; includes Faust/777: The Wrath prelude)
- Threshold #24 (published by Avatar Press c. 2000; includes Faust: Singha's Talons prelude)

== Bibliography ==
- Burgas, Greg (September 29, 2014). "Year of the Artist, Day 272: Tim Vigil, Part 1 – Faust: Love of the Damned #1". Comic Book Resources. Valnet Inc. Archived from the original on October 1, 2014.
- Del Rosario, Alexandra (July 7, 2021). "Faust: Animated Series Based On Comic In Works At Sony Pictures Television From Matteo Pizzolo". Deadline. Penske Media Corporation. Archived from the original on July 7, 2021.
- "Issue :: Raw Media Mags #1". Grand Comics Database. n.d. Archived from the original on March 23, 2022.
- "Issue :: Threshold #7 [Faust 777]". Grand Comics Database. n.d. Archived from the original on March 23, 2022.
- "Issue :: Threshold #24". Grand Comics Database. n.d. Archived from the original on March 23, 2022.
- "Series :: Faust". Grand Comics Database. n.d. Archived from the original on March 23, 2022.
- "Series :: Faust". Grand Comics Database. n.d. Archived from the original on March 23, 2022.
- "Series :: Faust[/]777: The Wrath". Grand Comics Database. n.d. Archived from the original on March 23, 2022.
- "Series :: Faust: Book of M". Grand Comics Database. n.d. Archived from the original on March 23, 2022.
- "Series :: Faust: Claire's Lust". Grand Comics Database. n.d. Archived from the original on March 23, 2022.
- "Series :: Faust: Singha's Talons". Grand Comics Database. n.d. Archived from the original on March 23, 2022.
- Holland, Jonathan (February 22, 2001). "Faust, Love of the Damned". Variety. Penske Media Corporation. Archived from the original on March 4, 2016.
- Johnston, Rich (June 3, 2012). "The Return Of Faust". Bleeding Cool. Avatar Press. Archived from the original on September 19, 2020.
- McCulloch, Joe; Seneca, Matt; Stone, Tucker; Mautner, Chris (February 3, 2013). "A Celebratory Conclusion: Tim Vigil and Faust". Factual Opinion. Transcription notes by Joe McCulloch. Comic Books are Burning in Hell. Archived from the original on February 6, 2013.
- Miller, Mark L. (a.k.a. Ambush Bug) (September 23, 2012). "AICN Comics Special Preview: Want to take a sneak peek at David Quinn and Tim Vigil's latest chapter of Faust: Love of the Damned? Of course you do!". Ain't It Cool News. Archived from the original on September 23, 2012.
- Quinn, David (May 1, 2012). "AICN Comics Q&@: Ambush Bug catches up with writer David Quinn on some exciting new Faust news!!!". Ain't It Cool News (Interview). Interviewed by Mark L. Miller (a.k.a. Ambush Bug). Archived from the original on May 4, 2012.
- Quinn, David; Vigil, Tim (October 26, 2012). "NYCC '12 Interview with Tim Vigil and David Quinn" (Interview). Interviewed by J. Gerick-Gutierrez. Rebel Studios. Archived from the original on April 18, 2022 – via ProBoards.
- Vigil, Tim (June 23, 2019). "The Tim Vigil (Faust, Grips, EO) Shoot Interview" (Interview). Interviewed by Ed Piskor & Jim Rugg. Cartoonist Kayfabe. Archived from the original on April 18, 2022 – via YouTube.
