= Johann Georg Faust =

German Renaissance alchemist, astrologer, and magician

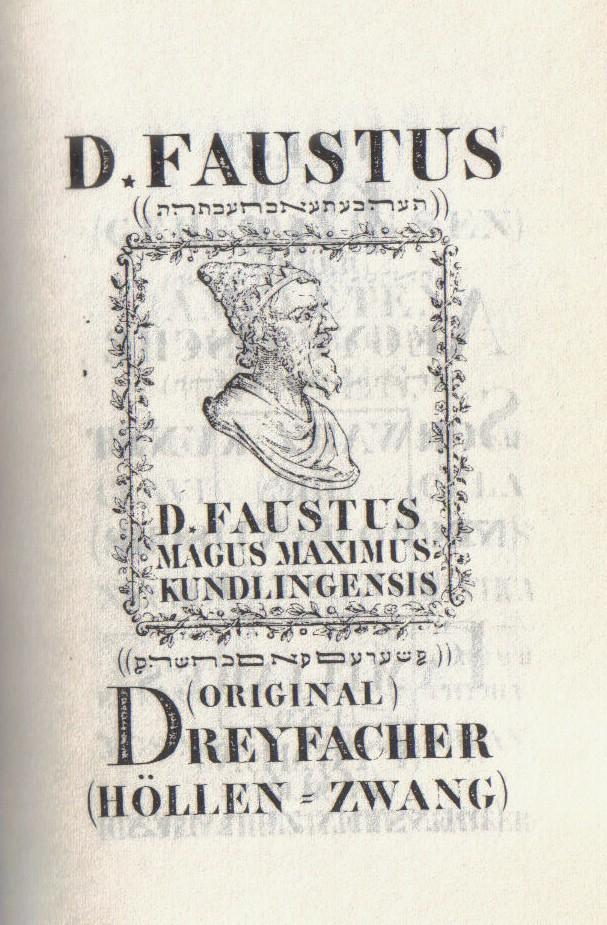
Title page of one of the Höllenzwang grimoires attributed to D. Faustus Magus Maximus Kundlingensis (18th century)

Johann Georg Faust (/faʊst/ FOWST, German: [ˈjoːhan ˈɡeːɔʁk ˈfaʊst]; c. 1480 or 1466 – c. 1541), sometimes also Georg Sabellicus Faustus and known in English as John Faustus, was a German itinerant alchemist, astrologer, and magician of the German Renaissance. He was often called a conman and a heretic.

Doctor Faust became the subject of folk legend in the years soon after his death, transmitted in chapbooks beginning in the 1580s, and was notably adapted by Christopher Marlowe as a tragic heretic in his play The Tragical History of the Life and Death of Doctor Faustus (1588-1592). The Faustbuch tradition survived throughout the early modern period, and the legend was again adapted in Johann Wolfgang von Goethe's closet drama Faust (1808), Hector Berlioz's musical composition La damnation de Faust (premiered 1846), and Franz Liszt's Faust Symphony of 1857.

== Historical Faust ==
Because of his early treatment as a figure in legend and literature, it is difficult to establish historical facts about his life with any certainty. In the 17th century, it was even doubted that there ever had been a historical Faust, and the legendary character was identified with a printer of Mainz called Johann Fust. Johann Georg Neumann in 1683 addressed the question in his Disquisitio historica de Fausto praestigiatore, establishing Faust's historical existence based on contemporary references.

In the light of records of an activity spanning more than 30 years, the two suggested birth years (1466 vs. 1480/1), the two recorded first names (Georg vs. Johann) and the two recorded places of origin (Knittlingen vs. Heidelberg/Helmstett), it has been suggested that there were two itinerant magicians calling themselves Faustus, one Georg, active ca. 1505 to 1515, and another Johann, active in the 1530s.

Possible places of origin of the historical Johann Faust are Knittlingen (Manlius 1562), Helmstadt near Heidelberg, or Roda. Knittlingen today has an archive and a museum dedicated to Faust. Baron (1978) and Ruickbie (2009) argue for Helmstadt as his place of birth.

Faust's year of birth is given either as 1480/1 or as 1466. Baron (1992) and Ruickbie prefer the latter. The city archive of Ingolstadt has a letter dated 27 June 1528 which mentions a Doctor Jörg Faustus von Haidlberg. Other sources have Georgius Faustus Helmstet(ensis). Baron, searching for students from Helmstet in the archives of Heidelberg University, found records of a Georgius Helmstetter inscribed from 1483 to 1487, stating that he was promoted to baccalaureus on 12 July 1484 and to magister artium on 1 March 1487.

For the year 1506, there is a record of Faust appearing as performer of magical tricks and horoscopes in Gelnhausen. Over the following 30 years, there are numerous similar records spread over southern Germany. Faust appeared as physician, doctor of philosophy, alchemist, magician and astrologer, and was often accused as a fraud. The church denounced him as a blasphemer in league with the devil. Faust had also supposedly joined Protestantism.

Johannes Trithemius in a letter to Johannes Virdung dated 20 August 1507 warns the latter of a certain Georgius Sabellicus, a trickster and fraud styling himself Georgius Sabellicus, Faustus junior, fons necromanticorum, astrologus, magus secundus etc. According to Trithemius, in Gelnhausen and Würzburg, Sabellicus boasted blasphemously of his powers, even claiming that he could easily reproduce all the miracles of Christ. Trithemius alleges that Sabellicus received a teaching position in Sickingen in 1507, which he abused by indulging in sodomy with his male students, evading punishment by a timely escape.

Conrad Mutianus Rufus in 1513 recounts a meeting with a chiromanticus called Georgius Faustus, Helmitheus Heidelbergensis (likely for hemitheus, "demigod of Heidelberg"), overhearing his vain and foolish boasts in an Erfurt inn.

On 23 February 1520, Faust was in Bamberg, doing a horoscope for the bishop and the town, for which he received the sum of 10 gulden.

In 1528, Faust visited Ingolstadt, whence he was banished shortly after. In 1532 he seems to have tried to enter Nürnberg, according to an unflattering note made by the junior mayor of the city to "deny free passage to the great nigromancer and sodomite Doctor Faustus" (Doctor Faustus, dem großen Sodomiten und Nigromantico in furt glait ablainen). Later records give a more positive verdict; thus the Tübingen professor Joachim Camerarius in 1536 recognises Faust as a respectable astrologer, and physician Philipp Begardi of Worms in 1539 praises his medical knowledge. The last direct attestation of Faust dates to 25 June 1535, when his presence was recorded in Münster during the Anabaptist rebellion.

Faust's death is dated to 1540 or 1541. He allegedly died in an explosion of an alchemical experiment in the "Hotel zum Löwen" in Staufen im Breisgau. His body is reported to have been found in a "grievously mutilated" state which was interpreted by his clerical and scholarly enemies as proof that the devil had come to collect him in person. In 1548, the theologian Johann Gast in his sermones conviviales states that Faust had suffered a dreadful death, and would keep turning his face to the earth in spite of the body being turned on its back several times. In his 1548 account, Gast also mentions a personal meeting with Faust in Basel during which Faust provided the cook with poultry of a strange kind. According to Gast, Faust travelled with a dog and a horse, and there were rumours that the dog would sometimes transform into a servant.

Another posthumous account is that of Johannes Manlius, drawing on notes by Melanchthon, in his Locorum communium collectanea dating to 1562. According to Manlius, Johannes Faustus was a personal acquaintance of Melanchthon's and had studied in Kraków. Manlius' account is already suffused with legendary elements, and cannot be taken at face value as a historical source. Manlius recounts that Faust had boasted that the victories of the German emperor in Italy were due to his magical intervention. In Venice, he allegedly attempted to fly, but was thrown to the ground by the devil. Johannes Wier in de prestigiis daemonum (1568) recounts that Faustus had been arrested in Batenburg because he had recommended that the local chaplain called Dorstenius should use arsenic to get rid of his stubble. Dorstenius smeared his face with the poison, upon which he lost not only his beard but also much of his skin, an anecdote Wier says he heard from the victim himself. Philipp Camerarius in 1602 still claims to have heard tales of Faust directly from people who had met him in person, but from the publication of the 1587 Faustbuch, it becomes impossible to separate historical anecdotes from rumour and legend.

The town of Bad Kreuznach has a "Faust Haus" restaurant reportedly built in 1492 on the site of "the home of the legendary Magister Johann Georg Sabellicus Faust".

=== Ascribed works ===
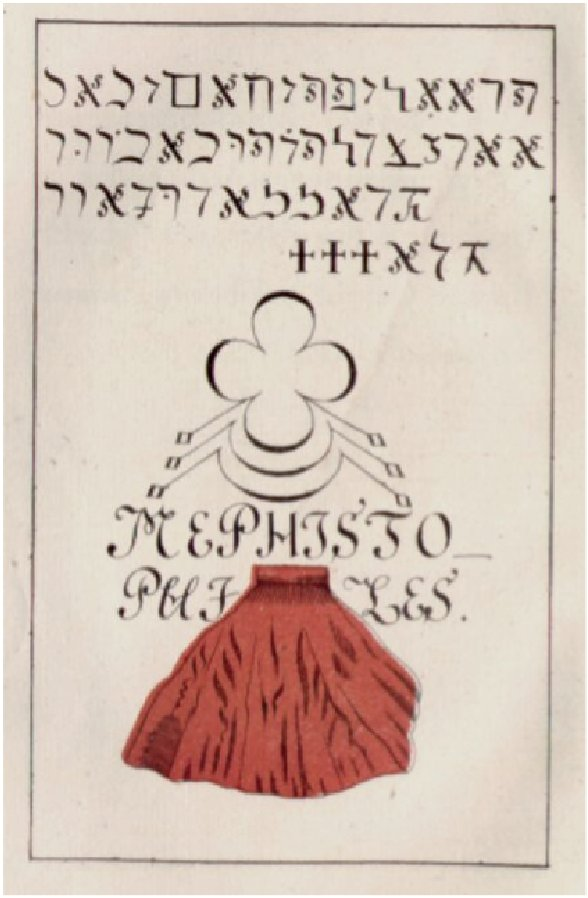
Page of Praxis Magia Faustiana (1527)

There are several prints of grimoires or magical texts attributed to Faust. Some of them are artificially dated to his lifetime, either to "1540", or to "1501", "1510", etc., some even to unreasonably early dates, such as "1405" and "1469". The prints in fact date to the late 16th century, from ca. 1580, i.e. the same period of the development of the Volksbuch tradition. The Höllenzwang text is also extant in manuscript versions from the late 16th century. A manuscript of c. 1700 under the title Doctoris Johannis Fausti Morenstern practicirter Höllenzwang genant Der schwarze Mohr. Ann(o) MCCCCVII (i.e. "1407") includes the text which in print is known as Dr. Faustens sogenannter schwartzer Mohren-Stern, gedruckt zu London 1510. Variants of the Höllenzwang attributed to Faust continued to be published for the next 200 years, well into the 18th century.

- 1501 Doctor Faustens dreyfacher Höllenzwang (Rome 1501, Engel (1885) no. 335)
- 1501 Geister-Commando (Tabellae Rabellinae Geister Commando id est Magiae Albae et Nigrae Citatio Generalis), Rome (reprint Scheible 1849, ARW, "Moonchild-Edition" 3, Munich 1977)
- 1501 D.Faustus vierfacher Höllen-Zwang (Rome 1501, Engel (1885) no. 336; reprint Scheible 1849, ARW "Moonchild-Edition" 4, Munich 1976, 1977)
- 1505 Doctoris Johannis Fausti Cabalae Nigrae (Passau 1505, Engel (1885) no. 337; reprint Scheible 1849, ARW "Moonchild-Edition" 2, Munich 1976, 1977)
- 1510 The black stair of Doctor John Faust London, Engel (1885) no. 343.
- 1520 Fausts dreifacher Höllenzwang (D.Faustus Magus Maximus Kundlingensis Original Dreyfacher Höllenzwang id est Die Ägyptische Schwarzkunst), "Egyptian Nigromancy, magical seals for the invocation of seven spirits. (reprint ARW "Moonchild-Edition" 3, Munich 1976, 1977)
- 1524 Johannis Fausti Manual Höllenzwang (Wittenberg 1524 reprint Scheible 1849, ARW "Moonchild-Edition" 6, Munich 1976, 1977)
- 1527 Praxis Magia Faustiana, (Passau, reprint Scheible 1849, ARW "Moonchild-Edition" 4, Munich 1976, 1977)
- 1540, Fausti Höllenzwang oder Mirakul-Kunst und Wunder-Buch (Wittenberg 1540, reprint Scheible 1849, ARW "Moonchild-Edition" 4, Munich 1976, 1977)
- Doctor Fausts großer und gewaltiger Höllenzwang (Prague, reprint ARW "Moonchild-Edition" 7, Munich 1977)
- 1669? Dr. Johann Faustens Miracul-Kunst- und Wunder-Buch oder der schwarze Rabe auch der Dreifache Höllenzwang genannt (Lyon M.C.D.XXXXXXIX, reprint ARW "Moonchild-Edition" 7, Munich 1977)
- D. I. Fausti Schwartzer Rabe (undated, 16th century, reprint Scheible 1849, ARW, "Moonchild-Edition" 3, Munich 1976, 1977)
- 1692 Doctor Faust's großer und gewaltiger Meergeist, worinn Lucifer und drey Meergeister um Schätze aus den Gewässern zu holen, beschworen werden (Amsterdam, reprint ARW "Moonchild-Edition" 1, Munich 1977)

These works were collected and edited in Das Kloster by J. Scheible (1849), and based on Scheible in 1976 and 1977 by the Arbeitsgemeinschaft für Religions- und Weltanschauungsfragen, in the "Moonchild-Edition", and again as facsimile by Poseidon Press and Fourier Verlag.

== Faust in legend and literature ==
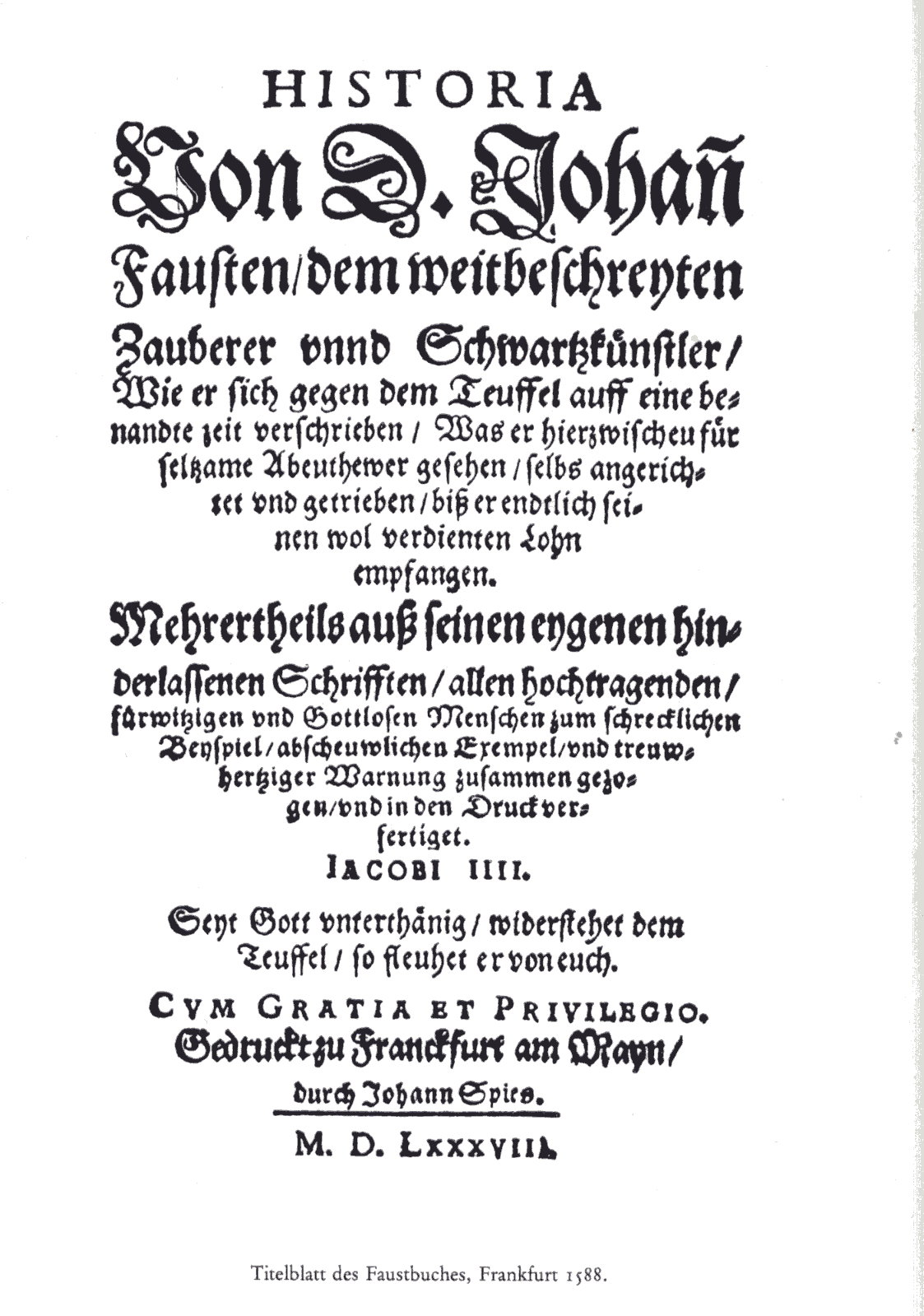
Title page of a 1588 edition of the Faustbuch

The Historia von D. Johann Fausten printed by Johann Spies 1587, a German chapbook about Faust's sins, is at the beginning of the literary tradition of the Faust character. It was translated into English in 1587, where it came to the attention of Christopher Marlowe. Marlowe's The Tragical History of Doctor Faustus of 1589 portrays Faust as the archetypical adept of Renaissance magic. In the 17th century, Marlowe's work was re-introduced to Germany in the form of popular plays, which over time reduced Faust to a merely comical figure for popular amusement. Meanwhile, the chapbook of Spies was edited and excerpted by G. R. Widmann and Nikolaus Pfitzer, and was finally re-published anonymously in modernised form in the early 18th century, as the Faustbuch des Christlich Meynenden. This edition became widely known and was also read by Goethe in his youth. As summarized by Richard Stecher, this version is the account of a young man called Johann Faust, son of a peasant, who studies theology in Wittenberg, besides medicine, astrology and "other magical arts". His boundless desire for knowledge leads him to conjure the devil in a wood near Wittenberg, who appears in the shape of a greyfriar who calls himself Mephistopheles.

Faust enters a pact with the devil, pledging his soul in exchange for 24 years of service. The devil produces a famulus Christoph Wagner and a poodle Prästigiar to accompany Faust in his adventure. Faust goes on to live a life of pleasures. In Leipzig, he rides out of Auerbachs Keller on a barrel. In Erfurt he taps wine from a table. He visits the Pope in Rome, the Sultan in Constantinople and the Kaiser in Innsbruck. After 16 years, he begins to regret his pact and wants to withdraw, but the devil persuades him to renew it, conjuring up Helen of Troy, with whom Faust sires a son called Justus. As the 24 years come to an end, "Satan, chief of devils" appears and announces Faust's death for the coming night. Faust at a "last supper" scene in Rimlich takes leave of his friends and admonishes them to repentance and piety. At midnight, there is a great noise from Faust's room, and in the morning, its walls and floors are found splattered with blood and brains, with Faust's eyes lying on the floor and his dead body in the courtyard.

16th to 18th century treatments of the Faust legend include:

- Johann Spies: Historia von D. Johann Fausten (1587)
- Das Wagnerbuch von (1593)
- Das Widmann'sche Faustbuch von (1599)
- Dr. Fausts großer und gewaltiger Höllenzwang (Frankfurt 1609)
- Dr. Johannes Faust, Magia naturalis et innaturalis (Passau 1612)
- Das Pfitzer'sche Faustbuch (1674)
- Dr. Fausts großer und gewaltiger Meergeist (Amsterdam 1692)
- Das Wagnerbuch (1714)
- Faustbuch des Christlich Meynenden (1725)

== See also ==
- Deal with the Devil
- Pan Twardowski
- Works based on Faust

== Bibliography ==
- Frank Baron: Dr. Faustus: From History to Legend. München: Fink 1978. ISBN 3-7705-1539-0
- Frank Baron: Faustus on Trial. The Origin of Johann Spies's Historia in an Age of Witch-hunting. Tübingen: Niemeyer 1992. ISBN 3-484-36509-9
- Fritz Brukner, Franz Hadamowsky: Die Wiener Faust-Dichtungen von Stranitzky bis zu Goethes Tod. Vienna 1932.
- Carl Kiesewetter: Faust in der Geschichte und Tradition. Berlin 1921
- Günther Mahal: Faust: Untersuchungen zu einem zeitlosen Thema. Neuried: ars una 1998 (Abdruck der Dokumente über Faust mit Erläuterungen). ISBN 3-89391-306-8
- Günther Mahal: Faust. Die Spuren eines geheimnisvollen Lebens. Reinbek bei Hamburg: Rowohlt 1995. ISBN 3-499-13713-5
- Frank Möbius (Hrsg.): Faust: Annäherung an einen Mythos. Ausstellungskatalog. Göttingen: Wallenstein 1995.
- Phillips, Walter Alison (1911). "Faust" . In Chisholm, Hugh (ed.). Encyclopædia Britannica. Vol. 10 (11th ed.). Cambridge University Press. pp. 210–213.
- Leo Ruickbie: Faustus: The Life and Times of a Renaissance Magician. The History Press 2009. ISBN 978-0-7509-5090-9
- Karl Theens: Geschichte der Faustgestalt vom 16. Jahrhundert bis zur Gegenwart. Meisenheim 1948.
