= Werner Düggelin =

Swiss theatre director (1929–2020)

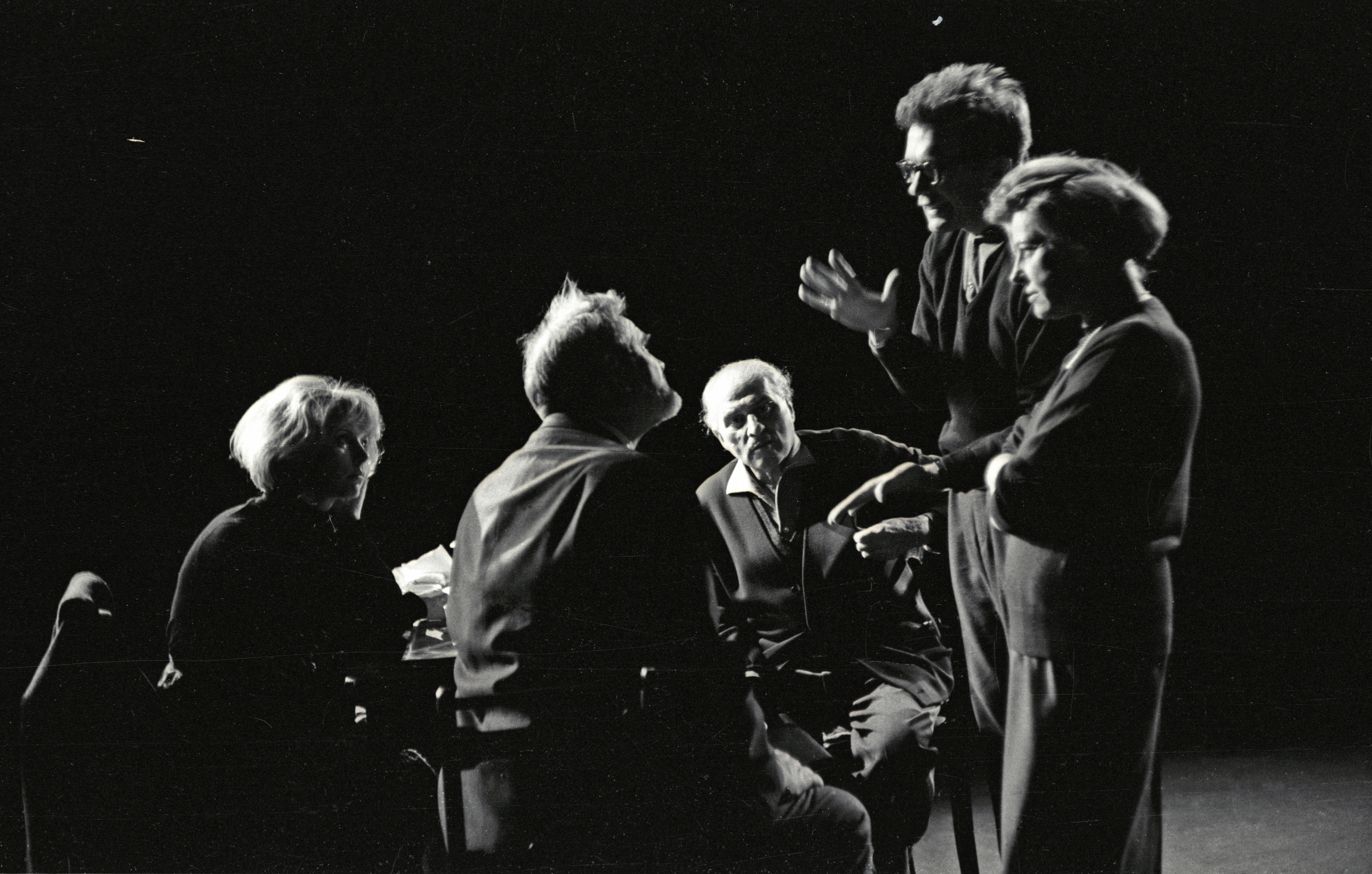
- Werner Düggelin (second from right) 1964 at a rehearsal of "Das Leben des Horace A. W. Tabor" by Carl Zuckmayer (Zuckmayer in the middle)
- Born: 7 December 1929; Zürich, Switzerland
- Died: 6 August 2020 (aged 90); Basel, Switzerland
- Education: University of Zurich
- Occupation: Theatre director
- Parent: Josef Düggelin (father)

Werner Düggelin (7 December 1929 – 6 August 2020) was a Swiss theatre director.

== Life ==
=== Provenance and early years ===
Düggelin was born in Zürich. He grew up in Siebnen in the canton of Schwyz. Slightly unusually for the time, he was born into a family without any stated religious affiliation. The Düggelin family had been established in the socially and politically complicated Outer Schwyz region for several generations. Josef Düggelin, his father, was a cantonal councillor ("Kantonsrat") and, by trade, a joiner. Werner Düggelin attended schools successively in Siebnen, Engelberg, Trogen and Neuchâtel. According to one source he was required to leave both the "Monastery School" in Engelberg and the "Convict School" in Trogen (both subsequently renamed) "early". Spending the final part of his school career in the Francophone west of Switzerland meant that he had to undertake his "Matura" (school finals) in French rather than in one of the dialects of Swiss German which would have been his mother-tongue as a young boy. He moved on to the University of Zurich where between 1947 and 1949 he studied Romance literature and culture ("Romanistics"), "briefly, and without success" (as he himself later recalled). He never completed the course or received a degree. Till he reached the age of around 20, as he much later told Beatrice von Matt, Werner Düggelin had never been inside a theatre. His first visit was to the Zürich Playhouse sitting in a box high up on the right side of the auditorium, he experienced what he described as a "coup de foudre"". He knew at once that the theatre was his vocation, not as an actor but as a director: "I cannot say what it was - it was just crazy." (Note: "Ich kann nicht sagen, was es war - es war einfach irr.")

=== Zürich, Paris ===
He found his way into theatre by working as a lighting assistant at the Zürich Playhouse during the 1948/49 season. It was Leopold Lindtberg, the director at the Playhouse, who recommended that he should progress his career in Paris and helped with the arrangements. During 1949/50 Düggelin worked as a Theater manager at Asnières on the north-western outskirts of the French capital. Starting in 1950 he worked in Paris with the director Roger Blin on a succession of projects: "I was completely devoured by France ... Blin was simply the greatest. [In Blin's theatre I saw] what theatre is".

=== Pioneer ===
Between 1952 and 1963 Düggelin worked as a freelance theatre director in Switzerland and abroad. Back in Zürich he worked with Blin on the German language premiere of "Waiting for Godot"! At the end of 1954 they were ready to present it, which they did on the so-called "Pfauenbühne" ("Peacock Stage") of the Zürich Playhouse. It was Werner Düggelin who had translated the text from Beckett's English language original, and he then worked on it as Blin's production assistant. Unfortunately the good citizens of Zürich were not in a mood for the avant-garde. Ticket sales were "miserable". "The public stayed away".

In the mid-1950s Düggelin started staging his own productions, starting at the "Teater am Central" in Zürich with a successful stage production of a German language stage production of Steinbeck's Of Mice and Men. A career breakthrough came at the Staatstheater in Darmstadt (West Germany) in 1957 with his Darmstadt production of Goethe's Urfaust (the precursor to the better known later version of Faust). It was also at Darmstadt that he directed the German language premiere of Marcel Achard's "Darf ich mitspielen?" ("Might I play with you?"). Staging productions in German of the work of non-German language dramatists has become a theme in Düggelin's career. Along with playwrights already mentioned, Düggelin has been among the first to stage German production of works by Eugène Ionesco, Georges Schehadé, Albert Camus, Jean Genet and Paul Claudel. In 1956 he directed at the Bavarian Staatsschauspiel (theatre) in Munich, where his work included a memorable production of Bidermann's Cenodoxus. Over the next few years he guested as a stage director at some of the most important theatres in the German-speaking world, notably in Basel, Vienna and Stuttgart. He has also, more recently, dabbled in opera. In 1963 he staged Pinkas Braun's German language version of Edward Albee's "Who's Afraid of Virginia Woolf?" at Hamburg. It was also in 1963 that he exchanged his freelance status for a permanent position as stage director at the Zürich Playhouse, still under the overall direction of his mentor and the man who had helped him break into the world of theatre more than ten years earlier, Leopold Lindtberg.

=== Basel ===
In 1968 Werner Düggelin moved to Basel, a more culturally dynamic and diverse city than Zürich, after accepting an appointment as director of the City Theatre. This marked the beginning of what several commentators identify as a golden age for the Basel Theatre. Supported by an exceptional team, he oversaw a succession of engaged and politically tinted productions which caught the spirit of a new generation, provoking commentators and moving audiences to take a more frequent interest in Basel theatre productions.

=== Grand old man ===
- "He is a genius of the encounter, engaging with the actors in spiritual exchange, letting the characters emerge and grow, finding ways to play together. Nevertheless, everything conforms to a strict structure. His artistry rests on this tension between abandonment and uncompromising adherence to form."
- ""Er ist ein Genie der Begegnung, tritt mit den Schauspielern in seelischen Austausch, lässt die Figuren heranwachsen und zum gemeinsamen Spiel finden. Dennoch gehorcht alles der strengen Form. Auf dieser Spannung zwischen Hingabe und kompromissloser Komposition beruht seine Kunst."

Beatrice von Matt, quoted by Karl Wüst

After 1975 Düggelin again worked on a freelance basis, regularly returning to work in Zürich and Basel, but still sometimes stepping further afield. For three years, between 1988 and 1991, he ran the Swiss Cultural Centre in Paris which had been set up in 1985. He is described by Étienne Dumont as the first independent head of the centre. (Note: "Il s'agit du premier directeur autonome.") His predecessor, Otto Ceresa, had been a part-time director who had combined his duties with his principal job as a senior manager at Pro Helvetia. Before that, as initially configured, the centre was run on a collegiate basis by a group of six individuals.

Later productions included Beckett's "Endgame" (1994) and Molière's "The Misanthrope" (1997), both at Zürich. A number of tribute pieces published in celebration of Düggelin's ninetieth birthday made the point that, despite his advanced age, he was still working at the profession he loved, his ear for the dramatists' true intent more acutely tuned than ever.

Though Düggelin was primarily revered as a stage director, completeness requires mention of his television work. Some of his best recalled small-screen adaptations and productions included "L'Histoire du soldat" (1975) by Ramuz, "The Black Spider" (1986) by Gotthelf and a "Hommage to Tinguely" (1989). Swiss artists with whom he worked include Jean Tinguely, Eva Aeppli, Bernhard Luginbühl and Schang Hutter.

== Honours and awards ==
- 1971 Membership German Academy for Performing Arts ("Deutsche Akademie der Darstellenden Künste")
- 1987 Hans-Reinhart-Ring
- 1995 Arts Prize ("Kulturpreis") of the Canton of Basel-Stadt

== Stagings (selection) ==
- 2007: The Importance of Being Earnest – Schauspielhaus Zürich
- 2007: Lieblingsmenschen – Theater Basel
- 2008: Dom Juan – Schauspielhaus Zürich
- 2009: The Just Assassins - Schauspielhaus Zürich
- 2011: The Lesson by Eugène Ionesco - Theater Basel
- 2013: Schönes von Jon Fosse - Schauspielhaus Zürich
- 2014: Le Bourgeois gentilhomme by Molière - Schauspielhaus Zürich

== Sources ==
- Andreas Kotte, ed. (2005). "Werner Düggelin". Theaterlexikon der Schweiz / Dictionnaire du théâtre en Suisse / Dizionario Teatrale Svizzero / Lexicon da teater svizzer [Theater Dictionary of Switzerland]. Vol. 1. Zürich: Chronos. pp. 495–496. ISBN 978-3-0340-0715-3. LCCN 2007423414. OCLC 62309181.
- Hansruedi Lerch: "Düggelin, Werner" in German, French and Italian in the online Historical Dictionary of Switzerland. 2004
