= Mephistopheles =

Demon in German folklore

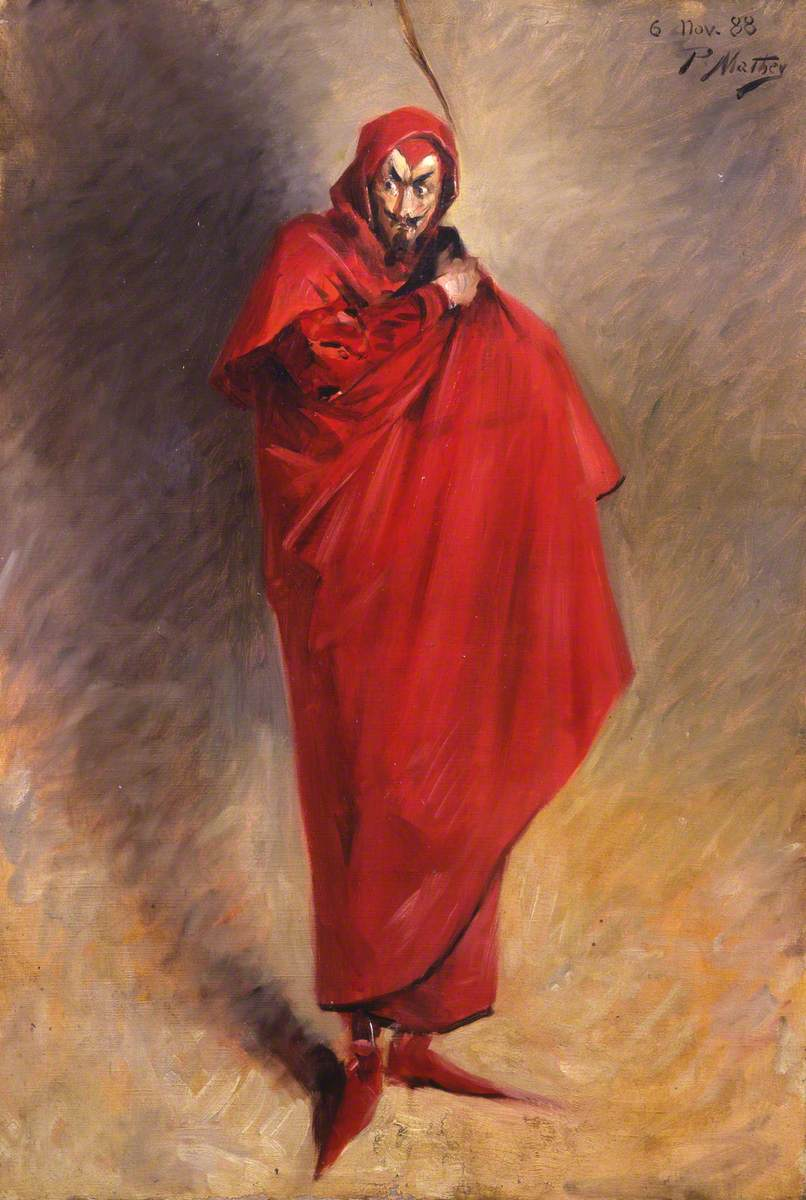
Mephistopheles by Paul Mathey, 1888

Mephistopheles (Note: Variants of the name include: Mephistophilus, Mephostopheles, Mephistophilis, Mephastophilis, Mephastophiles and others) (/ˌmɛfɪˈstɒfɪliːz/ MEF-ist-OF-il-eez, German: [mefɪˈstoːfəlɛs]), also known as Mephostophilis or Mephisto, is a demon featured in German folklore, originating as the chief devil in the Faust legend. He has since become a stock character appearing in other works of arts and popular culture.

== Origins ==
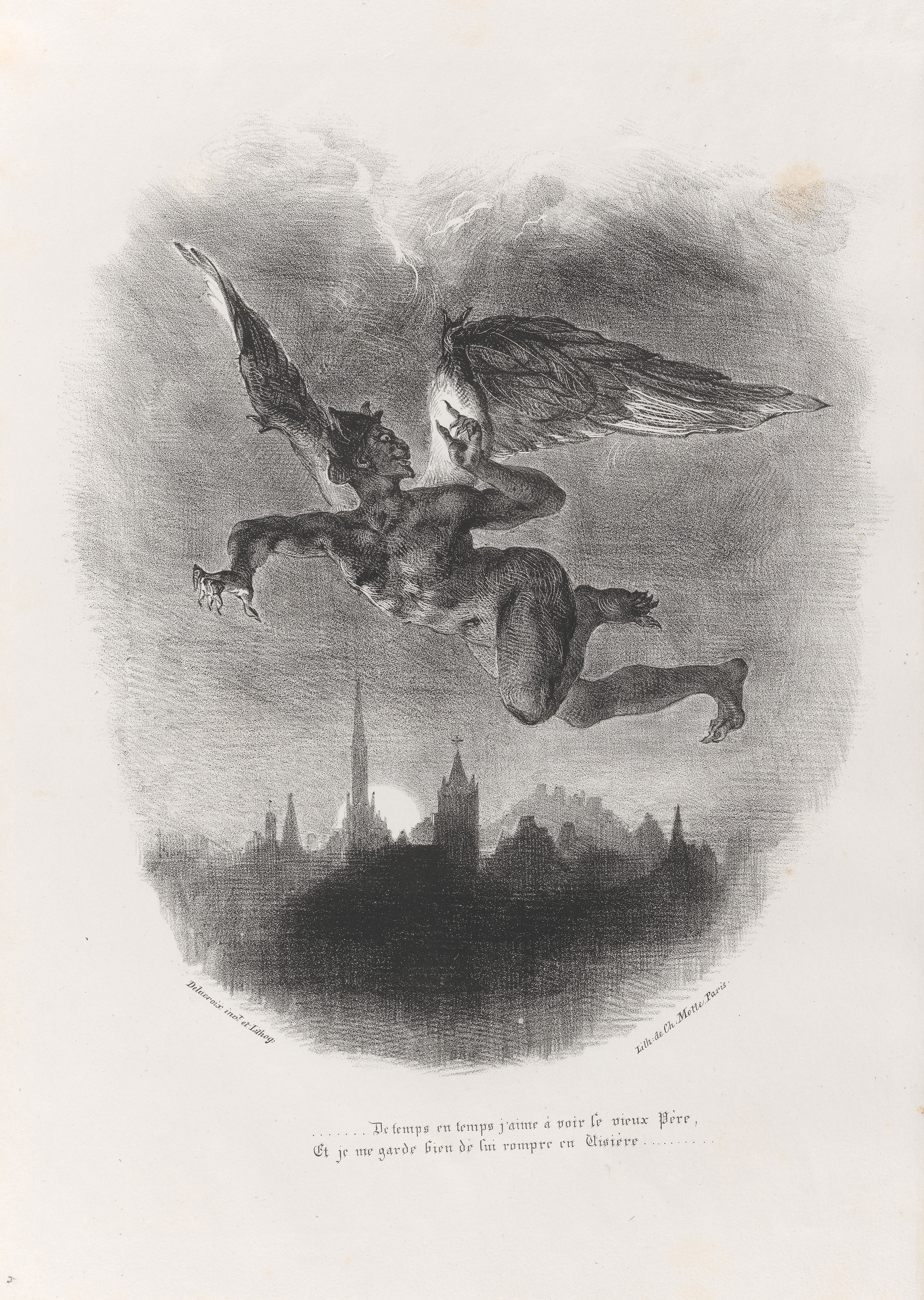
Mephistopheles flying over Wittenberg, in a lithograph by Eugène Delacroix

Around the 15th to 17th centuries in Europe, the age of witchcraft waned, and the Devil became more of a fixture in literature until the later 18th century. Once the idea of Satan's "metaphysical existence" seemed less pressing, he became a symbol in literature representing evil characters, evil meanings, corruption, etc. Sometimes, authors had a more sympathetic depiction of Satan, which would later be called the Romantic Devil. Those who believed in pantheistic mysticism— the belief that an individual experiences a mystical union with the divine, believing that God and the universe are one—often held that the angels fell from Heaven because they loved beauty and wanted to have Heaven for themselves. This idea led to the work Faust by Johann Wolfgang von Goethe (1749–1832), in which Goethe created his version of the Devil, Mephistopheles. Goethe's Mephistopheles has been highly influential.

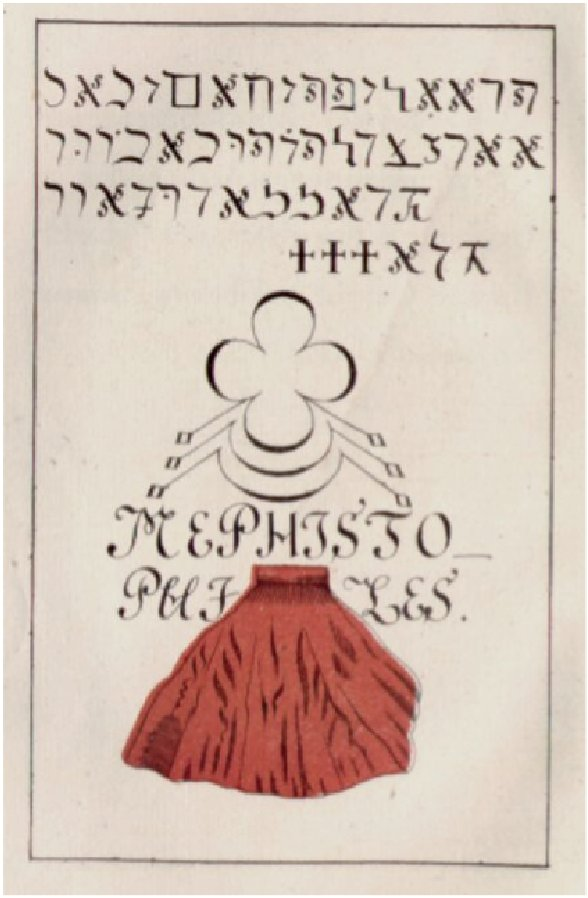
MEPHISTO_PHILES in the 1527 Praxis Magia Faustiana, attributed to Faust

=== Devil vs. Mephistopheles ===
The Enlightenment and Romantic eras in Europe increased the variety of views of the Devil. The Devil, also known as Satan or Lucifer, is understood to be the chief adversary of God. He is the leader of the fallen angels and the chief source of evil and temptation. The Devil is the ruler of Hell and is the prince of evil spirits. In the Christian tradition, the Devil is a creation who was subject to the divine will and who misused the divine nature.

Mephistopheles is seen as Hell's messenger, making him the servant of the Devil. In the Faust legend, he plays the roles of trickster, liar, cheater, and negotiator, making deals for souls, although he can also be intelligent, ironic, and charming. Mephistopheles can shapeshift into any animal, person, knight, etc., through magic and illusion. He is the opponent of beauty and freedom, and he causes the death of the individuals and works to ruin lives.

==== Etymology and name meaning ====
The name Mephistopheles is a corrupted Greek compound. The Greek particle of negation (μή, mē) and the Greek word for "love" or "loving" (φίλος, philos) are the first and last terms of the compound, but the middle term is more doubtful.

Three possible meanings have been proposed, and three different etymologies have been offered:

- "not loving light" or "not a friend of light"(φῶς, phōs; the old form of the name being Mephostopheles)
- "not loving Faust" or "not a friend of Faust"
- mephitic, pertaining to poisonous vapors arising from pools, caverns, and springs.

The name was invented for the historical alchemist Johann Georg Faust by the anonymous author of the first Faustbuch (published 1587). However, in the Faustbuch he was called Mephostophiles, the name Mephistopheles was coined and popularised by Goethe. In The Merry Wives of Windsor (Act 1, Scene 1), Shakespeare used the name in the form of “Mephostophilus” or "Mephistophilus" (depending on which edition is referenced) as an insult between two characters with one accusing the other being a devil. Shakespeare's spelling uses the Latin version philus instead of the Greek philês.

Mephistopheles became a part of magical or demonological lore through a Rennaissance humanist interpretation of Greek and Latin classical texts. In the play, Doctor Faustus (1594), created by Christopher Marlowe, Mephistopheles was written more as a fallen angel than as familiar demon. In the drama Faust, written in two parts by J.W. von Goethe, Mephistopheles appears as cold-hearted, humorous, and ironic.

== In the Faust legend ==
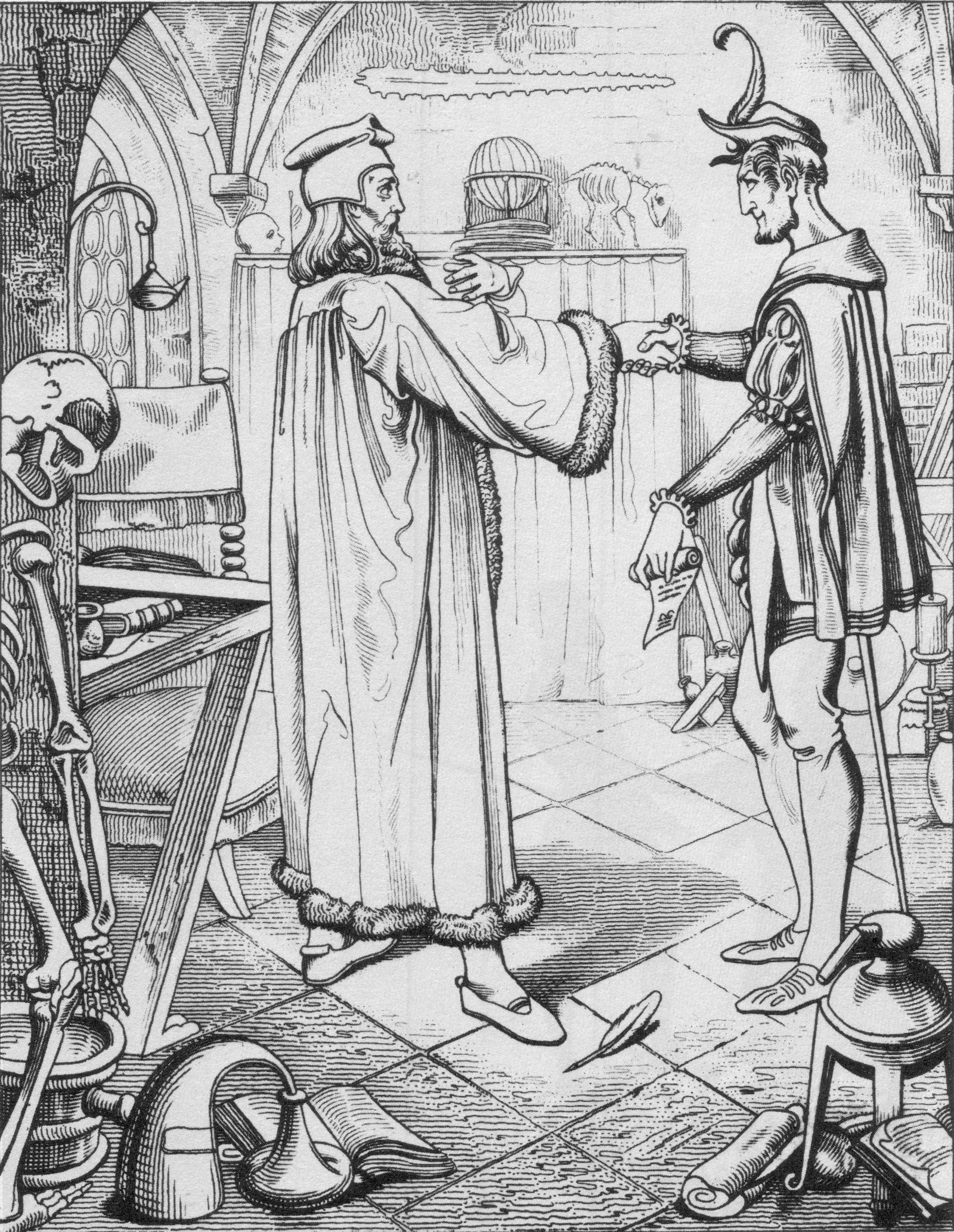
Engraving of Faust's pact with Mephisto, by Adolf Gnauth (circa 1840)

Mephistopheles is associated with the Faust legend, based on the historical Johann Georg Faust. In the legend, Faust, an ambitious scholar, makes a deal with the Devil at the price of his soul, with Mephistopheles acting as the devil's agent. The legend has come to symbolize the consequences of what happens when the quest for empowerment and realization escape the "intellectual and moral restrictions of the Christian medieval order."

In Doctor Faustus, an adaptation of the legend written by Christopher Marlowe, a psychological depth to the traditional view of the devil is added. Mephisto is not completely evil, because he laments the loss of his happiness, being shunned from God. He is introspective and clever and in this depiction very different from the comical ones in medieval times. He is aware of his role and regrets it, because he only perceives illusions instead of God.

The name appears in the late-sixteenth-century Faust chapbooks – stories concerning the life of Johann Georg Faust, written by an anonymous German author. The first of these chapbooks, Historia von D. Johann Fausten (1587) is believed to be the first literary appearance of the Faust and Mephistopheles character. In the 1725 version, which Goethe read, Mephostophiles is a devil in the form of a greyfriar summoned by Faust in a wood outside Wittenberg.

From the chapbooks, the name Mephistophilis entered Faustian literature. Many authors have used it, from Goethe to Christopher Marlowe. In the 1616 edition of Marlowe's The Tragical History of Doctor Faustus, Mephostophiles became Mephistophilis.

In later adaptations of the Faust material, Mephistopheles frequently figures as a title character: in Meyer Lutz's Mephistopheles, or Faust and Marguerite (1855), Arrigo Boito's Mefistofele (1868), Klaus Mann's Mephisto, and Franz Liszt's Mephisto Waltzes. There are also many parallels with the character of Mephistopheles and the character Lord Henry Wotton in The Picture of Dorian Gray by Oscar Wilde.

== Mephistopheles in performance ==
=== Goethe's Faust ===
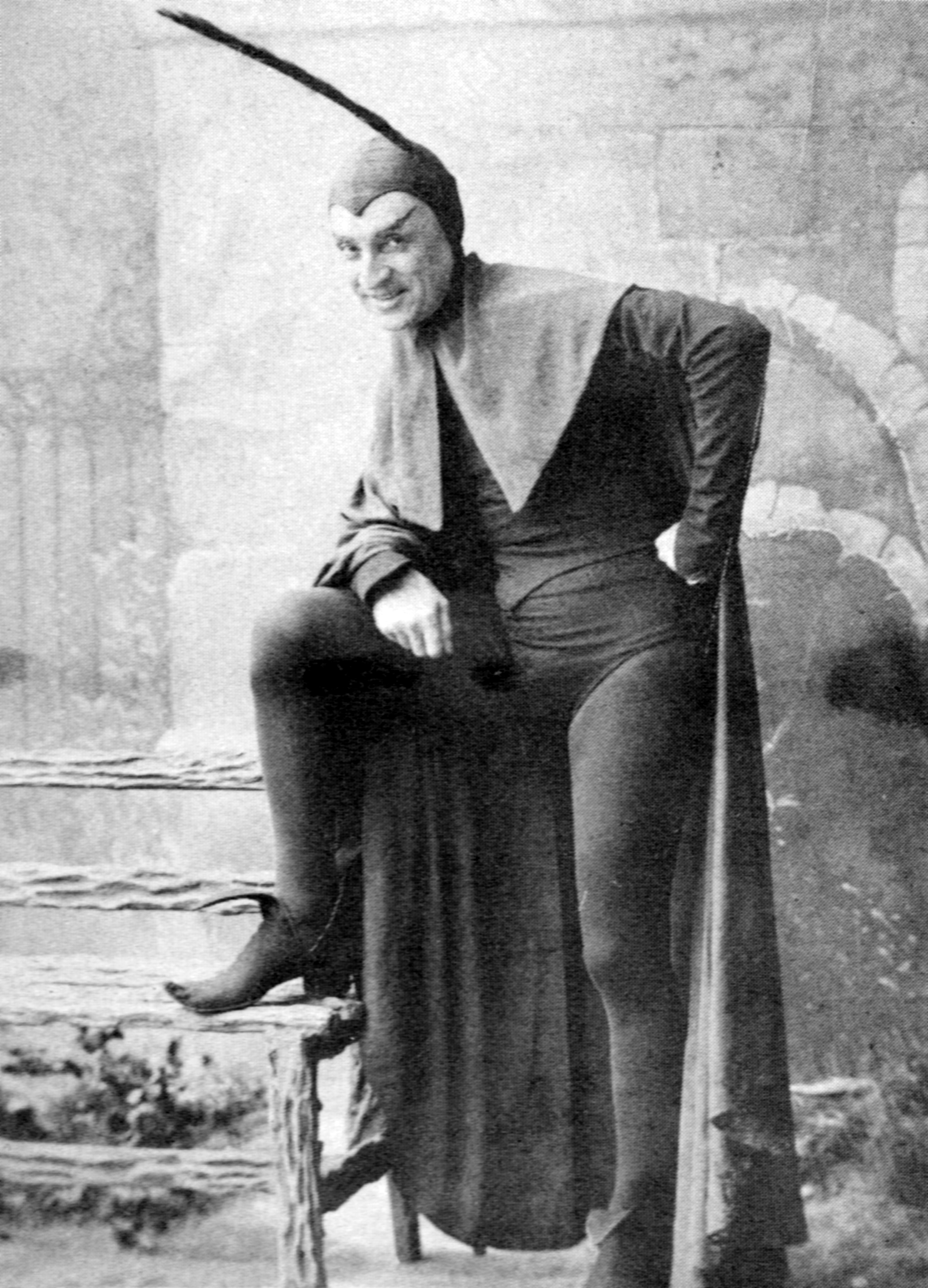
Lewis Morrison as Mephistopheles in his own production of Goethe's Faust

In Goethe's Faust, the role of Mephistopheles is quite complex, and Josef Kainz describes the role as one of the most significant challenges for an actor in world theater. The character constantly changes in tone throughout the play, giving the character a feeling of minor to no consistency in performance on stage. When Mephisto first meets Faust, he describes how his spirit being “Nothing” conflicts with the world’s spirit of “Something” (Part I Scene III, 1362–1366). The devil is in constant conflict with the world he is placed into, which explains the fluctuation of roles Mephisto portrays on the stage or screen. For an actor to play Goethe's Mephisto, they are called upon to embody this “Nothing” and disconnect themselves from the “Something” that makes them earthly. To achieve this characterization, actors are encouraged to be dramatic and rough in tone and gestures, contradicting traditional elements of classical theater.

=== Marlowe's Dr. Faustus ===
In a 2016 Royal Shakespeare Company production of Marlowe's Doctor Faustus, the roles of Dr. Faustus and Mephistopheles alternated between the two actors, Sandy Grierson and Oliver Ryan. While playing both roles, the Scottish actor, Sandy Grierson, expressed that Mephistopheles is more humane than what is portrayed in other plays and novels. The character correlates to the idea of humanity when Mephistopheles pleads with Faustus to reconsider his deal. "O Faustus, leave these frivolous demands" (Act II, Scene 1). Mephistopheles portrays a sense of feeling to prevent Dr. Faustus from making the incorrect decision. Concluding that Mephistopheles is portrayed as less condescending and cold-hearted. Arthur Darvill, while playing as Mephistopheles in the 2011 Shakespeare's Globe Theatre's production of Doctor Faustus, expressed how thrilling his experience was on Shakespeare's Globe Youtube Channel.

== Interpretations ==
=== Devil, damnation, and Hell ===
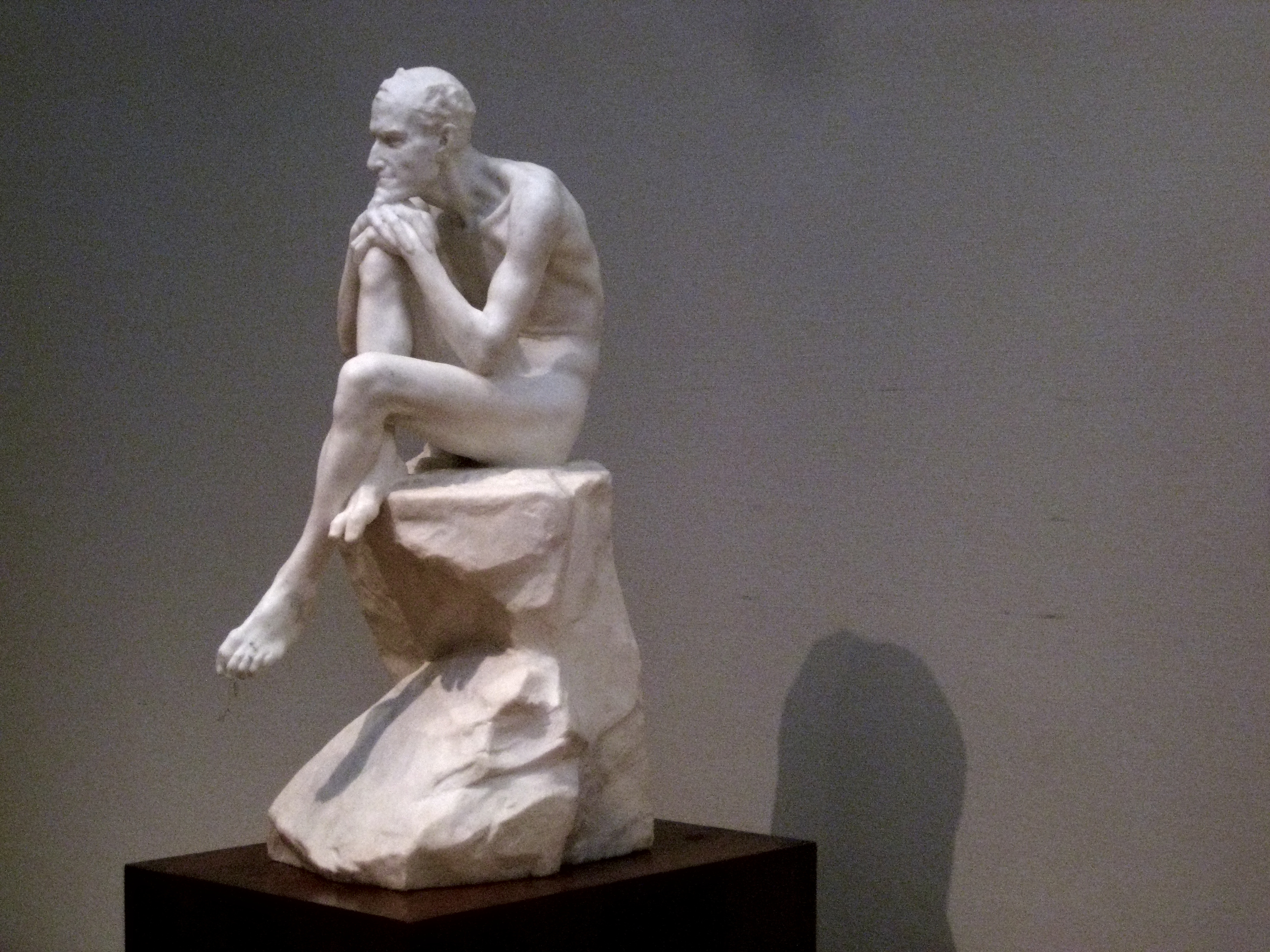
Mephistopheles by Mark Antokolsky, 1884

Although Mephistopheles appears to Faustus as a demon – a worker for Lucifer – critics claim that he does not search for men to corrupt, but comes to serve and ultimately collect the souls of those who are already damned. Willard Farnham explains, "Nor does Mephistophiles first appear to Faustus as a devil who walks up and down on earth to tempt and corrupt any man encountered. He appears because he senses in Faustus' magical summons that Faustus is already corrupt, that indeed he is already 'in danger to be damned'."

Mephistopheles is already trapped in his own Hell by serving the Devil. He warns Faustus of the choice he is making by "selling his soul" to the devil: "Mephistophilis, an agent of Lucifer, appears and at first advises Faust not to forego the promise of heaven to pursue his goals". Farnham adds to his theory, "...[Faustus] enters an ever-present private hell like that of Mephistophiles".

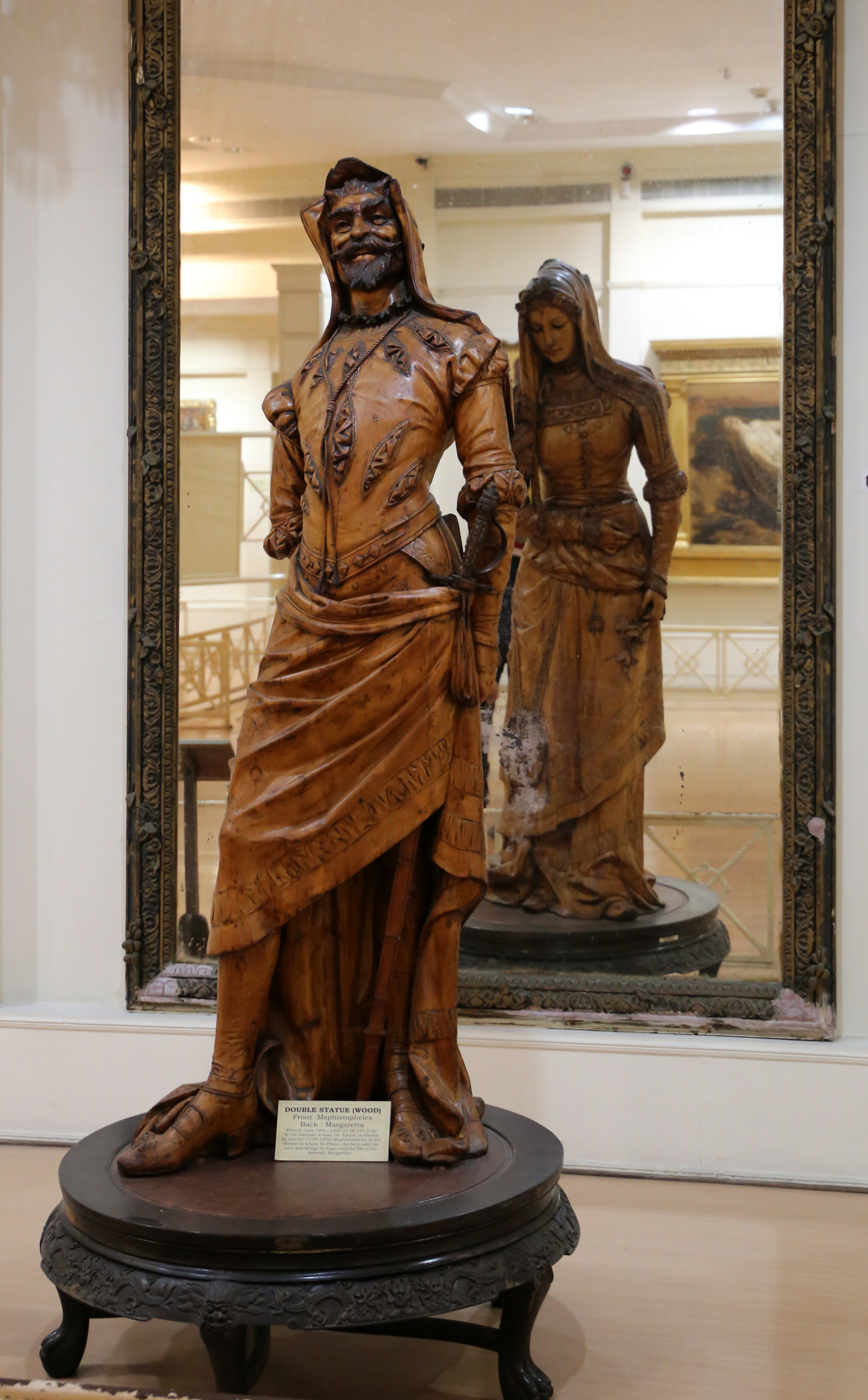
Mephistopheles and Margaretta, wooden double sculpture, c. 1876

Though Mephistopheles can be interpreted as vile through his actions, he profoundly warns Faustus of God’s wrath if he does not repent. Osman Durrani describes the character as “simultaneously, an example of gross depravity and a morally aware theologian.”

Dorothy L. Sayers' play, The Devil to Pay, published in 1939, portrays Mephistopheles as a familiar of the devil as well. Sayers created Mephistopheles to seem mischievous and daunting, while doing the devil's bidding. In this play, it appears as if Mephistopheles' actions were done willingly. Mephistopheles did not necessarily warn Dr. Faustus; rather, he persuaded him to believe that he was to be his servant instead. Once Dr. Faustus was gone, Mephistopheles called into the Hell-Mouth, "Lucifer, Lucifer! The bird is caught..."[Mephistopheles].

This interpretation of Mephistopheles falls in line with the Protestant revisioning of magic, specifically conjuring. In the late 1580s, popular Protestant writers argued that conjurations were "theatrical spectacles", in which Satan allowed demons to appear as if they had been summoned and controlled by humans. This performance further damns the soul of the magician and allows for the demon to collect his soul for Lucifer. These revisions were widely circulated before Marlowe's Dr. Faustus premiered and were integrated into his work.

=== Nature vs. evil ===
The nature between God and evil is complex amongst the theological issues. In Abrahamic religions, God is inherently deemed as good and not capable of being evil, though those religions also have to acknowledge the existence of evil in the world. Through the ideals of the Society of Jesuits, the Roman Catholic religious order expressed that nature is undistorted by original sin. Mephistopheles also appears as a nature spirit, a Naturgeist., though he is still deemed as evil or rather destructive amongst many scholars. However, Jane K. Brown suggests that Mephistopheles is Faust's "mediator to the world," that he is neither evil or destructive. Brown suggests that nature is where God and the devil meet and this is where humans live. Mephistopheles, then, represents one of the two souls that humans naturally possess, Faust's struggle between the "divine principle (mind or spirit) and the world (physical nature)." Mephistopheles is a nature spirit representing the unsegmented world through the human experience.

=== Sexuality ===
One interpretation of the character is that Mephistopheles presents himself as a sexual voyeur. This voyeurism can represent Faust’s sexual confusion and temptation. An example would be Faust’s interactions with Helen of Troy, in which, given temptation, Mephistopheles loosens his grip on Faust as he falls further from God and Heaven.

Mephistopheles can also be perceived as a homoerotic character. When observing male angels during the burial scene in Goethe's Faust, he can be seen as becoming physically aroused. Later on, he becomes consumed by his feelings as he is engulfed in flames. This is believed to be the Lord's plan since the beginning in order to save Faust from damnation. By tempting Mephistopheles's homoerotic nature he is unable to focus on corrupting Faust, subsequently saving him.

== See also ==
- Beelzebub
- In Blue Exorcist, the character Mephistopheles (also named Samael) is the headmaster of True Cross Academy, is also the legal guardian of the Okumura twins.
- Devil in Christianity
- Mephiskapheles, Ska band whose name is a play on Mephistopheles
- Mephisto, a character from Marvel Comics based on the Demon.
- Mephisto, the sole surviving WW1 German A7V tank
- Mr. Mistoffelees, a character from the musical Cats
- Prince of Darkness
- Satan
- Servant, television series
- William Shakespeare mentions "Mephistophilus" in The Merry Wives of Windsor (Act I, Scene I, line 128), and by the 17th century the name became independent of the Faust legend.

== Bibliography ==
- Russell, Jeffrey Burton (1986). Mephistopheles: The Devil in the Modern World (1990 reprint ed.). Ithaca, New York: Cornell. ISBN 978-0-8014-9718-6.
- Goethe, Johann Wolfgang Von (2001). Hamlin, Cyrus (ed.). Faust: A Tragedy; Interpretive Notes, Contexts, Modern Criticism (Norton Critical ed.). New York, New York: W. W. Norton & Company. ISBN 978-0-393-97282-5.
- Ruickbie, Leo (2009). Faustus: The Life and Times of a Renaissance Magician. Stroud, UK: History Press. ISBN 978-0-7509-5090-9.
- Andersson, Love. ““The Devil to Pay” : Temptation and Desire in Christopher Marlowe’s Doctor Faustus.” DIVA, 2021, www.diva-portal.org/smash/record.jsf?pid=diva2%3A1527786&dswid=197
- Smith, Warren D. “The Nature of Evil in “Doctor Faustus.”” The Modern Language Review, vol. 60, no. 2, Apr. 1965, p. 171, https://doi.org/10.2307/3720056
