= Johann Neumann =

Johann Neumann may refer to:

- Johann Neumann (footballer)
- Johann Balthasar Neumann (1687–1753), German architect
- Johann Philipp Neumann (1774–1849), wrote the text for Schubert's Deutsche Messe.
- Johann Georg Neumann (1661–1709), German Lutheran theologian and church historian
