= Historia von D. Johann Fausten =

Historia von D. Johann Fausten may refer to:

- Historia von D. Johann Fausten (chapbook), a 1587 chapbook of stories concerning the life of Johann Georg Faust
- Historia von D. Johann Fausten (opera), a 1995 opera by Alfred Schnittke, based on the book
