= Roundhead (disambiguation) =

A Roundhead was a supporter of the Parliamentarian side during the English Civil War.

Roundhead or round head or variant, may also refer to:

== Places ==
- Roundhead Township, Hardin County, Ohio, U.S.
  - Roundhead, Ohio, USA; an unincorporated community
- Roundhead, a peak near Fredericksburg, Texas, U.S.
- Roundhead Butte, a peak in the Buffalo Plateau of southern Montana, U.S.
- Round Head Mountain, a peak in Lausanne Township, Pennsylvania, U.S.
- Roundhead Mountain, a peak near Stanley, Virginia, U.S.

== Arts and entertainment ==
- Round Head Period, a period of Saharan neolithic art
- The Roundheads, a Doctor Who novel
- Roundhead Studios, a New Zealand-based music and sound recording studio owned by Neil Finn
- Round Heads, a fictional group in the 1936 play Round Heads and Pointed Heads

== Biology ==
- Longfin, also known as Roundhead, a family of fish
- Roundhead galaxias (Galaxias anomalus), a species of galaxiid fish
- Roundhead, a common name occasionally used for mushrooms of the genus Stropharia

== Other uses ==
- Roundhead (weapon), a type of mace used during the English Civil War
- Roundhead (Wyandot) (c. 1760–1813), a Native American chief of the Wyandot tribe who fought in the War of 1812
- The Round-Heads, an ethnic stereotype referring to the Atikamekw
