= Johann Spies =

German printer (c. 1540–1623)

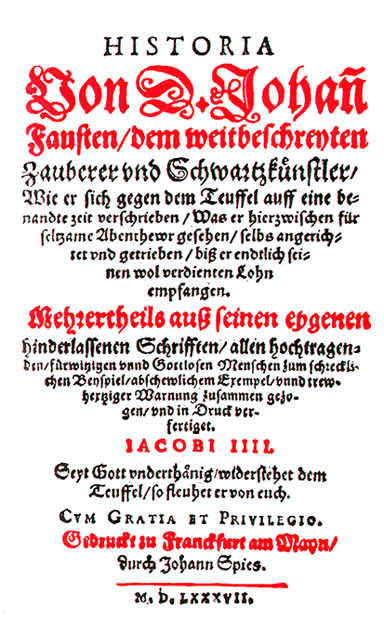
Title page of the Faustbuch published by Johann Spies.

Johann Spies (ca. 1540-1623) was a German printer who published an anonymous book of tales about a legendary Doctor Faust who made a pact with the Devil. The story became the basis for several notable literary works, including Marlowe's Tragedy of Doctor Faustus and Goethe's Faust.

== Biography ==
Spies came from a printing family and continued its legacy; at least three of his sons went on to become printers.

== Career ==
Spies published the book in 1587 in Frankfurt am Main under the title Historia von D. Johann Fausten. The book is a compendium of anecdotes about a professor of theology and medicine who undertakes the study of sorcery, forms an alliance with the Devil (in the form of a friar named Mephistopheles), and undergoes a series of fantastic adventures. In the end, Faust is punished for his sins when Satan torments him and takes his soul to hell.

Within a year the book was translated into English, and by 1611 it had also appeared in French, Dutch, and Czech.
