= Doloris =

Doloris may refer to:

- Castrum doloris is a name for the structure and decorations sheltering or accompanying the catafalque or bier that signify the prestige or high estate of the deceased.
- Lacus Doloris (Latin for "Lake of Sorrow") is a small lunar mare located in the Terra Nivium region at 17.1° N, 9.0° E.
- Salvifici doloris is a 1984 apostolic letter by John Paul II on the Christian meaning of suffering.
- Solamen miseris socios habuisse doloris is a useful Latin literary phrase having conceptual counterparts in other languages.
- Doloris, the stage name of Uika Misumi, a fictional character from BanG Dream!
