= John Wright (bookseller died 1658) =

John Wright (fl. 1602–1658) was a major London publisher and bookseller and one of the two booksellers who sold Shakespeare's Sonnets in 1609. He also was a member of the syndicate that printed the Shakespeare First Folio in 1623. He published several editions of Christopher Marlowe's Doctor Faustus beginning with the second in 1616, was an official printer for the Parliament of England, and published several early newspapers and ballads.

== Career ==
Wright finished his apprenticeship in 1602 and published many notable books, setting up his business at the Kings Head in the Old Bailey. He was the chief publisher of ballads in partnership with Fr. Coles, T. Vere, and W. Gilbertson. In 1609 he and bookseller William Aspley were the vendors of Shakespeare's sonnets, and seven of the 13 extant copies bear Wright's imprint.

His publication of a book against the Parliament in 1643 caused him to be committed to the Compter, but by the next month he had become one of the official printers for the body.

On 11 May 1643, he started a news-sheet called Mercurius Civicus with Thomas Bates, which ran until the end of 1646. Each issue included a woodcut or two on the first page illustrate some event. Wright and Bates were also published The True Informer, another news-sheet.

== Family and death ==
Wright married Katherine, the daughter of Christopher Hatfield, citizen and cutler of London, and is mentioned in his will. They had a son, John Wright Jr. Wright died in May 1658 and was buried on the 11th of that month.

== John Wright Jr. ==
John Wright Jr., became his father's partner beginning in 1634 and ran the business after his father's death until 1667. On 13 June 1742 he obtained the rights to 62 publications from Robert Bird and Edward Brewster, including The History of Gargantua, A Book of Riddles, and Robinson's Citharine book. He also continued the ballad printing partnership. He included his address, "dwelling at the upper end of the Old Bayley" on his early imprints, and later "at the Globe in Little Britain".
