= Roundhead (weapon) =

Type of mace used during the English Civil War

A roundhead was a type of mace used during the English Civil War. It is described as having a head about 9 inches (23 cm), a staff 2 yards (1.8 m) long inserted into the head, twelve iron spikes round about, with another spike in the end. In 1643 an article in Mercurius Civicus claimed the weapon was called a roundhead by the Cavaliers because they were to be used to beat the Roundheads into subjection.

== References and notes ==
Attribution:
