= Mercurius Civicus =

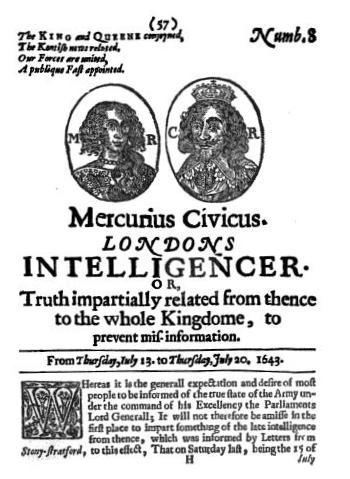
Front cover of Mercius Civius No. 8, 13–20 July 1643.

Mercurius Civicus: Londons Intelligencer, or, Truth impartially related from thence to the whole Kingdome to prevent mis-information (Latin: "The City Mercury") was an English Civil War weekly newspaper, appearing on Thursdays from 4 May 1643 to 10 December 1646 published by John Wright and Thomas Bates. It supported the Roundhead (Parliamentary) cause.

Published in London, each number of the Mercurius Civicus consisted of one quarto sheet folded to make up four leaves, and was priced at one penny. Beginning with the third issue, the front page was usually illustrated with one or two woodcuts, usually of some political or military leader’s portrait (although the same cut was often used for different persons), making it the first illustrated journal. It is regarded as the "first big city newspaper"

== History ==
Parliament passed an ordinance on 14 June 1643 requiring that all news pamphlets be entered into the Stationers Registry, after which Mercurius Civicus suspended publication for a month after the sixth issue appeared on 16 June. It resumed publication a month later on 13 July. Toward the end of that year Wright transferred his interest to his son, John Wright, Jr., after which the imprint appeared as "Thomas Bates and J.W.J." until a few months before publication ceased, when only Bates's name is found.

The author of Mercurius Civicus was identified only by his initials, R. C., but Joseph George Muddiman identified the editor as Richard Collings, which was confirmed by Joseph Frank by the use of rhymed headlines on the title-page and of a hand to indicate important items. Collings also authored The Kingdomes Weekly Intelligencer: sent abroad to prevent mis-information, which appeared on Tuesdays from January 1643 to October 1649, and The Weekly Intelligencer of the Commonwealth, which ran from 23 July 1650 to 25 September 1655 and from May to December 1659.

With the cessation of the Civil War and the partial demobilisation of the Parliamentary Army, many of the newspapers that had sprung up ceased publication. The content of Mercurius Civicus suffered, and it was reduced to reusing the same copy as The Kingdomes Weekly Intelligencer in late 1646. In the 5 November issue, an editorial appeared intimating that the author had been threatened if he continued to publish, and the paper ceased publication a month later.

== Modern transcription and homage ==
In 2013 a British historical publisher transcribed and re-published all issues of Mercurius Civicus from 1643. In 2015 The Lady's Realm resurrected the name Mercurius Civicus as its special supplement on the news of the net.
