= Misery Loves Company =

Misery Loves Company may refer to:

- Misery Loves Co., a Swedish industrial metal duo
- Misery Loves Company (album), a 2000 album by Rosemary's Sons
- "Misery Loves Company" (Porter Wagoner song), 1962
- Misery Loves Company (TV series), an American sitcom
- Misery Loves Kompany, a 2007 album by Tech N9ne
- "Misery Loves Company", a song by Anthrax from State of Euphoria
- "Misery Loves Company", a song by Emilie Autumn from Opheliac
- "Misery Loves Company", a song by Jackyl from Cut the Crap
- "Misery Loves Company", a song by Rebecca Black from Let Her Burn
- "Misery Loves Company", an episode of the series Ruby Gloom
- Misery Loves Company, a podcast hosted by stand-up comedian Kevin Brennan

== See also ==
- Emotional contagion
- Doctor Faustus (play), a 1593 play by Christopher Marlowe which contains the line Solamen miseris socios habuisse doloris, commonly translated from Latin as "Misery loves company"
- Misery Loves Cabernet, 2009 chick lit novel by Kim Gruenenfelder
- Misery Loves Comedy, 2006 album by Louis Logic and J.J. Brown
