= Historia von D. Johann Fausten (chapbook) =

1587 chapbook about Johann Georg Faust

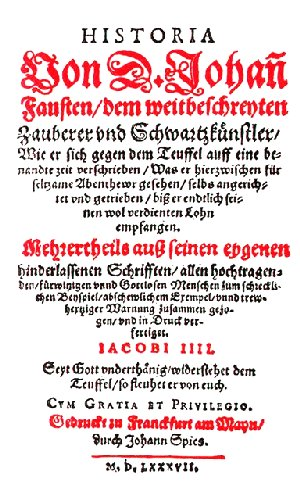
Frontispiece of the Historia von D. Johann Fausten, published in 1587 by Johann Spies

Historia von D. Johann Fausten, the first "Faust book", is a chapbook of stories concerning the life of Johann Georg Faust, written by an anonymous German author. It was published by Johann Spies (1540–1623) in Frankfurt am Main in 1587, and became the main source for the play The Tragical History of Doctor Faustus by Christopher Marlowe and Goethe's closet play Faust, and also served as the libretto of the opera by Alfred Schnittke, also entitled Historia von D. Johann Fausten.

The Faust Book seems to have been written during the latter half of the sixteenth century (1568–81 or shortly thereafter). It comes down to us in manuscript from a professional scribe in Nuremberg and also as a 1587 imprint from the prominent Frankfurt publishing house of Johann Spies.

The better-known version is the Spies imprint of 1587. It came out in September, was reprinted again in the same year and very frequently thereafter, each time with additional tales about Faust, usually old, known folktales with the superimposition of Faust's name. In accord with the theological reputation and clientele of the Spies printing house, their 1587 imprint is also heavily larded with religious commentary. Such "admonitions to the Christian reader" played so well that by the end of the century they had grown to become the major part of the (printed) Faust Books. The general sloppiness and repetitiveness of all these additions, however, seems to have diminished the book's popularity in the long run. As people became less disposed to religious controversy it ceased to be such an attractive book.

An English version based on the Historia was published in 1592, which became known as the "English Faust Book". The Historia may also have been the source of Thomas Roscoe's translation, "History of that Renowned Arch Sorcerer, Doctor J. Faust", published in The German Novelists (1826).

The manuscript version of the Historia was eventually edited by H. G. Haile for the Erich Schmidt Verlag, 1960, and for Carl Winter Verlag, 1996. Haile also published a translation, The History of Dr. Johann Faustus (University of Illinois, 1965).
