= Cenodoxus =

1602 Miracle play by Jacob Bidermann

Cenodoxus is one of several miracle plays by Jacob Bidermann, an early 17th-century German Jesuit and prolific playwright. Jacob Bidermann's treatment of the Legend of the Doctor of Paris is generally regarded as one of the inspirations for Goethe's Faust.

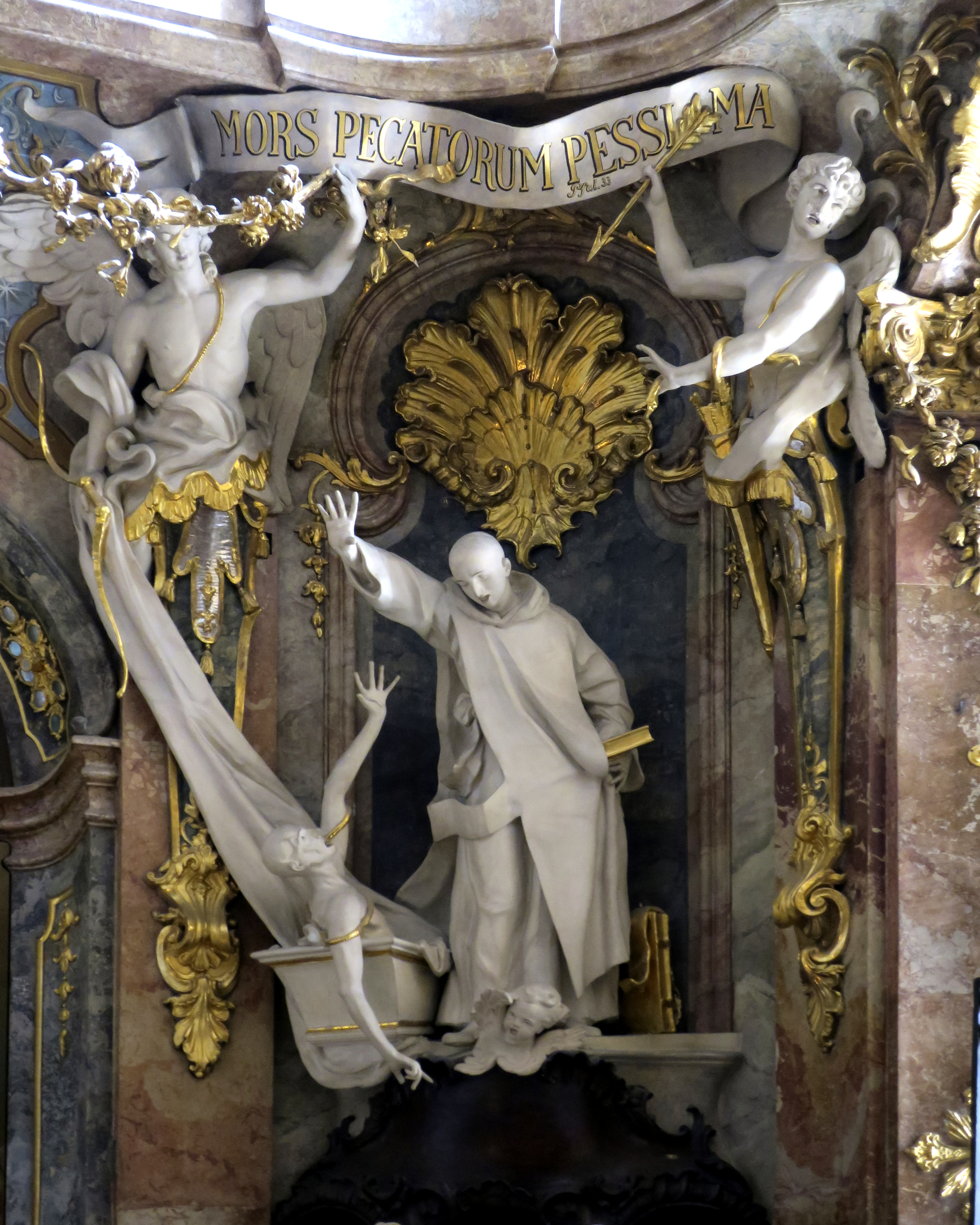
A sculpture of Cenodoxus in Asam Church in Munich.

== Performance history ==
Published in July 1602 at a Jesuit High School in Augsburg, and with earlier handwritten drafts available prior to 1600, Cenodoxus found its first performances by the seminary students there, put on principally for the benefit of the many students residing at the institute. The initial performance in July 1602 was so well received that it was performed a second time the next day.

Far from being inaccessible to the typical theatergoer, the performances of Cenodoxus in Latin were so enthusiastically received that the choice of the language had the effect of making the play one of the hottest hits in Europe. Especially noteworthy performances were recorded in Munich and Lucerne in 1609, after the conclusion of which fourteen young men immediately asked to enter the Jesuit order. The play was also performed with comparable results in Pruntrut in 1615, in Ingolstadt in 1617, in Paris in 1636, and both Ypres and Hildesheim in 1654. Considering all these performances, it is no surprise that there are a fair number of copies of Cenodoxus surviving to this day, but the earliest such copies date back to 1610 or 1611, and are, to this day, preserved as such in a convent in Kelheim. The attention given to this work by the wealthy nobility eventually filtered down to the common people, leading to a German vernacular translation by Joachim Meichel in 1635.

Bidermann's plays were not printed as a single work until 1666, when they were collected under the title of Ludi Theatrales—still in Latin—some 27 years after his death.

As productions go, the performances involved elaborate costumes because each of the Seven Deadly Sins was personified by a student that was appropriately dressed so he could be recognized as such, and an intricate dance sequence involved the deadly sins approaching the dying body of Cenodoxus. Some of the sins approached singly, others in pairs, and each came to the ear of the sleeping Cenodoxus, to whisper into it, and lead him astray, or stir within him a doubt, or magnify in him whatever flaw they could find to foster. This kind of movement, with up to seven personifications of the Seven Deadly Sins, taking the form of devils or demons, each dancing around on a stage that was mocked up to be a bedroom, naturally required a lot of choreographic preparation and rehearsal. It was a fairly complex play.

== Plot summary ==
Cenodoxus (from cenodoxia, "vainglory" or "empty teaching") was a man who had a sterling reputation for healing the sick, helping the poor, speaking kindly, and ministering to all in need. He was equally loved and admired by all.

At a ripe old age, he had succeeded in all the things he had set out to do. He was a teacher, a scholar, a doctor, a lawyer, and a philosopher. He excelled at all the things a man could excel at. But he began to lose his health, and this alarmed all of his friends. When he got sick, friends visited his house to see him, but there was nothing they could do to save him. All they had for him was good words, and wished they could be more like him. People prayed for him day and night. Everybody believed that Cenodoxus was the nicest person they'd ever met.

Mortal intervention from all quarters could not help the good Doctor of Paris, who had helped so many other people. The priest came, but was unable to hear him confess any sins that were not already confessed. The priest left, saying he had done all he could do, "But with the Lord's help, he may yet regain his health." Yet Cenodoxus died, and the mourning began.

=== Last rites ===
When the dead body of Cenodoxus was taken to the cathedral and prepared for its last rites—namely, a blessing in the nature of a viaticum—and it was laid out on the stone table there, it managed to cry out three times in three days, each time prompted by the priest saying his name, and each time leading to an ever-larger crowd of onlookers to witness what was happening.

No sooner had the priest begun to perform his last rites, and started to say "Cenodoxus" than the corpse jolted, opened its mouth, and—moving its dead lips—cried out to interrupt the services. Each time this happened, the priest considered it to be a bad omen, and delayed the man's last rites by an extra day.

- On the 1st day, the Priest said, "Cenodoxus was a good man," and it cried out, "I have been accused."
- On the 2nd day, the Priest said, "Cenodoxus was a good man," and it cried out, "I have been found guilty"
- On the 3rd day, the Priest said, "Cenodoxus was a good man," and it cried out, "Oh, My God, My God, My God, I have been damned to Hell Eternal."

Jacob Bidermann's poetic account of this passage is written in Latin verse, following a perfect iambic meter.

The onlookers witnessing this event were dumbfounded, as they could not think of anything Cenodoxus had done warranting damnation. He was not known for swearing, cheating, or coveting. He was not a gambler, but was in fact so generous with everything he had, that he had nothing when he died. They did not understand why Cenodoxus would have cried out the things that he did.

=== Saint Bruno ===
St. Bruno of Cologne was one of Cenodoxus's many friends, and like all the others there had been in the crowded cathedral when Cenodoxus's body cried out the things described. Seeing this with his own eyes, Bruno was beside himself with confusion as to why these things had happened, and why Cenodoxus—of all people—should have met with such a stern judgment.

"If that good man Cenodoxus is lost, despite the many good things he has done, how can I be saved, who am so much worse a man, and by far the less deserving?"

Bruno concluded that his friend Cenodoxus could only have died guilty of one sin—the Sin of Pride. Pride is something that is hard to detect from merely looking; it is something that only God can detect.

Bruno left society behind to build a monastery in the woods outside of Paris, and he founded an order of monks there, devoutly believing that doing good deeds for others generally tended to magnify pride (or superbia as Bidermann put it)—a kind of haughtiness or vainglory—that is immaterial in the long run, and, as such, being a misplacement of priorities, is a kind of deadly sin that will permanently bar entry into Heaven. The order of monks that St. Bruno founded is called the Carthusians.
