= Johann Georg Neumann =

German Lutheran theologian and church historian

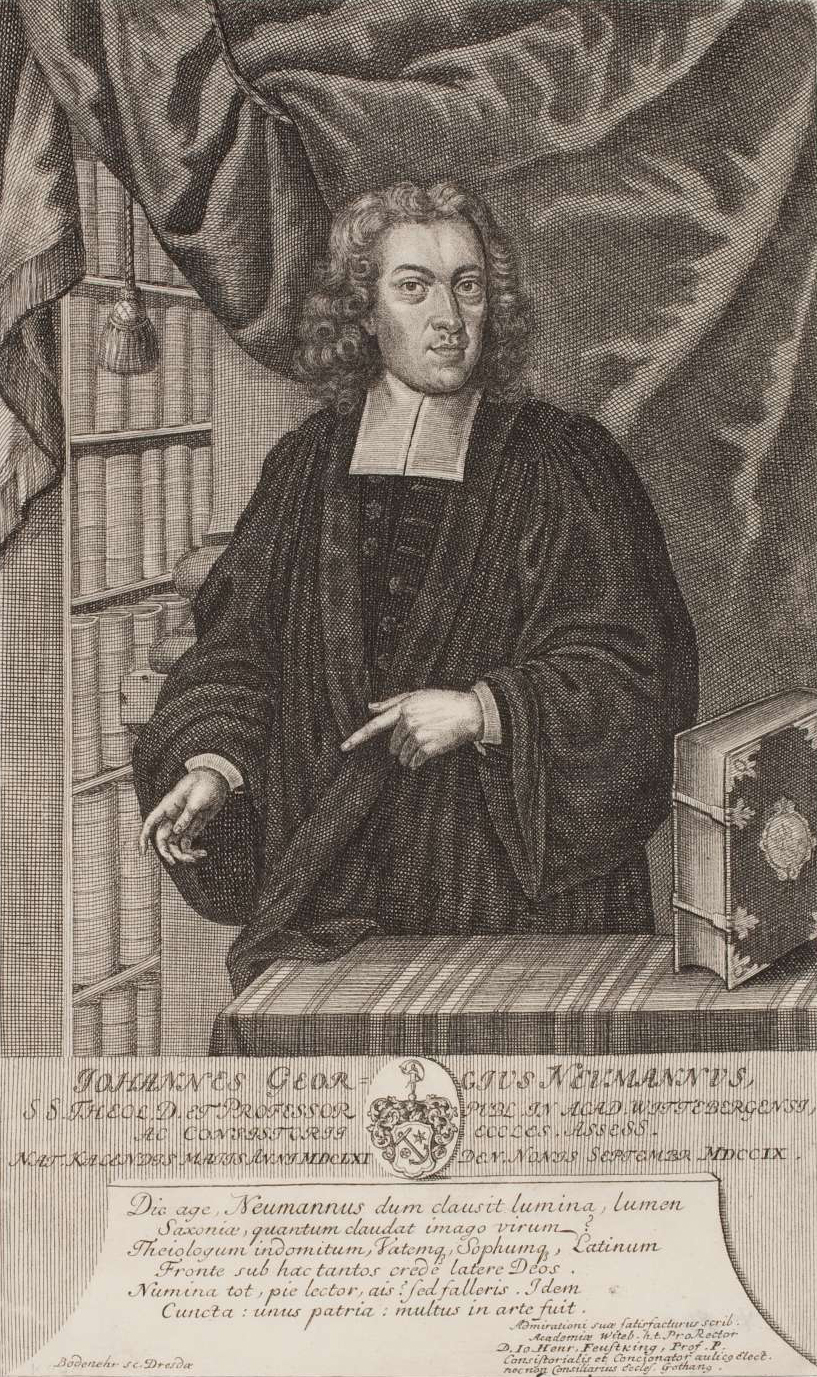
Portrait by Moritz Bodenehr

Johann Georg Neumann (1661–1709) was a German Lutheran theologian and church historian.

Born in Mörz and educated in Zittau, Neuman enrolled in Martin Luther University of Halle-Wittenberg on 15 May 1680, receiving the rank of magister in less than a year, on 25 April 1681 and he became a member of the philosophical faculty in 1684, and full professor for poetics in 1690. Neumann then decided to study theology and began to hold sermons. He received his doctorate in theology in 1692 and became ordinary professor of theology in Wittenberg. Neumann was a pronounced opponent of Pietism and outspoken critic of Philipp Spener.

Neumann was buried in Wittenberg's Schlosskirche, not far from the grave of Martin Luther.
