= Leo Ruickbie =

British historian and sociologist

- Education: King's College, London
- Occupation: Writer
- Years active: 2004–present
- Spouse: Antje Bosselmann-Ruickbie
- Website: https://www.ruickbie.com

Leo Ruickbie is a British historian and sociologist of religion, specializing in, paranormal beliefs, magic, witchcraft and Wicca. He is the author of several books, beginning with Witchcraft Out of the Shadows, a 2004 publication outlining the history of witchcraft from ancient Greece to modern times.

Ruickbie was born in Scotland and took a master's degree in Sociology and Religion at the University of Lancaster. He then studied at King's College London and was an awarded a PhD for his thesis entitled The Re-Enchanters: Theorising Re-Enchantment and Testing for its Presence in Modern Witchcraft. On Samhain 2007 he launched Open Source Wicca, an open-source software project to make the founding texts of Wicca available under a Creative Commons licence. In 2008 and 2009 he exhibited on the subject of witchcraft in France. He is a council member of the Society for Psychical Research

In 2021 he was elected a Fellow of the Royal Historical Society and in 2022 a Fellow of the Royal Anthropological Institute. He is the editor of the Magazine of the Society for Psychical Research.

== Bibliography ==
=== Books ===
==== Witchcraft Out of the Shadows (2004) ====
Witchcraft Out of the Shadows surveys the historical influences of northern European paganism.and describes the roots of modern neopagan witchcraft in groups the Hermetic Order of the Golden Dawn and individuals including Aleister Crowley and Doreen Valiente.

==== The Re-Enchanters (2005) ====
The Re-Enchanters: Theorising Re-Enchantment and Testing for its Presence in Modern Witchcraft is a sociological analysis of modern witchcraft (including Wicca) that builds a theory of re-enchantment using Max Weber's disenchantment hypothesis and then tests this using a sample group drawn primarily from practitioners of modern witchcraft and other forms of contemporary paganism.

==== Open Source Wicca: The Gardnerian Tradition (2007) ====
Original ritual texts of the Wiccan Gardnerian Tradition from 1949 to 1961, released under a Creative Commons Attribution-Share Alike licence similar to that which is used in the open-source software community.

==== Faustus: The Life and Times of a Renaissance Magician (2009) ====
Biography of Faustus (aka Faust) published by The History Press presents new information on the life and death of Faustus. Pagan Dawn magazine said of the book: 'Leo Ruickbie's solid tome does something unexpected. It rehabilitates someone with one of the worst reputations in history; Georgius Sabellicus Faustus Jnr, better known as Faust'.

==== A Brief Guide to the Supernatural (2012) ====
An introduction to supernatural phenomena, beliefs and experiences published by Constable & Robinson.

==== A Brief Guide to Ghost Hunting (2013) ====
A detailed examination of the history and practice of ghost hunting also published by Constable & Robinson. Reviewing the book for the Magonia Review of Books, Peter Rogerson called it 'comprehensive and remarkable good value for the price', adding that 'this is an interesting and useful book one can recommend to ghost hunters and psychical researchers'. It is recommended reading by the chairman of the Ghost Club and Rosemary Ellen Guiley.

The Impossible Zoo: An Encyclopedia of Fabulous Beasts and Mythical Monsters (2016) has been translated into Estonian and is published by Tänapäev.

==== Angels in the Trenches: Spiritualism, Superstition and the Supernatural During the First World War (2018) ====
A narrative history of the First World War examining paranormal beliefs and experiences both on the Home Front and the Frontline. Published by Robinson, an imprint of Little, Brown for the Centenary of the Armistice in November 2018.

== Exhibitions ==
=== La Sorcellerie en France ===
This public exhibition explored the history of witchcraft in France with a special focus on the Ardennes region. In a series of highly illustrated panels it covered topics such as what is witchcraft, where was witchcraft to be found, the Knights Templar, Joan of Arc, Gilles de Rais, the legal and theoretical writers on demonology, famous demonic possession cases, legends of the Ardennes, witch trials in the Ardennes, plants used in witchcraft and stones (precious and semi-precious) used in magic, popular superstitions like the horseshoe and Wicca.

It was held at the following locations:

- 15–29 June 2008, Bureau de Tourisme, Le Colombier, Place du Colombier, Mouzon, Ardennes, Champagne-Ardenne, France.
- 02 - 24 August 2008, Salle des Fêtes, Saint-Antoine, Gers, Midi-Pyrénées, France.
- 21–22 March 2009, Printemps des légendes, Monthermé, Ardennes.
