= Satanic film =

Subgenre of horror film which depicts the Devil and associated wicked themes

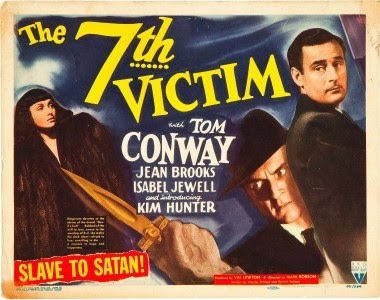
Poster for The Seventh Victim (1943) with tag line "Slave to Satan!"

A Satanic film is a subgenre of horror film, and at times other film genres, that involves the Devil as a concept or a character. Common themes/characters in Satanic film include the Antichrist, demonic possession, exorcism, and witchcraft.

== List of Satanic films ==
=== pre-1960s ===
Title	Director(s)	Actors	Premiere	Country	Notes / Ref.
The Laboratory of Mephistopheles (French: Le Cabinet de Méphistophélès)	Georges Méliès		1897	France	Based on the Faust legend
Faust and Marguerite	Edwin S. Porter		1900	USA	based on the Michel Carré play Faust et Marguerite and the 1859 opera Faust adapted from the play by Charles Gounod.
The Damnation of Faust (French: Faust aux enfers)	Georges Méliès		1903	France	
Faust and Marguerite (French: Damnation du docteur Faust)	Georges Méliès	Georges Méliès	1904	France	
The Student of Prague (German: Der Student von Prag a.k.a. A Bargain with Satan	Stellan Rye	Paul Wegener; John Gottowt; Grete Berger	1913	German Empire	based on "William Wilson" and Faust legend.
Rapsodia satanica	Nino Oxilia	Lyda Borelli	1915	Italy	
Faust (German: Faust – Eine deutsche Volkssage)	F. W. Murnau	Gösta Ekman; Emil Jannings; Camilla Horn	1926	Weimar Republic	
Häxan (Witchcraft Through the Ages)	Benjamin Christensen	Benjamin Christensen; Clara Pontoppidan; Oscar Stribolt	1929	Sweden; Denmark	
The Seventh Victim	Mark Robson	Tom Conway, Jean Brooks, Isabel Jewell	1943	USA	About a young woman who stumbles on an underground cult of devil worshippers.

=== 1960s ===
Title	Director(s)	Actors	Premiere	Country	Notes / Ref.
The Masque of the Red Death	Roger Corman	Vincent Price; Hazel Court; Jane Asher	1964	United Kingdom; United States	Short story by Edgar Allan Poe.
Bedazzled	Stanley Donen	Peter Cook; Dudley Moore; Eleanor Bron	1967	United Kingdom	A comic retelling of the Faust legend.
Black Sunday	Mario Bava	Barbara Steele John Richardson Andrea Checchi Ivo Garrani Arturo Dominici Enrico Oliveri	1960	Italy	
The Devil Rides Out (The Devil's Bride)	Terence Fisher	Christopher Lee; Charles Gray; Niké Arrighi	1968	United Kingdom	Based on the 1934 novel by Dennis Wheatley.
Rosemary's Baby	Roman Polanski	Mia Farrow; John Cassavetes; Ruth Gordon	1968	United States	Based on the 1967 novel by Ira Levin.
The Satanist	Zoltan G. Spencer	Pat Barrington; Mary Bauer	1968	United States	
The Witchmaker	William O. Brown	Anthony Eisley; Thordis Brandt; Alvy Moore	1969	United States	

=== 1970s ===
Title	Director(s)	Actors	Premiere	Country	Notes / Ref.
All the Colors of the Dark (Italian: Tutti i colori del buio)	Sergio Martino	Edwige Fenech, George Hilton, George Rigaud	1972	Italy, Spain	
Alucarda (Spanish: Alucarda, la hija de las tinieblas)	Juan López Moctezuma	Tina Romero, Claudio Brook, Susana Kamini	1977	Mexico	
Asylum of Satan	William Girdler	Charles Kissinger, Nick Jolley, Carla Borelli	1972	United States	
The Bermuda Depths	Tsugunobu Kotani (credited as Tom Kotani)	Leigh McCloskey Carl Weathers Connie Sellecca Julie Woodson Burl Ives Ruth Attaway	1978	Japan/United States	
Beyond the Door	Ovidio G. Assonitis	Juliet Mills Gabriele Lavia Richard Johnson	1974	Italy/United States	
The Blood on Satan's Claw (a.k.a. Satan's Skin)	Piers Haggard	Patrick Wymark, Linda Hayden, Barry Andrews	1971	United Kingdom	
The Brotherhood of Satan	Bernard McEveety	Strother Martin L. Q. Jones Charles Bateman Ahna Capri Charles Robinson Alvy Moore Geri Reischl	1971	United States	
The Burning Hell	Ron Ormond	Jimmy Robbins, Tim Ormond, Robert G. Lee	1974	United States	
Burnt Offerings	Dan Curtis	Oliver Reed Karen Black Bette Davis Lee H. Montgomery Eileen Heckart Burgess Meredith Anthony James	1976	United States	
Daughters of Satan	Hollingsworth Morse	Tom Selleck, Barra Grant, Tani Guthrie	1972	United States	
Devil Dog: The Hound of Hell	Curtis Harrington	Richard Crenna Yvette Mimieux Kim Richards Ike Eisenmann	1978	United States	
The Devil Made Me Do It	Norbert Meisel	Brigette Giursa, Andy Hopkins, Celenthia Monett	1974	United States	
The Devil's Daughter	Jeannot Szwarc	Shelley Winters Belinda Montgomery Robert Foxworth Jonathan Frid	1973	United States	
Devil's Ecstasy	Brandon G. Carter	Cyndee Summers, Tara Blair, Patrick Wright	1977	United States	
The Devil's Rain	Robert Fuest	William Shatner, Ernest Borgnine, Tom Skerritt	1975	Mexico, United States	
Don't Deliver Us from Evil (French: Mais ne nous délivrez pas du mal)	Joël Séria	Jeanne Goupil, Catherine Wagener	1971	France	
The Eerie Midnight Horror Show (a.k.a. Enter the Devil) (Italian: L'Ossessa)	Mario Gariazzo	Stella Carnacina, Chris Avram	1978	Italy	
Equinox	Jack Woods Dennis Muren	Edward Connell Barbara Hewitt Frank Bonner Robin Christopher	1970	United States	
The Exorcist	William Friedkin	Ellen Burstyn, Max von Sydow, Lee J. Cobb	1973	United States	
The Hanging Woman (a.k.a. La orgía de los muertos, Beyond the Living Dead, Return of the Zombies)	José Luis Merino	Stelvio Rosi, Dyanik Zurakowska, Paul Naschy	1973	Spain, Italy	
I Don't Want to Be Born	Peter Sasdy	Joan Collins Ralph Bates Eileen Atkins	1975	British	
Inquisition (Spanish: Inquisición)	Paul Naschy	Paul Naschy, Daniela Giordano, Mónica Randall	1976	Spain	
The Last Step Down (a.k.a. Even Devils Pray)	Lawrence Ramport	Olivia James, Beatrice Stolen, Uschi Digard	1971	United States	
The Legacy	Richard Marquand	Katharine Ross Sam Elliott Roger Daltrey John Standing Margaret Tyzack	1978	United States	
Legacy of Satan	Gerard Damiano	John Francis, Lisa Christian, Paul Barry	1974	United States	
Look What's Happened to Rosemary's Baby	Sam O'Steen	Stephen McHattie, Patty Duke, George Maharis	1976	United States	sequel to Roman Polanski's; 1968 film Rosemary's Baby
Exorcist II: The Heretic	John Boorman	Linda Blair, Richard Burton, Louise Fletcher	1977	United States	
Love Letters of a Portuguese Nun (German: Die Liebesbriefe einer portugesischen Nonne)	Erwin C. Dietrich; Max Dora	Susan Hemingway; William Berger	1977	West Germany; Switzerland	
The Mephisto Waltz	Paul Wendkos	Alan Alda, Jacqueline Bisset, Barbara Parkins	1971	United States	from the novel of the same title by Fred Mustard Stewart
The Omen	Richard Donner	Gregory Peck, Lee Remick, David Warner	1976	United Kingdom; United States	
Race with the Devil	Jack Starrett	Peter Fonda, Warren Oates, Loretta Swit	1975	United States	
Ring of Darkness (Italian: Un'ombra nell'ombra)	Pier Carpi	Valentina Cortese	1979	Italy	
Satan War	Bartell LaRue	Sally Schermerhorn, Jimmy Drankovitch	1979	United States	
Satan's Cheerleaders	Greydon Clark	John Ireland, Yvonne De Carlo, John Carradine	1977	United States	
Satan's School for Girls	David Lowell Rich	Pamela Franklin, Kate Jackson, Lloyd Bochner	1973	United States	
Satan's Slave (a.k.a. Evil Heritage)	Norman J. Warren	Michael Gough, Martin Potter, Candace Glendenning	1976	United Kingdom	
Satan's Triangle	Sutton Roley	Kim Novak Doug McClure Alejandro Rey Ed Lauter Jim Davis	1975	United States	
Satánico pandemonium	Gilberto Martínez Solares	Delia Magaña, Enrique Rocha, Cecilia Pezet	1975	Mexico	
The Sentinel	Michael Winner	Chris Sarandon Cristina Raines Martin Balsam John Carradine Jose Ferrer Ava Gardner Arthur Kennedy Burgess Meredith Sylvia Miles Deborah Raffin Eli Wallach	1977	United States	
Şeytan	Metin Erksan	Cihan Ünal, Erol Amaç, İsmail Hakkı Şen	1974	Turkey	
Shadow of Illusion (Italian: Ombre roventi)	Mario Caiano	William Berger, Daniela Giordano, Krista Nell	1971	Italy	
Something Evil	Steven Spielberg	Darren McGavin Sandy Dennis Ralph Bellamy Jeff Corey	1972	United States	
To the Devil... a Daughter (a.k.a. Child of Satan)	Peter Sykes	Richard Widmark, Christopher Lee, Honor Blackman	1976	United Kingdom, West Germany	
The Touch of Satan	Don Henderson	Michael Berry Emby Mellay Lee Amber Yvonne Winslow Jeanne Gerson Robert Easton	1971	United States	
Twins of Evil	John Hough	Peter Cushing, Dennis Price, Mary Collinson	1971	United Kingdom	
Warlock Moon	Bill Herbert	Laurie Walters, Joe Spano, Edna MacAfee	1973	United States	
Damien – Omen II	Don Taylor; Mike Hodges	William Holden, Lee Grant	1978	United States, United Kingdom	

=== 1980s ===
Title	Director(s)	Actors	Premiere	Country	Notes / Ref.
Omen III: The Final Conflict	Graham Baker	Sam Neill, Lisa Harrow, Rossano Brazzi	1981	United Kingdom, United States	
Oh, God! You Devil	Paul Bogart	George Burns, Ted Wass, Ron Silver	1984	United States	
Angel Heart	Alan Parker	Mickey Rourke, Robert De Niro, Lisa Bonet	1987	United States	
The Believers	John Schlesinger	Martin Sheen, Robert Loggia, Helen Shaver	1987	United States	
Black Candles (Los ritos sexuales del diablo)	José Ramón Larraz	Helga Liné, Vanessa Hidalgo, Jeffrey Healey	1982	Spain	
The Covenant	Walter Grauman	Jane Badler, Kevin Conroy, Judy Parfitt	1985	United States	
Evilspeak	Eric Weston	Clint Howard, R. G. Armstrong, Joseph Cortese	1982	United States	
Family Reunion	Michael Hawes	Mel Novak, Pam Phillips, Jack Starrett	1989	United States	
Fear No Evil	Frank LaLoggia	Stefan Arngrim, Elizabeth Hoffman, Kathleen Rowe McAllen	1981	United States	
The Killing of Satan (Lumaban ka, Satanas)	Efren C. Piñon	Ramon Revilla, Elizabeth Oropesa, George Estregan	1983	Philippines	
Night Train to Terror	Jay Schlossberg-Cohen	John Phillip Law, Cameron Mitchell	1985	United States	
Night Visitor (a.k.a. Never Cry Devil)	Rupert Hitzig	Richard Roundtree, Elliott Gould, Shannon Tweed	1989	United States	
Prime Evil	Roberta Findlay	William Beckwith, Christine Moore, Mavis Harris	1988	United States	
Prince of Darkness	John Carpenter	Donald Pleasence, Victor Wong, Jameson Parker	1987	United States	
Rock 'n' Roll Nightmare	John Fasano	Jon Mikl Thor, Jillian Peri, Teresa Simpson	1987	United States	
Trick or Treat	Charles Martin Smith	Marc Price Tony Fields Gene Simmons Ozzy Osbourne	1986	United States	
The Unholy	Camilo Vila	Ben Cross, Ned Beatty, Hal Holbrook	1988	United States	
Warlock	Steve Miner	Julian Sands Lori Singer Richard E. Grant	1989	United States	

=== 1990s ===
Title	Director(s)	Actors	Premiere	Country	Notes / Ref.
The Exorcist III	Carter DeHaven, James G. Robinson	George C. Scott, Ed Flanders, Jason Miller	1990	United States	third installment in the Exorcist series
Mister Frost	Philippe Setbon	Jeff Goldblum, Kathy Baker	1990	United Kingdom; France	
Omen IV: The Awakening	Jorge Montesi, Dominique Othenin-Girard	Faye Grant, Michael Woods, Asia Vieira	1991	Canada	the fourth installment in The Omen series.
Blood Church (a.k.a. Heartland of Darkness)	Eric Swelstad	Nick Baldasare, Linnea Quigley, Dino Tripodis	1992	United States	
El Sacristan del Diablo	Jorge Luke	Sebastian Ligarde, Jorge Luke, Eva Garbo	1992	Mexico	
The Day of the Beast (Spanish: El día de la Bestia)	Álex de la Iglesia	Álex Angulo, Armando De Razza, Santiago Segura	1995	Spain	
The First Power	Robert Resnikoff	Lou Diamond Phillips Tracy Griffith Jeff Kober Mykel T. Williamson	1990	United States	
The Prophecy	Gregory Widen	Christopher Walken, Elias Koteas, Virginia Madsen	1995	United States	
The Devil's Advocate	Taylor Hackford	Keanu Reeves, Al Pacino, Charlize Theron	1997	United States	based on Andrew Neiderman's novel of the same name.
The Omega Code	Rob Marcarelli	Casper Van Dien, Michael York, Catherine Oxenberg, Michael Ironside	1999	United States, Canada, Israel	a plan by the Antichrist to take over the world.
Sleepy Hollow	Tim Burton	Johnny Depp Christina Ricci Miranda Richardson Michael Gambon Casper Van Dien	1999	United States	
Stigmata	Rupert Wainwright	Patricia Arquette, Gabriel Byrne, Jonathan Pryce	1999	United States	

=== 2000s ===
Title	Director(s)	Actors	Premiere	Country	Notes / Ref.
Bless the Child	Chuck Russell	Kim Basinger, Jimmy Smits, Angela Bettis, Rufus Sewell, Christina Ricci	2000	United States, Germany	based on the novel of the same name by Cathy Cash Spellman
Fever Night aka Band of Satanic Outsiders	Jordan Harris, Andrew Schrader	Peter Tullio, Philip Marlatt, Melanie Rose Wilson	2009	United States	about Satanic manifestations.
Megiddo: The Omega Code 2	Brian Trenchard-Smith	Michael York, Michael Biehn, Diane Venora	2001	United States	follow-up to the 1999 film Omega Code
Rain Rain Come Again	Jayaraj	Ajay Jose, Reji V Nair, Divya Lakshmi	2004	India	first Malayalam film centered on theme of satanism.
The Exorcism of Emily Rose	Scott Derrickson	Laura Linney, Tom Wilkinson	2005	United States	loosely based on the story of Anneliese Michel.
The Ninth Gate	Roman Polanski	Johnny Depp, Lena Olin, Frank Langella	2000	France, Spain	about a rare and ancient book for summoning the Devil
The Omen (a.k.a. The Omen: 666)	John Moore	Julia Stiles, Liev Schreiber, Mia Farrow	2006	United States	remake of the 1976 film of the same name
Semum	Hasan Karacadağ	Ayça İnci; Burak Hakkı; Cem Kurtoğlu; Sefa Zengin; Bahtiyar Engin; Nazlı Ceren Argon; Yıldırım Öcek; Hakan Meriçliler; Levent Sülün; Süha Tok	2008	Turkey	About summoning a servant of Iblis and the role of God and the Devil in secular society

=== 2010s ===
Title	Director(s)	Actors	Premiere	Country	Notes / Ref.
The Blackcoat's Daughter (a.k.a. February)	Oz Perkins	Kiernan Shipka Emma Roberts Lucy Boynton Lauren Holly James Remar	2015	Canada/United States	
Chilling Adventures of Sabrina (TV Series)	Roberto Aguirre-Sacasa	Kiernan Shipka Miranda Otto Lucy Davis Chance Perdomo Michelle Gomez Tati Gabrielle Abigail Cowen Adeline Rudolph	2018	United States	
Devil (a.k.a. The Night Chronicles 1: Devil)	John Erick Dowdle	Chris Messina, Logan Marshall-Green, Geoffrey Arend	2010	United States	
The Last Exorcism	Daniel Stamm	Patrick Fabian, Ashley Bell, Iris Bahr	2010	United States	
The Last Exorcism Part II	Ed Gass-Donnelly	Ashley Bell, Julia Garner, Spencer Treat Clark	2013	United States	
The Devil's Candy	Sean Byrne	Ethan Embry, Shiri Appleby, Pruitt Taylor Vince	2015	United States	
The Rite	Mikael Håfström	Anthony Hopkins, Colin O'Donoghue, Alice Braga	2011	United States, Hungary, Italy, United Kingdom	
The Witch	Robert Eggers	Anya Taylor-Joy, Ralph Ineson, Kate Dickie	2015	United States, Canada	
Starry Eyes	Kevin Kölsch Dennis Widmyer	Alexandra Essoe Amanda Fuller Noah Segan	2014	United States	
Ready or Not	Matt Bettinelli-Olpin, Tyler Gillett	Samara Weaving, Adam Brody, Mark O'Brien	2019	United States	

=== 2020s ===
Title	Director(s)	Actors	Premiere	Country	Notes / Ref.
Longlegs	Oz Perkins	Maika Monroe Nicolas Cage Blair Underwood	2024	United States	
The First Omen	Arkasha Stevenson	Nell Tiger Free, Sônia Braga, Ralph Ineson	2024	United States	Prequel to the 1976 film The Omen, the sixth film in the franchise

== See also ==
- Devil in popular culture
- Satanism
- Satan
- List of horror film antagonists
