= Works based on Faust =

Faust has inspired artistic and cultural works for over four centuries. The following lists cover various media to include items of historic interest, enduring works of high art, and recent representations in popular culture. The entries represent works that a reader has a reasonable chance of encountering rather than a complete catalog.

== Ballets ==
- Faust by Jules Perrot (1848)
- Faust ballets

== Classical music ==
- Ludwig van Beethoven's Opus 75 no 3 (1809) Song – Aus Goethes Faust: "Es war einmal ein König"
- Franz Schubert's Gretchen am Spinnrade (1814) and Der König in Thule (1816)
- Giuseppe Verdi's Perduta ho la pace (1838)
- Richard Wagner's Faust Overture (1840)
- Felix Mendelssohn's Die erste Walpurgisnacht (1843)
- Hector Berlioz's The Damnation of Faust (1845–46) (sometimes performed in staged opera versions)
- Charles-Valentin Alkan's Grande sonate 'Les quatre âges', Op. 33: 2nd Movement "Quasi-Faust" (1847)
- Robert Schumann's Scenes from Goethe's Faust (completed 1853)
- Franz Liszt's Faust Symphony (1854–57), Mephisto Waltzes and Mephisto Polka
- Henryk Wieniawski's Fantaisie brillante on themes from Gounod's Faust, Op. 20. (1865)
- Jean-Delphin Alard's Fantaisie de concert sur Faust, Op. 47 (c. 1868)
- Henri Vieuxtemps's Fantasie sur "Faust" de Ch. Gounod (c. 1869)
- Pablo de Sarasate's "Nouvelle fantaisie sur 'Faust'", Op. 13 (1874)
- Modest Mussorgsky: "Mephistopheles' song of the flea" (1879) is a version of the song that Mephistopheles sings in the tavern scene of Goethe's Faust, pt. 1, also previously set by Beethoven.
- Emilie Mayer's Faust Overture (1880)
- Jean Roger-Ducasse's Au jardin de Marguerite, symphonic poem with chorus (1905)
- Gustav Mahler's Part II of Symphony No. 8 (1906–07)
- Sergei Rachmaninoff's Piano Sonata No.1 (1908)
- Lili Boulanger's Faust et Hélène (1913)
- Havergal Brian's Gothic Symphony (1919–27) and opera Faust
- Julius Röntgen's Aus Goethes Faust (1931)
- Hans Werner Henze's Chor gefangener Trojer (1948)
- Alexander Lokshin's Three Scenes from Goethe's Faust (for soprano and orchestra) (1980)
- Alfred Schnittke's Faust Cantata (1982–83)

=== Operas ===
- Louis Spohr's Faust (1816)
- Louise Bertin's Fausto (1831)
- Hector Berlioz's La Damnation de Faust (1846)
- Charles Gounod's Faust (1859)
- Arrigo Boito's Mefistofele (1868)
- Meyer Lutz's romantic opera Faust and Marguerite and his burlesque Faust up to date (1888)
- Ferruccio Busoni's Doktor Faust (1916–25)
- Sergei Prokofiev's The Fiery Angel (1927; first performed 1954)
- Hermann Reutter's
  - Doktor Johannes Faust, Op. 47 (1936, revised 1955)
  - Don Juan und Faust, Op. 75 (1950)
- Douglas Moore's The Devil and Daniel Webster (1938)
- Gertrude Stein's Doctor Faustus Lights the Lights (1938 libretto)
- Igor Stravinsky's The Rake's Progress (1951)
- Hanns Eisler's Johann Faustus (1952 libretto)
- Havergal Brian's Faust (1955–56)
- Henri Pousseur (music) and Michel Butor (libretto), Votre Faust (1960–68), and related "satellite" works
- Konrad Boehmer's Doktor Faustus (1983), libretto by Hugo Claus
- Alfred Schnittke's Historia von D. Johann Fausten (1994)
- Rudolf Volz's Rock Opera Faust with original lyrics by Goethe (1997)
- John Coolidge Adams' Doctor Atomic (2005)
- Pascal Dusapin's Faustus, the Last Night (2006)

== Comics and animation ==
- Classics Illustrated #167
- Hellblazer, storyline Dangerous Habits
- Ghost Rider
- Faust, a series of graphic novels
- The Adventures of Nero
- Spawn
- Defoe
- Faust, Der Tragödie erster Teil by German artist Flix
- Faust (2021) by Alexander Pavlenko and Jan Krauß
- Felix Faust
- Sebastian Faust
- Treehouse of Horror IV

=== Manga and anime ===
- Osamu Tezuka's Faust (1950)
- Shaman King (1998)
- Fullmetal Alchemist (2001)
- Black Butler (2006)
- Puella Magi Madoka Magica (2011)
- Frau Faust (2014)
- Black Clover (2015)

== Popular music ==
- A broadside ballad, probably based on the 1592 pamphlet by P.F., is the earliest surviving English-language musical treatment of the Faust story.
- Blues guitarist Tommy Johnson claimed to have sold his soul to the devil in exchange for guitar mastery. Tommy Johnson's claim precedes that of Robert Johnson's.
- Blues guitarist Robert Johnson fancifully said to have acquired his playing skill from the devil at a deserted crossroads. Songs such as "Cross Road Blues" (1936) and "Me and the Devil Blues" (1937) allude to his pact with the devil.
- Faun's song "König von Thule" is a cover of Gretchen's song in the first part of Goethe's Faust (lines 2759-82). Goethe wrote this particular song in 1774.
- Poet JB Goodenough's "Children of Michael" which tells the story of a man named Michael who makes a deal with the year (the devil or fate), to have many children but the year has to "choose one for himself". The story features a chorus throughout, and was recorded by Irish folk singer Tommy Makem on his album Ancient Pulsing.
- The Band's "Daniel and the Sacred Harp" (from the album Stage Fright, 1970)
- Queen's "Bohemian Rhapsody" (from the album A Night at the Opera, 1975)
- Frank Zappa's "Titties & Beer" (from the album Zappa in New York, 1977)
- The Charlie Daniels Band's "The Devil Went Down to Georgia" (from the album Million Mile Reflections, 1979)
- Blue Öyster Cult's "Burnin' for You" (from the album Fire of Unknown Origin, 1981)
- The Police's "Wrapped Around Your Finger" single (from the album Synchroncity, 1983) refers to Mephistopheles by way of analogy
- Konrad Boehmer Apocalipsis cum figuris (electronic, instrumental, vocal, 1984)
- The Fall's "Dktr Faustus" (from the album Bend Sinister, 1986)
- Sabbat's "A Cautionary Tale" (from the album History of a Time to Come, 1988)
- Randy Newman's Faust (1995)
- Moonspell's "Mephisto" (from the album Irreligious, 1996)
- Akercocke's "Marguerite & Gretchen" (from the album Rape of the Bastard Nazarene, 1999); the band's name is taken from the talking Capuchin monkey in Robert Nye's Faust.
- Current 93's album Faust (2000), based on a story by Count Eric Stenbock
- The Trans-Siberian Orchestra's Beethoven's Last Night (2000)
- Secret Sphere's "Dr. Faustus" (from the album A Time Never Come, 2001)
- Dimmu Borgir's "The Maelstrom Mephisto" (from the album Puritanical Euphoric Misanthropia, 2001)
- Gorillaz' "Faust" (from the album G-Sides, 2001)
- Septic Flesh's "Faust" (from the album Sumerian Daemons, 2003)
- Muse's "The Small Print" (from the album Absolution, 2003; originally titled "Action Faust")
- Kamelot's Epica Saga (Epica, 2003, and The Black Halo, 2005)
- Cradle of Filth's "Absinthe with Faust" (from the album Nymphetamine, 2004)
- Immortal Technique's "Dance With The Devil" (from the album Revolutionary Vol. 1, 2006)
- Konrad Boehmer Doktor Fausti Höllenfahrt (orchestra, 2006)
- Tom Waits's "Lucinda" (from the album Orphans: Brawlers, Bawlers & Bastards, 2006)
- Enigma "Dancing With Mephisto" (from the album A Posteriori, 2006)
- Tenacious D's The Pick of Destiny (2006)
- Little Tragedies' New Faust (2006)
- Switchfoot's "Faust, Midas and Myself" (2006)
- Streetlight Manifesto's "Down, Down, Down to Mephisto's Cafe" (from the album Somewhere in the Between, 2007)
- Radiohead's "Faust Arp" and "Videotape" (from the album In Rainbows, 2007)
- Ihsahn's "Alchemist" (from the album angL, 2008) quotes two passages from Goethe's Faust. The songs "Malediction" and "Elevator" likewise allude to Faustian themes
- Dark Moor's "Faustus" (from the album Autumnal, 2009)
- The Human Abstract's "Faust" (2011)
- Agalloch's Faustian Echoes (2012)
- SicKtanicK's "Faust" (from the album Chapter 3: Awake (The Ministry of Hate), 2012)
- Marilyn Manson's "The Mephistopheles of Los Angeles" (from the album The Pale Emperor, 2015)
- Halsey's "Hold Me Down" (from the album Badlands, 2016) makes a number of sexualized Faustian allusions
- Iron Mask's "Doctor Faust" (from the album Diabolica, 2016)
- Faust is the stage name of black metal musician Bård Eithun.
- Faust, a German Krautrock band
- Ghost's "Call Me Little Sunshine" (From the album Impera, 2022). Mephistophles is the main protagonist of the song, trying to steal "little sunshines" body.
- Nuit Incolore's "Dépassé" (2023)

== Fairy tales ==
- Stingy Jack
- The Tailor Who Sold His Soul to the Devil
- The Little Mermaid
- Wicked John and the Devil (Appalachian folklore)

== Film and television ==
=== Non-English-language films ===
- The Laboratory of Mephistopheles (1897; France)
- The Damnation of Faust (1903; France)
- Faust and Marguerite (1904; France)
- The Student of Prague (1913; Germany)
- Rapsodia satanica (1915; Italy)
- Faust (1926; Germany)
- The Student of Prague (1926; Germany)
- The Legend of Faust (1949; Italy)
- La Main du diable (1943; France)
- Marguerite de la nuit (1955; France)
- Faust (1960; Germany)
- El extraño caso del doctor Fausto (1969; Spanish)
- Mephisto (1981; Hungary)
- Doctor Faustus (1982; West Germany)
- Faust (1994) (1994, coproduction Czech Republic, France, the United Kingdom, the United States, Germany)
- The Master and Margarita (1994) (TV; Russia)
- Faust: Love of the Damned (2000: Spain)
- Fausto 5.0 (2001: Spain)
- Ultraman Nexus (2004-2005: Japan)
- Faust (2011: Russia)
- When the Devil Calls Your Name (2019: South Korea)

=== English-language films ===
- Faust and Marguerite (1900)
- The Devil and Daniel Webster (1941)
- Angel on My Shoulder (1946)
- Alias Nick Beal (1949)
- Up in Smoke (1957)
- Damn Yankees (1958)
- The Little Shop of Horrors (1960)
  - Little Shop of Horrors (1986)
- Bedazzled (1967)
  - Bedazzled (2000)
- Doctor Faustus (1967)
- Seconds (1966)
- Rosemary's Baby (1968)
- Phantom of the Paradise (1974)
- The Omen (1976)
  - Damien: Omen II (1978)
  - Omen III: The Final Conflict (1981)
  - Omen IV: The Awakening (1991)
  - The Omen (2006)
- The Devil and Max Devlin (1981)
- Oh, God! You Devil (1984)
- Crossroads (1986)
- Angel Heart (1987)
- Hellraiser (1987)
- The Witches of Eastwick (1987)
- The Little Mermaid (1989)
  - The Little Mermaid (2023)
- The Devil's Advocate (1997)
- Tenacious D in The Pick of Destiny (2006)
- Shortcut to Happiness (2007)
- The Imaginarium of Doctor Parnassus (2009)
- The Witch (2015)
- American Satan (2017)
- Upgrade (2018)
- The Last Faust (2019)

Television:

- The Twilight Zone Episodes:
  - Escape Clause (1959)
  - Still Valley (1961)
  - Printer's Devil (1963)
  - Of Late I Think of Cliffordville (1963)
  - The Last Night of a Jockey (1963)
  - Dealer's Choice (1985)
  - I of Newton (1985)
  - Time and Teresa Golowitz (1987)
- Dinosaurs:
  - Life in the Faust Lane (1994)
- I Was a Teenage Faust (2002)
- Paradise City (2021)

== Paintings ==
- Faust (1976–1979)

== Plays ==
- Faustbuch, anonymous German (1587), the earliest known Faust work
- Jacob Bidermann's Cenodoxus (1602)
- Christopher Marlowe's The Tragical History of Doctor Faustus (A-text 1604, B-text 1616)
- William Mountfort's The Life and Death of Doctor Faustus, made into a farce (1697)
- John Rich's The Necromancer, or Harlequin Dr. Faustus (1723)
- John Thurmond's Harlequin Doctor Faustus (1723) and The Miser, or Wagner and Abericock (1726)
- Gotthold Lessing's Doktor Faust, mentioned in a contribution to a magazine (1759), but otherwise left unfinished and collected and published posthumously (1784) in its original, incomplete form
- Johann Wolfgang von Goethe's Faust (1806–1832)
- Christian Dietrich Grabbe's Don Juan und Faust (1829)
- Alexander Pushkin's A scene from Faust (1830)
- Nikolaus Lenau's Faust (1836)
- George Sand's Les Sept Cordes de la Lyre (1838)
- Heinrich Heine's Der Doktor Faust. Ein Tanzpoem (1851)
- Dion Boucicault's Faust and Margaret (London, 1854)
- Friedrich Theodor Vischer's Faust. Der Tragödie dritter Teil (Faust: Part Three of the Tragedy, 1862), a parody of Goethe's Faust Part Two
- H. J. Byron's Little Doctor Faust (1877) (a musical burlesque at the Gaiety Theatre)
- W. S. Gilbert's Gretchen, an 1879 play based on Goethe's version of the Faust legend
- Igor Stravinsky's Histoire du soldat (1918), a theatrical piece "to be read, played and danced" with a libretto by C.F. Ramuz
- Anatoly Lunacharsky's Фауст и город (Faust and the City) (1918)
- Michel de Ghelderode's La Mort du Docteur Faust (1925)
- Fernando Pessoa's Fausto Tragédia Subjectiva (Faust Subjective Tragedy)
- Dorothy L. Sayers' The Devil to Pay (1939)
- Paul Valéry's Mon Faust (unfinished 1940)
- Cabin in the Sky (1940)
- Richard Adler and Jerry Ross's Damn Yankees (1955)
- Václav Havel's Temptation (1986)
- Richard Schechner's Faust Gastronome (1994)
- Todd Alcott's Jane Faust (1995)
- George Axelrod's Will Success Spoil Rock Hunter? (1955)
- Little Shop of Horrors, a musical by Howard Ashman and Alan Menken based on The 1960 Film (1982)
- David Ives's Don Juan in Chicago (1995)
- John Jesurun's Faust/How I Rose (1996)
- La Fura dels Baus's Faust: Version 3.0 (1998)
- David Mamet's Faustus (2004)
- Punchdrunk's Faust in Promenade (2006–2007)
- David Davalos' Wittenberg (2008)
- Edgar Brau's Fausto (2009), a play
- David Massingham and Matthew Townend's Plague! The Musical (2008)

== Poetry ==
- George Gordon, Lord Byron's Manfred (1817)
- Estanislao del Campo, Fausto (1866) (in Spanish)
- D. J. Enright's "A Faust Book" (1975)
- Carol Ann Duffy's "Mrs. Faust"
- Charles Baudelaire's "Châtiment De L`Orgueil (Punishment of Pride)" (1857) and "The Generous Gambler" (posthumous 1869)
- Karl Shapiro's "The Progress of Faust"
- J. M. R. Lenz's "Die Hollenrichter" (unfinished)
- Hart Crane's "Of the Marriage of Faustus and Helen"
- Joseph Brodsky's "Two Hours in Reservoir"
- Alexandre Pushkin's "Little Tragedies"

== Prose fiction ==
- Friedrich Maximilian Klinger's Fausts Leben, Thaten und Höllenfahrt (1791)
- Matthew Lewis's The Monk (1796)
- Charles Maturin's Melmoth the Wanderer (1820)
- Pauline Hopkin's Of One Blood (1902)
- Washington Irving's "The Devil and Tom Walker" (1824)
- G. W. M. Reynolds' Faust: A Romance of the Secret Tribunals and Wagner, the Wehr-wolf (both 1847)
- Nathaniel Hawthorne's "Young Goodman Brown" (1835)
- Ivan Turgenev's Faust (1855)
- Charles Baudelaire's The Generous Gambler (1864)
- Louisa May Alcott's A Modern Mephistopheles (1877)
- Samuel Adams Drake's Jonathan Moulton and the Devil (1884)
- Robert Louis Stevenson's The Strange Case of Dr. Jekyll and Mr. Hyde (1886)
- Oscar Wilde's The Picture of Dorian Gray (1891)
- Joaquim Maria Machado de Assis's Quincas Borba (1891)
- Peadar Ua Laoghaire's Séadna (Written in Munster Irish, serialised in the 1890s)
- Marie Corelli's The Sorrows of Satan (1896)
- Alfred Jarry's Exploits and Opinions of Dr. Faustroll, pataphysician (1898)
- Valery Bryusov's The Fiery Angel (1908)
- Gaston Leroux's The Phantom of the Opera (1909–10)
- Mikhail Bulgakov's The Master and Margarita (1929–40)
- Klaus Mann's Mephisto (1936)
- Stephen Vincent Benét's The Devil and Daniel Webster (1937)
- Horace L. Gold and L. Sprague de Camp's None But Lucifer (1939)
- Thomas Mann's Doktor Faustus (1947)
- John Myers Myers's Silverlock (1949)
- Douglass Wallop's The Year the Yankees Lost the Pennant (1954)
- William Gaddis' The Recognitions (1955)
- Mack Reynolds' "Burnt Toast" (1955)
- João Guimarães Rosa's Grande Sertão: Veredas (1956)
- David Ely's Seconds (1963)
- Roger Zelazny's For a Breath I Tarry (1966)
- John Hersey's Too Far to Walk (1966)
- James Blish's Black Easter (1968) and The Day After Judgment (1971)
- Philip K. Dick's Galactic Pot-Healer (1969)
- Walker Percy's Love in the Ruins (1971)
- William Hjortsberg's Falling Angel (1978)
- Robert Nye's Faust (1980)
- Stephen King's Christine (1983)
- John Banville's Mefisto (1986)
- Clive Barker's The Damnation Game (1986)
- Clive Barker's The Hellbound Heart (1986)
- Carl Deuker's On the Devil's Court (1989)
- Nelson DeMille's The Gold Coast (1990)
- Terry Pratchett's ~~Faust~~ Eric (1990)
- Alan Judd's The Devil's Own Work (1991)
- Roger Zelazny and Robert Sheckley's If at Faust You Don't Succeed (1993)
- Kim Newman's The Quorum (1994)
- Tom Holt's Faust Among Equals (1994)
- Sherman Alexie's Reservation Blues (1995)
- Jeanne Kalogridis's The Diaries of the Family Dracul's trilogy (1995, 1996, 1997)
- Michael Swanwick's Jack Faust (1997)
- Howard Waldrop's "Heart Of Whitenesse" (1997)
- Timothy Taylor's Stanley Park (2001)
- Maureen Johnson's Devilish (2006)
- Jonathan L. Howard's Johannes Cabal the Necromancer (2009)
- David Macinnis Gill's Soul Enchilada (2009)
- Haruki Murakami's Colorless Tsukuru Tazaki and His Years of Pilgrimage (2014), Chapter 5 ponders over a Faustian bargain that is in the spirit of Maturin's Melmoth the Wanderer.
- Oliver Pötzsch's The Master's Apprentice (2018)
- V. E. Schwab's The Invisible Life of Addie LaRue (2020)

== Games ==
- Animamundi: Dark Alchemist
- Blood Omen: Legacy of Kain
- Faust (published as "Seven Games of the Soul" in North America)
- GrimGrimoire
- Guilty Gear (series)
- Knights Contract
- Xenogears
- Persona 2
- Shadow of Memories
- The Seventh Guest
- Call of Duty: Infinite Warfare (Willard Wyler is based loosely off of the legend of Faust and Mephistopholes)
- The Witcher 3: Wild Hunt – Hearts of Stone
- Cuphead
- Limbus Company

== See also ==
- Devil in popular culture
