= Dabbe =

Concept in Arabic

The name dabbe means an animal or a creature, often a baby animal in Classical Arabic and a baby camel in a still more specific sense. Its verb form is "debbe" which means "walking with difficulty", often referring to animals and insects. It is also used in reference to people under the effect of alcohol and to their movements. Both the name and the verb has been adopted in time by other languages which shared similar grounds with Arabic (geographically and/or culturally). In Turkish, "deve" is the mainstream word for "camel", although no distinction is made between an adult camel and a baby, "debe-len-(mek)" is "to wallow, to thrash about, to welter, to struggle desperately", and "dev-in- (mek)" is "to move".

Especially in the context of Islamic faith and eschatology, the word " دابة Daabbat or Daabbah >> Dabbe" is used as an abbreviation for " دابة ال ارض Daabbt al Ardh" or "Dabbetu'l Ard" or Dabbet-ul (sometimes Dabbe-t-ul) Arz or Ard.

The word "Dabbe" appears in a number of verses of the Quran, although the Surat an-Naml (the Ants) in its Ayat 82 is the only one that refers to a particular event that will occur toward the Apocalypse: the Beast of the Earth. The following features of "Dabbe" have been suggested on the basis of interpretations of this ayat.

1. The Dabbe is a moving, living thing.
2. The Dabbe is the product of the earth.
3. The Dabbe is a thing or creature that speaks and gives a particular message, which is addressed to all of humankind.

== In film ==
Hasan Karacadağ has made six horror films based on Dabbe.
