= Semum =

- Theatrical poster
- Directed by: Hasan Karacadağ
- Written by: Hasan Karacadağ
- Produced by: Hasan Karacadağ
- Starring: Bigkem Karavus; Burak Özçivit; Kurtulus Sakiragaoglu
- Cinematography: Seyhan Bilir
- Music by: Justin R. Durban
- Production company: J-Plan
- Release date: 8 February 2008
- Running time: 116 minutes
- Country: Turkey
- Language: Turkish
- Budget: $1,200,000 (estimated)
- Box office: $1,827,047

Semum is a 2008 Turkish horror film produced, written and directed by Hasan Karacadağ which reportedly recounts the true story of a woman who lives in İzmir, Turkey.

The story is based on Islamic beliefs about devils (Şeytanlar), who torment their victim. In contrast to Islamic jinn films, the movie focuses on metaphysical evil (Satan or demons) and deals with questions regarding the existence of God in a secular Muslim majority society, instead of social transgressions.

== Plot ==
Twenty-seven-year-old Canan (Ayça İnci) and her husband Volkan (Burak Hakkı) have just moved into a large, new house. Life seems to continue on its routine track in the young couple's new house until one day, when Canan starts feeling that strange things are happening to her although she cannot understand what or why. Canan gradually starts turning into an evil creature as a mysterious and malicious being, called Semum, takes control of her body and actions day after day.

The first part of the movie is about Canan's life being ruined by the mysterious demon. In the second half of the movie, metaphysical questions are discussed from an Islamic perspective, regarding good, evil, God, and the Devil. God is presented by a Hoca, while the demons represent ʿAzāzīl, another name for Satan (Iblīs) in Islamic traditions.

Despite similarities to the Western demon-movie The Exorcist (1973), Hasan Karacadağ claims that his work is an independent work. Although both movies utilize Satan as an element of fear, he based his version on the traditions of Islam.

== Cast ==
- Ayça İnci as Canan Karaca
- Burak Hakkı as Volkan Karaca
- Cem Kurtoğlu as Mikail Hoca
- Sefa Zengin as Raci
- Bahtiyar Engin as Macit
- Nazlı Ceren Argon as Banu
- Yıldırım Öcek as Emlakçı
- Hakan Meriçliler as Profesör Oğuz
- Levent Sülün as Ali
- Süha Tok

== Production ==
Talking about the film in Today's Zaman the director argues that, "he tried to create a model of a Turco-Islamic horror film and that he would make the world recognize this model, of which he sees Semum as the first example." Semum will be compared with The Exorcist and star Ayça İnci will be compared with Linda Blair, the director told Today's Zaman, noting that the Turkish horror films made so far have been far from satisfactory.

=== Filming ===
The film was shot on location in Istanbul, Turkey.

== Release ==
The film opened in 142 screens across Turkey on February 8, 2008 at number 1 in the box office chart with an opening weekend gross of $441,665.

== Reception ==
=== Box office ===
The film was the thirteenth highest grossing Turkish film of 2008 with a total gross of $1,827,047.

=== Reviews ===
Todd Brown, writing for Twitch Film, notes that this film, like the director's previous hit Dabbe, "once again draws on Islamic mythology and demons as its inspiration," but that, "he had a better budget to work with this time and the cinematography is a good bit better while also indulging Turkey's traditional campy edge". "Cinematography and design work is dead solid and I do believe I detect notes of both Death Note and Constantine in the demon and hell effects," he adds.

== See also ==
- List of Islamic films
- 2008 in film
- Turkish films of 2008
