= Dabbe: Curse of the Jinn =

Dabbe 4: The Possession
- Film poster
- Turkish: Dabbe: Cin Çarpması
- Directed by: Hasan Karacadağ
- Written by: Hasan Karacadağ
- Produced by: Hasan Karacadağ, Cemal Okan
- Starring: Irmak Örnek, Cansu Kurgun, Ali Murat Özgen, Elçin Atamgüç, Sultan Köroğlu Kılıç, Sabriye Günüç, Can Tarakçı, Nahide Uçar, Beren Çiftçisoy
- Production companies: J Plan & Toma Studios
- Distributed by: UIP Turkey
- Release date: August 2, 2013
- Running time: 145 minutes
- Country: Turkey
- Language: Turkish

Dabbe: The Possession (Turkish: Dabbe: Cin Çarpması; stylized as D@bbe Cin Çarpması) is a 2013 Turkish horror film directed and written by Hasan Karacadağ. It is the fourth film in the D@bbe series.

== Plot ==
Kübra is a young woman haunted by a jinn right before her wedding; she murders her fiancé on the henna night in front of the entire family. Ebru is a psychiatrist and Kübra's childhood friend. Ebru wants to film the actions of so-called exorcists in an attempt to prove whether djinns exist or not. She takes an exorcist, Faruk, to Kübra's village to see if he can cure her and prove the existence of djinns. They visit a cursed tree at the village entrance and see a strange code, 7175, engraved in the trunk.

Ebru isn't convinced, even after Faruk unearths black, scriptures, and organs under the toilet, meaning that someone purposely cursed Kübra's parents 24 years ago, even before she was born. After another exorcism, everyone assumes that Kübra is healed; however, she tries to kill her aunt that same night. Kübra's injured aunt reveals to Faruk that Kübra's father died on the night of her birth, killed by a djinn named Sare. Faruk contacts a colleague about the 7175 code. He and Ebru decide to visit İlyas, the only villager still residing in the abandoned, cursed village, as he knows about Sare.

İlyas explains that this all is due to a curse placed on the village by Kübra's father and Ebru's father. The two men were greedy and sought the help of djinns to find treasure and become rich. On finding it, they killed the djinn that helped them and buried it but it came back and now wants Kübra's body in revenge. Ebru seemed to have been left alone because her family shifted to İzmir. İlyas knows all this from his wife, who isn't human, but a djinn, with whom he even has a deformed child. He tells Faruk that the only way to lift the curse is to dig up Sare's dead body from under the cursed tree and bury it somewhere else in peace.

Faruk and Ebru do as İlyas had instructed and Kübra seems to become healthy and normal again. That night, Kübra's mother tells Faruk that İlyas called for him. She has Ebru stay with Kübra while Faruk leaves. Ebru discovers a strange spell tucked inside her bra, while Faruk is stopped on his way by a call from his colleague. The colleague reveals that 7175 is an ancient code originating from the Muslim tradition that believes Jesus wasn't killed but instead, saved by Allah. The numbers in Arabic numerals are written as ۷۱۷٥ which, if read in Latin, spell “VIVO”. The word means “I am alive” and is used by djinns to signal that they aren't dead. Faruk instantly realises Sare wasn't killed by Kübra and Ebru's fathers but buried alive; he has just unearthed a live djinn, which has only worsened the curse.

A frightened, injured İlyas arrives, yelling that his wife has been killed by Sare's clan. Back at the house, Ebru sees Kübra possessed completely by Sare. She tries to escape but is made unconscious by Kübra's mother and sister.

İlyas reveals to Faruk that this was all a trap set to lure Ebru back to her village. Sare can be passed from one body to another. Hence, Kübra's mother planned to save her daughter and make Ebru suffer instead for their fathers' misdeeds, angry that Ebru was able to escape the repercussions. As İlyas is killed by Sare's clan, Faruk rushes back to find Kübra's aunt killed by her mother and sister. Panicking, he drives to the cursed tree, where he is attacked and thrown into a well by Kübra's mother and sister, who throw heavy rocks on him. Ebru wakes up in a grave, where Kübra's mother and sister tell her it is her turn now to suffer by Sare. Ebru is buried alive alongside several live snakes; as she suffocates, the screen cuts to black, leaving her fate uncertain.

It is revealed in the credits that Faruk was rescued by the villagers the next morning but the injuries to his head caused him amnesia. Ebru was never found and her family refuses to speak of the incident. Kübra's family escaped the village that night and haven't been found to this day.
