= A Moonlight Serenade =

1903 film by Georges Méliès

- Directed by: Georges Méliès
- Starring: Georges Méliès
- Production company: Star Film Company
- Release date: 1903
- Country: France
- Language: Silent

Au clair de la Lune ou Pierrot malheureux, sold in the United States as A Moonlight Serenade, or the Miser Punished and in Britain as Pierrot and the Moon, is a 1903 French silent trick film by Georges Méliès. It was sold by Méliès's Star Film Company and is numbered 538–539 in its catalogues.

Méliès plays the miser in his film, one of several of his in which the Moon plays a large part. As in his The Astronomer's Dream (1898), A Trip to the Moon (1902), and The Dream of an Opium Fiend (1908), the Moon appears in two personifications: the clownlike face of the Man in the Moon, and the classical Moon goddess Phoebe, in that order.

The character of Pierrot had previously appeared in Méliès's Dislocation Extraordinary (1901), where he was played by André Deed. The Pierrot in A Moonlight Serenade has the same costume and appearance as Deed's version, though the actor is unidentified. The film's special effects were created with stage machinery (including horizontally rolling scenery), an extreme closeup, substitution splices, multiple exposures, and dissolves.
