= American Virgin =

American Virgin may refer to:

- American Virgin (2000 film), a 2000 film starring Mena Suvari
- American Virgin (2009 film), a 2009 comedy film starring Rob Schneider
- American Virgin (comics), a Vertigo comic book series by Steven T. Seagle and Becky Cloonan

== See also ==
- United States Virgin Islands, a group of islands in the Caribbean
- Virgin America, an airline
