= Magi (film) =

- Directed by: Hasan Karacadağ
- Written by: Hasan Karacadağ
- Produced by: Hasan Karacadağ
- Starring: Michael Madsen; Stephen Baldwin; Brianne Davis; Dragan Micanovic; Lucie Pohl; Emine Meyrem; Kenan Ece
- Cinematography: Gabriel Campoy
- Production company: TAFF Pictures
- Distributed by: Mars Dağıtım
- Release date: 29 April 2016
- Running time: 132 minutes
- Country: Turkey
- Language: English
- Box office: $810,229

Magi is a 2016 Turkish horror film directed and written by Hasan Karacadağ, and starring Lucie Pohl, Michael Madsen, Stephen Baldwin and Brianne Davis. The film went on general release across Turkey on 29 April 2016.

== Plot ==
Marla Watkins moved to Istanbul a few years ago. She now teaches English in a local language school. Her sister, Olivia, is a New York-based journalist. When informed about Marla's pregnancy, Olivia travels to Turkey to visit her sister. Marla lives in a fancy neighborhood. She was previously married to an Iranian artist, but the two have recently put an end to their relationship. Marla decided she'd keep the baby and that is when sinister happenings begin to occur.

== Cast ==
- Michael Madsen as Lawrence Irlam
- Stephen Baldwin as Burga
- Brianne Davis as Marla Watkins
- Dragan Micanovic as Deyran
- Lucie Pohl as Olivia Watkins
- Emine Meyrem as Suzan
- Kenan Ece as Emir
