= Blood Runs Cold (film) =

- Directed by: Sonny Laguna
- Written by: Sonny Laguna; David Liljeblad; Tommy Wiklund
- Produced by: David Liljeblad; Tommy Wiklund
- Starring: Hanna Oldenburg; Patrick Saxe; Andreas Rylander; Elin Hugoson; Ralf Beck
- Music by: Samir El Alaoui
- Production company: Stockholm Syndrome Film
- Distributed by: Bloody Disgusting Selects; The Collective
- Release date: December 3, 2011 (United Kingdom)
- Running time: 77 minutes
- Country: Sweden
- Language: English

Blood Runs Cold is a 2011 Swedish slasher film directed by Sonny Laguna, starring Hanna Oldenburg, Patrick Saxe, Andreas Rylander, Elin Hugoson and Ralf Beck.

== Plot ==
When successful artist Winona (Hanna Oldenburg) looks to get away from her stressful life, her manager rents her a house in her hometown. She soon realizes the house is not as empty as she had previously thought and her once relaxing vacation soon becomes a fight for survival.

== Cast ==
- Hanna Oldenburg as Winona
- Patrick Saxe as Rick
- Andreas Rylander as Carl
- Elin Hugoson as Liz
- Ralf Beck as James

== Release ==
The film was released on DVD in the United Kingdom on 3 October 2011. In the United States, the film was released in selected theatres on 22 March 2013, and was released on Cable VOD and for digital download on 26 March. The film was released on DVD in the United States on 2 July.

== Reception ==
Jeremy Blitz of DVD Talk wrote the film a positive review, writing that the film is "a standard "beautiful people in jeopardy" movie, doesn't make a lot of sense, and is fairly close to plotless", it "is a lot of fun, with great gore, decent tension and plenty of scares." Aaron Williams of Dread Central gave the film a score of 3 out of 5, calling it "short, sharp and nasty low budget slasher fun".

Craig McGee of HorrorNews.net wrote the film a mixed review, writing, "I’m very impressed with how it looked for having so little money to throw at it, this much is true and that much good I can indeed say about it so I won’t break out too much harsh sarcasm and trash it to death", but that it "made the cardinal sin of almost consistently boring me with its story, characters, and lack of imagination leading to the BAM abrupt ending."

Ian Sedensky of Culture Crypt gave the film a score of 40 out of 100, writing that the film "is just a frame to showcase a few bloody kills while one maniac chases around interchangeable victims". Rod Lott of the Oklahoma Gazette wrote a negative review of the film, writing that it is "as routine as it is gory".
