= Bloody Disgusting =

American multimedia horror company

- Type: Partnership
- Industry: Online press; Podcast network; Streaming media; Entertainment
- Founded: 2001; 25 years ago
- Founder: Brad Miska; Tom Owen
- Owner: Independent (2001–2007); The Collective (2007–2021); Cineverse (2021–present)
- Subsidiaries: The Bloody Disgusting Podcast; Bloody Disgusting Selects; BloodyDisgusting TV; BloodyFM
- Website: bloody-disgusting.com

Bloody Disgusting is an American independent multi-media company, which began as a horror genre-focused news website specializing in information services that covered various horror media. The company expanded into other media including podcast networking, entertainment, and streaming media.

== History ==
Bloody Disgusting was founded in 2001 by Brad Miska (under the pseudonym "Mr. Disgusting") and Tom Owen. In 2025 Brad Miska left the company, and it is currently run by Tom Owen along with Managing Directors John Squires and Meagan Navarro. By 2007, the site had 1.5 million unique visitors and 20 million page views each month. In September 2007 a minority stake was purchased by The Collective, a Beverly Hills–based management company. In 2011 Bloody Disgusting began distributing and producing films that have gone on to win awards and spawned the successful V/H/S franchise.

In 2011, Bloody Disgusting partnered with The Collective and AMC Entertainment Holdings Inc. to create a distribution company named Bloody Disgusting Selects. The new subsidiary specialized in providing a wider release for independent filmmakers. The company purchased distribution rights from movies that were initially released at film festivals, with locations at AMC Theatres handling exclusive theatrical release. After this, the movies were distributed by the conglomerate through The Collective's partnership with Vivendi Universal and on DVD, Blu-ray and VOD platforms.

In October 2021, Cineverse (then named Cinedigm) purchased Bloody Disgusting from co-owners/co-founders Brad Miska and Tom Owen, business partners Peter Lutrell and Heather Lutrell, and part-owner Michael Green whose company The Collective had previously owned a large stake in the company. Cinedigm intends to expand Bloody Disgusting on a large scale. In October 2021, Cinedigm assigned management of their subsidiary streaming service Screambox, to the Bloody Disgusting team. The collaboration will reinvent the streaming service, with intent to expand its content and original releases. In November 2022, the relaunch of the new "Bloody Disgusting approved" Screambox was announced. The streaming service included a redesign, change in cost, increase in variety of content, and accessibility changes. Upon its launch, the streamer included over 700 available titles. Bloody Disgusting's original streaming service, Bloody Disgusting TV, was moved into Screambox navigation.

== Film production ==
- V/H/S – premiered at the 2012 Sundance Film Festival
- V/H/S/2 – premiered at the 2013 Sundance Film Festival
- V/H/S: Viral – premiered at the 2014 Fantastic Fest film festival
- V/H/S/94 – premiered at the 2021 Fantastic Fest film festival
- V/H/S/99 – premiered at the 2022 Toronto International Film Festival
- Kids vs. Aliens – premiered at the 2022 Fantastic Fest film festival
- V/H/S/85 – premiered at the 2023 Fantastic Fest film festival
- V/H/S/Beyond – premiered at the 2024 Fantastic Fest film festival
- V/H/S/Halloween – premiered at the 2025 Fantastic Fest film festival
- Under the Bed – premiered at the 2012 Fantasia International Film Festival
- A Horrible Way to Die – premiered at the 2010 Toronto International Film Festival. It also played at Fantastic Fest where it received three major awards: Best Screenplay for Simon Barrett, Best Actor for AJ Bowen and Best Actress for Amy Seimetz.
- Southbound – premiered at the 2015 Toronto International Film Festival
- Honeydew – premiered at the 2020 Nightstream Film Festival
- Return to Silent Hill - U.S. distribution only

== Bloody Disgusting Selects ==
- Alyce Kills
- Atrocious
- Blood Runs Cold
- Chop
- Cold Fish
- Crawl
- Delivery
- Exit Humanity
- Faust: Love of the Damned
- Fever Night aka Band of Satanic Outsiders
- The Haunting of Helena
- Hellacious Acres
- Macabre
- Outcast
- The Pack
- Phase 7
- Rammbock
- Truth or Dare
- The Woman
- YellowBrickRoad
- Terrifier 2
- Terrifier 3
