= Dead Water (film) =

- Film poster
- Directed by: Chris Helton
- Written by: Jason Usry
- Produced by: Mark Andrews; Chris Helton; Ritchie G. Piert Sr.
- Starring: Casper Van Dien; Judd Nelson
- Cinematography: Josh Pickering
- Edited by: Brock Bodell; Daniel R. Perry
- Music by: John Avarese
- Production company: Silver Line Films
- Distributed by: Saban Films
- Release date: July 26, 2019 (United States)
- Running time: 92 minutes
- Country: United States
- Language: English

Dead Water is a 2019 American thriller film directed by Chris Helton and starring Casper Van Dien and Judd Nelson.

== Plot ==
Married couple Vivian and David Cooper are talking about their vacation, saying that it will be good for them. David Cooper, who is a retired marine, and his brother's best friend John are at the bar talking about what is going on in David's life. They overhear a few guys insulting his wife who was reporting the news on TV. After fighting the two men, David and John leave the bar. John invites David and his wife on a trip to retrieve his yacht in the Virgin Islands. John mentions to David that he needs to talk to a therapist about what is happening to him but he shrugs it off with no concern and puts his daily dose of pills in the sink. Vivian returns home from work and talks about how John called her about the vacation and suggests that they go. Later that night, David tells Vivian that they can go on the trip. Arriving at the boat, John talks to the couple about touring the boat before they leave the dock.

Suspect at John's advances toward Vivian, David pays attention to John a little closer. They talk about David's brother and the memories. John leaves the couple to go for a smoke and David mentions that John seems off. Things get tense because John continually asks about the war, so John apologizes after David tells him that he doesn't like to talk about it. Vivian goes to find rum in John's room and finds a picture of her and John with David torn off the picture.

John starts to reveal disturbing behavior. While David and John are swimming, there is a man by the name of Jack covering his bleeding eye who watches their boat across the water.

David finds the picture that Vivian found earlier. He suggests that they play Truth or Dare and John ask him how many people he has killed. David suggests that Vivian and John kiss. They both decline. Waking up, David finds John in the command room and is told the boat has stopped working. David decides to go look for help and he runs into Jack. After being shot by Jack, David is laying in the water and Jack heads to John's boat. Back at the boat, John confesses his love for Vivian but she declines his advances. Jack comes to John's boat saying that he can help with a fee given. John agrees.

Vivian continues to call David's phone looking for him and she realizes that Jack has her husband's phone. So Jack takes Vivian inside the yacht and drives off leaving John in Jack's boat. John tells David that Jack killed and took Vivian, so David tries to hotwire the boat and he goes after them.

== Cast ==
- Casper Van Dien as John Livingston
- Judd Nelson as Jack
- Brianne Davis as Vivian Cooper
- Griff Furst as David Cooper
- Chris Helton as producer and director

== Release ==
The film was released in theaters and VOD on July 26, 2019.

== Reception ==
On review aggregator website Rotten Tomatoes, Dead Water has a 17% approval rating based on six reviews, with an average rating of 4.9/10. On Metacritic, the film has a score of 31 out of 100 based on four reviews, indicating "generally unfavorable" reviews.

Joe Leydon of Variety gave the film a negative review and described it as "a tepid VOD-ready melodrama that strikes faint echoes of Roman Polanski's Knife in the Water and Phillip Noyce's Dead Calm while ponderously padding 60 or so minutes of plot to feature length". Frank Scheck of The Hollywood Reporter also gave the film a negative review and wrote, "None of the performers are able to bring life to their schematic characters, although Nelson appears to be having fun as a modern-day pirate".

Conversely, Jake Dee of JoBlo.com gave the film a five out of ten.
