= Brianne Davis =

American actress, producer and director

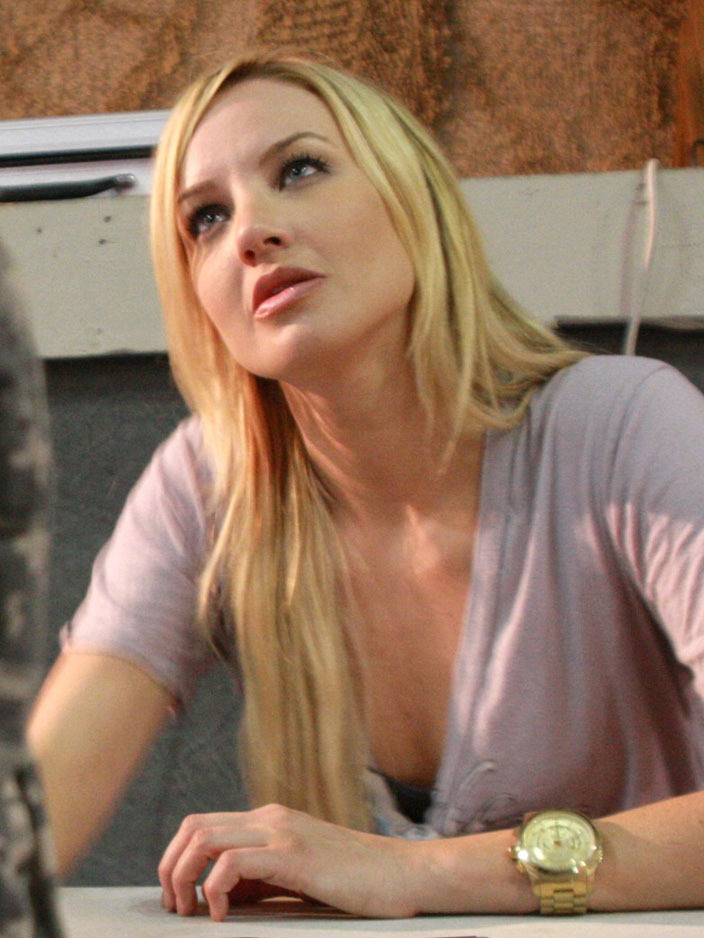
- Davis in 2009
- Born: Atlanta, Georgia, U.S.
- Occupations: Actress; model; producer; director
- Years active: 2001–present
- Website: www.briannedavis.com

Brianne Davis is an American actress, producer and director, known for her roles in films Jarhead (2005), Prom Night (2008), and American Virgin (2009).

== Life and career ==
Davis was born and raised in Atlanta and moved to Los Angeles in the early-1990s. She made her television debut with small part on the episode of Dawson's Creek in 2001, and in 2005 appeared in film Jarhead as Jake Gyllenhaal's character's girlfriend. In 2008, Davis co-starred in the slasher film Prom Night, and later appeared in American Virgin.

On television, Davis has guest-starred in Nip/Tuck, CSI: Crime Scene Investigation, Entourage, Desperate Housewives, Brothers & Sisters, Body of Proof, and True Blood, as well as appeared in recurring roles on Hollywood Heights, Murder in the First, True Blood, and If Loving You Is Wrong She continued appearing in low-profile horror films, like The Victim, ChromeSkull: Laid to Rest 2, and The Night Visitor. She also directed horror films The Night Visitor 2: Heather's Story and Psychophonia in 2014.

In 2016, Davis was cast as lead alongside Barry Sloane, Walton Goggins and Nadine Velazquez in the History Channel drama series Six created by William Broyles, Jr.

== Filmography ==
=== Film ===
| Year | Title | Role | Notes |
|---|---|---|---|
| 2005 | Promtroversy | Tiff'ny Whitney | Short |
| 2005 | Crash Landing | Rochelle Davis | |
| 2005 | Jarhead | Kristina | |
| 2005 | The Kid & I | Marla | |
| 2006 | Swedish Auto | Ann | |
| 2007 | The Haunting of Marsten Manor | Jill | |
| 2007 | The Masquerade | Mary | Short |
| 2008 | Prom Night | Crissy Lynn | |
| 2008 | Something's Wrong in Kansas | Jessica | |
| 2009 | American Virgin | Natalie 'Naz' Stevens | |
| 2010 | The Bannen Way | Bombshell | |
| 2011 | Ham Sandwich | Megan | Short |
| 2011 | The Victim | Missing Girl | |
| 2011 | ChromeSkull: Laid to Rest 2 | Mrs. Cromeans | |
| 2012 | Among Friends | Jules | |
| 2013 | Breaking at the Edge | Lorena | |
| 2013 | The Night Visitor | Jen | |
| 2015 | Synchronicity | Abby | |
| 2015 | Quit | Shannon | Short |
| 2016 | Magi | Marla Watkins | |
| 2016 | The Night Visitor 2: Heather's Story | Jen | |
| 2019 | Dead Water | Vivian Cooper | |
| 202? | Transfer | Sami | Short, pre-production |

=== Television ===
| Year | Title | Role | Notes |
|---|---|---|---|
| 2001 | Dawson's Creek | Ashley | "The Bostonians" |
| 2006 | Nip/Tuck | Riley White | "Cindy Plumb" |
| 2006 | CSI: Crime Scene Investigation | Annie | "Built to Kill: Part 2" |
| 2007 | Veronica Mars | Wendy | "Poughkeepsie, Tramps and Thieves" |
| 2007 | Entourage | Allyson | "Dog Day Afternoon" |
| 2007 | CSI: Miami | Miranda Harton | "Cyber-Levity" |
| 2007 | I'm with Stupid | Debbie | TV film |
| 2008 | Cold Case | Lindsay Port | "Spiders" |
| 2008 | Life | Erika Hutton | "Black Friday" |
| 2010 | Desperate Housewives | Jennifer Morelli | "You Gotta Get a Gimmick" |
| 2010 | Brothers & Sisters | Vanessa | "Call Mom" |
| 2011 | Bri Squared | Bri | TV film |
| 2012 | Body of Proof | Amy Patrick | "Falling for You" |
| 2012 | NCIS: Los Angeles | Polina Graceffa | "Neighborhood Watch" |
| 2012 | Hollywood Heights | Grace | Recurring role |
| 2012 | CSI: Crime Scene Investigation | Sabrina Walsh | "Play Dead" |
| 2013–14 | True Blood | Belinda | "Life Matters", "Fire in the Hole" |
| 2014 | The Mentalist | Brandy | "Il Tavolo Bianco" |
| 2014 | Murder in the First | Cindy Strauss | "Pilot", "The City of Sisterly Love", "Burning Woman" |
| 2014 | Masters of Sex | Serena Buckley | "Dirty Jobs" |
| 2014–15 | If Loving You Is Wrong | Yolanda | "The Colombian", "Game Night", "Nine PM" |
| 2015 | Murder in Mexico: The Bruce Beresford-Redman Story | Hilary Sanders | TV film |
| 2015–2017 | Casual | Skye | "Friends", "Such Good Friends", "The Table" |
| 2016 | Intricate Vengeance | Reagan Winter | Unsold TV pilot |
| 2016 | Rosewood | Suzie Q | "Atherosclerosis and the Alabama Flim-Flam" |
| 2016 | Heartbeat | Ruby | "Permanent Glitter" |
| 2016 | Forever 31 | | TV miniseries |
| 2017–18 | Six | Lena Graves | Main role |
| 2018 | Saving My Baby | Sarah | TV film |
| 2020 | Lucifer | Detective Dancer | "¡Diablo!" |
