= Temptation (play) =

Faustian play by Václav Havel

- Original language: Czech
- Written by: Václav Havel
- Characters: Dr. Henry Foustka; Fistula; Director; Deputy Director
- Genre: Faust
- Setting: Science Institute

Temptation (Czech: Pokoušení) is a Faustian play written by Czech playwright Václav Havel in 1985 that premiered in Austria on 22 May 1986 in the Burgtheater in Vienna. The play premiered in Czechoslovakia on 27 October 1990, at the J. K. Tyl Theatre in Plzeň. It premiered in the United Kingdom on 30 April 1987 at The Other Place Theatre, Stratford upon Avon. It premiered in the United States on 9 April 1989, at The Public Theater in New York City. In 1989, Temptation was translated to English by the Czech author and journalist Marie Winn.

== Plot ==
=== Background ===
Temptation takes place at a science institute. The characters, having worked together at the Institute for an unspecified amount of time, are fairly familiar with one another. They have attended office parties together, and exist as a "community" of scholars tasked with the advancement of scientific (and strictly scientific) knowledge.

=== Synopsis ===
Scene 1: the play begins in a room in the Institute. Doctor Foustka, the main character and representation of the Faust character in the play, walks in on his associates, is welcomed and asked about his private studies. Foustka quickly rejects working on private studies, and the other characters smile at one another. The Deputy and Director (the primary antagonist and representation of Satan) walk in, and the Director explains to the group that the Institute, an institute of science, must prevail against the growing cult/fad of black magic.

Scene 2: in his apartment, the Doctor uses black magic to call upon a wizard named Fistula, a cripple, and clear representation of Mephistopheles in the play. After a number of odd exchanges, Fistula agrees to help Foustka with his study of black magic in exchange for a testimony that Fistula helped him.

Scene 3: at the office party later that night, the wizard demonstrates his powers by making Foustka's love interest, Marketa, fall in love with him and kiss him.

Scene 4: Foustka's girlfriend, Vilma, sees this. In her bedroom later that night, Vilma confronts Foustka about his interactions with Marketa. Foustka counters by bringing up the dancer, but they make up. When the dancer drops off flowers for Vilma, Foustka loses it and slaps her to the ground.

Scene 5: back in the original room, a replay of the opening scene occurs up until the Director's announcement. He accuses Foustka of betraying the Institute's noble cause of science by studying and even using black magic. Foustka is guaranteed an "innocent until proven guilty" trial.

Scene 6: returning to his study, Foustka again meets Fistula and they argue about the "stunt" pulled at the party. Fistula diagnoses Foustka with CDS, a syndrome of looking over one's past mistakes. Fistula tells Foustka that Vilma exposed him, among other things, and Foustka seems doubtful.

Scene 7: in the original room again, Doctor Foustka's "trial" begins. Foustka is able to convince everyone that his studies of dark magic were for scientific purposes, and is subsequently celebrated for his brilliance; the group's next party is revealed to be a costume party featuring witches, wizards, etc., planned in order to mock black magic and celebrate Dr. Foustka's research.

Scene 8: back in Vilma's bedroom, Foustka accuses Vilma of revealing his activities to the Director, to which Vilma responds with a breakup. Distraught and upset, Foustka attempts to strangle Vilma, but the Dancer arrives and is allowed in. The Dancer comes in and dances with Vilma while Foustka sits helplessly and watches.

Scene 9: back in Foustka's apartment, Houbova gives her concerns about Fistula to Foustka, all of which Foustka ignores. Fistula is let in and accuses Foustka of breaking their deal to keep their meetings secret. Foustka, resembling his earlier trial, convinces Fistula that he only revealed their meetings to gain the Director's trust and to further the interests of dark magic. Fistula, content, says that the devil himself wouldn't have tolerated a deal-breaking like that.

Scene 10: at the costume party, Foustka repeatedly fails to gain the Director's attention. When he finally does, the Director reveals that he was on to Foustka from the start; he also reveals that Fistula was his accomplice in finding out the truth. He states that you cannot serve two masters for your own interests. As the Director makes his speech, everyone from the institute surrounds Foustka, he is set on fire, smoke covers everything and the play ends.

== Reviews and critiques ==
Reviews of the play and its elements have been mixed among critics. The repetition seen throughout Temptation, which is meant to mesmerize the audience and heighten the suspense of the play, has been described as both "meaningful" and "deadening because no new insights are revealed." Performances of Fistula have been praised, his character being described as "terrifyingly mysterious" and "quirky, outlandish and completely riveting." Walter Brandes has been praised for his performance of Doctor Foustka, as he "navigates the character's precarious duplicity with expertise" and endures the character's long-winded presence on stage.

== Themes and motifs ==
=== Totalitarianism ===
Havel believed in the importance of allowing experience to dictate one’s approach to politics, society, and even morality. His approach to diplomacy inspired many schools of thought that are still prominent today. The programmatic style of government seen in Temptation discouraged the influence of personal experience leading to enslavement. Havel relied on "a ceaseless process of searching, demystification and penetration beneath the surface of phenomena." Havel suggested that an open-ended, constant journey for enlightenment was a better philosophy than simply accepting a system that enforced a thought.

=== Power and politics ===
Havel also believed in the initial good intentions of all politicians. Havel saw the concepts of politics and morality as inseparable, and trying to handle each one individually as a travesty. Havel was very popular among ordinary Americans for his idea of an inherent connection between religion and politics. He believed that good men are often corrupted by the trappings of power and eventually stray from their original goals of pursuing the common good. Havel also believed that people entered politics for one of three reasons. The first reason was that one perceived a better way of doing things. The second reason is the natural search for self-affirmation in human beings. The third reason is the obvious benefits that come along with being a political figure.

Foustka is a prime model of Havel’s principles in action. Throughout Temptation, Foustka is caught between self-preservation and personal benefit. Foustka is obviously interested in the benefits of the employment of ritual, but winds up getting caught trying to play both sides.

=== Faust legend ===
The Faust legend had a significant impact on Havel before he began writing Temptation. While in prison in May 1977, a copy of Johann Wolfgang von Goethe's Faust was delivered to his cell, followed by Thomas Mann's Doctor Faustus, neither of which were requested. Of the time period, Vaclav himself said he "felt as though [he] were being, in a very physical way, tempted by the devil.

Havel wrote Temptation over ten nights one autumn at his farmhouse, Hrádeček. When he finished the play he was "physically and psychically drained". He fell down the stairs, he developed a fever, and stayed in bed with chills in a situation without medicine or food because he was snowed in. Upon returning to Prague, Havel "said that he had slipped away from the devil by the skin of his teeth".

The plot of Temptation is inspired heavily by the Faust legend—a man who sells his soul to the devil. Unlike the original Faust myths, Temptation's interpretation of the Mephistopheles (Devil) character, Fistula, is not a classically demonic figure; he is a small person who "gives off a distinctly unsavory impression." Fistula compounds the ambiguity of his character by stating to Foustka that "[Foustka doesn't] know if I'm a devil or only pretending to be... I might be, and then again I might not be."

Fistula strays farther from the Mephistopheles archetype by downplaying his role as tempter, offering Foustka the psychological explanation that Foustka only demonizes Fistula "to rid [himself, Foustka] of responsibility—and to ease [his] conscience." This modern approach to the character is also more personal and psychological than traditionally spiritual, as Faust expert Lorna Fitzsimmons even states that Havel uses Fistula to imply the Heisenberg uncertainty principle when he states that "the truth isn't merely what we believe, after all, but also why and to whom and under what circumstances we say it."

== See also ==
- Deal with the Devil
- Faust
- Works based on Faust
