= Hellacious Acres (film) =

Hellacious Acres: The Case of John Glass
- Directed by: Pat Tremblay
- Written by: Pat Tremblay
- Produced by: Pat Tremblay
- Starring: Navin Pratap
- Edited by: Pat Tremblay
- Music by: Jean-Francois Deshaies; Pat Tremblay
- Distributed by: Bloody Disgusting Selects
- Release dates: 15 September 2011 (Oldenburg Film Festival); 3 April 2012 (DVD)
- Running time: 108 minutes
- Country: Canada
- Language: English

Hellacious Acres: The Case of John Glass is a 2011 Canadian science fiction comedy film directed by Pat Tremblay, starring Navin Pratap.

== Cast ==
- Navin Pratap as John Glass
- jamie Abrams as Jamie Walker
- Paula Davis

== Release ==
The film was acquired by The Collective and Bloody Disgusting in August 2011 for a theatrical, VOD and DVD release. The film was released on DVD, VOD and became available for Digital Download on 3 April 2012.

== Reception ==
Evil Andy of Dread Central gave the film a rating of 3.5 out of 5, and writing that while the film "is certainly long and painful as intended", it "is also side-splittingly funny and that the grind is thoroughly entertaining." Shelagh Rowan-Legg of ScreenAnarchy wrote a positive review of the film, writing that "the entire composition of the film is well-conceived and deliberate in appearance and execution." The Montreal Gazette wrote that "Even though the situation that John Glass finds himself in is absurd in many ways, it also seems all too plausible, based on past and present experience."

The film received a negative review in HorrorNews.net.
