= The Infernal Cake Walk =

- Directed by: Georges Méliès
- Starring: Georges Méliès
- Production company: Star Film Company
- Release date: 1903
- Country: France
- Language: Silent

A surviving print of the film

Le Cake-Walk infernal, sold in the United States as The Cake Walk Infernal and in Britain as The Infernal Cake Walk, is a 1903 French silent trick film by Georges Méliès. It was sold by Méliès's Star Film Company and is numbered 453–457 in its catalogues.

The film features the cakewalk, which was booming in popularity in 1903. Méliès appears in the film as Pluto/Satan and as the grotesque dancing demon. This rhythm-dependent film was probably filmed to piano accompaniment in the studio. Special effects in the film were worked with trapdoors, stage machinery, pyrotechnics, substitution splices, and multiple exposures.

The Infernal Cake Walk features several examples of elements reused from, or later reused in, other films also made by Méliès. The demon masks in the film were originally made for Méliès's A Trip to the Moon (1902), where they are worn by the Selenites (Moon dwellers); similarly, the effect of dancing limbs had previously been used in Dislocation Extraordinary (1901). Conversely, Méliès reused The Infernal Cakewalk's grotto set in his later film The Damnation of Faust (1903), and recycled the will-o'-the-wisp effect in The Infernal Cauldron (1903).
