= Delivery (2013 film) =

Delivery: The Beast Within
- Directed by: Brian Netto
- Written by: Brian Netto; Adam Schindler
- Produced by: Adam Schindler
- Starring: Laurel Vail; Danny Barclay; Rob Cobuzio
- Cinematography: Andy Bates
- Edited by: Brian Netto; Adam Schindler
- Music by: Daniel Cossu
- Production company: Type AB
- Distributed by: Bloody Disgusting Selects
- Release dates: June 18, 2013 (Los Angeles Film Festival); May 30, 2014 (U.S.)
- Running time: 87 minutes
- Country: United States
- Language: English

Delivery: The Beast Within is a 2013 American found footage horror film directed by Brian Netto, starring Laurel Vail, Danny Barclay and Rob Cobuzio.

== Cast ==
- Laurel Vail as Rachel Massy
- Danny Barclay as Kyle Massy
- Rob Cobuzio as Rick
- Rebecca Brooks as Barbara Grant
- Consuelo Bingham Mira as Sairey Barton
- Peter McGlynn as Dr. Paul Shore
- Elizabeth Sandy as Jenny
- Colter Allison as Kevin
- Lance Buckner as Geoff Burroughs
- David Alan Graf as Dr. Bob Daniels

== Release ==
The film was released to VOD on May 27, 2014 before receiving a limited theatrical release on 30 May.

== Reception ==
Ian Sedensky of Culture Crypt gave the film a score of 90 out of 100, writing that "The terror that is harnessed onscreen should ensure that this is the last “found footage” demonic pregnancy feature the genre will ever need, as it is difficult to conceive of someone crafting a better one than Delivery: The Beast Within." Gareth Jones of Dread Central gave the film a rating of 4 out of 5, writing, "Thoroughly unsettling, emotionally poignant and incredibly startling in the finish, Delivery delivers the goods – though it might just have you stocking up on Durex." Jeremy Blitz of DVD Talk wrote a positive review of the film, calling it "a creepy gem, with great performances, an affecting story, and good effects". Mark L. Miller of Ain't It Cool News wrote a positive review of the film, writing that the film is "one hell of a pregnancy horror movie and feels like a modern day Rosemary's Baby."

Doc Rotten of HorrorNews.net rated the film 3.5 stars out of 5, calling it a "solid entry into the found footage genre". JimmyO of JoBlo.com gave the film a "good" rating of 7 out of 10, writing that while the film "may be minimal on scares", "the tension created from two compelling leads and an interesting approach makes it worth a look". Padraig Cotter of Screen Rant wrote a mixed review of the film, writing that "With little in the way of scares or overt horror for most of its runtime, it can feel quite drab and lifeless, despite solid performances. Instead of building slow-burn dread it's often just plodding, and while the build eventually delivers, its a little too late."
