= American Virgin (2009 film) =

2009 film by Clare Kilner

- DVD cover
- Directed by: Clare Kilner
- Written by: Jeff Seeman
- Produced by: Lucas Jarach
- Starring: Jenna Dewan; Brianne Davis; Rob Schneider; Chase Ryan Jeffery; Elan Moss-Bachrach
- Cinematography: Oliver Curtis
- Edited by: Keith A. Cox
- Music by: John Hunter
- Distributed by: Echo Bridge Entertainment
- Release date: November 10, 2009 (United States)
- Running time: 88 minutes
- Country: United States
- Language: English

American Virgin (previously Virgin on Bourbon Street) is a 2009 American comedy film directed by Clare Kilner, written by Jeff Seeman, and starring Jenna Dewan, Brianne Davis, Rob Schneider, Chase Ryan Jeffery and Elan Moss-Bachrach.

== Plot ==
Priscilla White (Jenna Dewan) is a prim and proper girl. She has a boyfriend, Brad (Ben Marten), but is "saving herself" sexually until marriage. She starts her freshman year at Pennington College as a scholar from her sexual abstinence group. In her dorm room she meets hallmates Chuck (Chase Ryan Jeffery) and Kevin (Elan Moss-Bachrach), Kevin's girlfriend Eileen (Ashley Schneider), and her own roommate, Natalie "The Naz" (Brianne Davis). Naz is Priscilla's polar opposite: she smokes cigarettes and pot, drinks alcohol, and is very sexually active.

Chuck is attracted to Priscilla, but she rejects his advances saying she has a boyfriend. The guys invite Priscilla and Naz to a frat party being held to welcome Ed Curtzman (Rob Schneider), producer of "Chicks Go Crazy" (a parody of Girls Gone Wild). Priscilla declines as she has to study, but the loud noise keeps her awake, and she goes to the party to complain. Naz feeds her alcohol-infused gelatin dessert until she becomes drunk. Curtzman continues to promote his show and films Priscilla (wearing a moose head) topless. A title says Priscilla is now 69% pure.

Told about her behavior at the party, and that it had been caught on film, she decides to travel to Detroit on Oktoberfest, with Naz, Kevin and Chuck, to recover the footage from Curtzman. In a strip club, where they had hoped to find him, Naz persuades a male stripper to dance for Priscilla, which she discreetly enjoys. A title says she is now 47% pure. Back at the hotel, Naz offers her some brownies: they are laced with marijuana. Under their influence, Priscilla wakes up and talks to Curtzman, who is drunk: neither in their proper minds, they let each other pass and Priscilla sleeps in the room of Rudy (Bo Burnham), Curtzman's cameraman. The following morning she unwittingly gives Rudy a handjob after assuming that Naz brought a dildo to their bed. A title says she is now 25% pure.

Still in search of the footage, the group breaks into Curtzman's truck, where they find a picture of his daughter, Becca (Sarah Habel). Curtzman and Rudy discover them in the truck, and a pursuit ensues. Priscilla loses Naz, but sees Brad at a distance: she follows him to an alleyway where she sees him having sex with Mary Margaret, her mentor at the purity society. Her boyfriend and her mentor are true hypocrites. Upset, she determines to lose her virginity. She tries to have sex with Chuck, but he turns her down as he thinks she might regret the decision. After trying to lose her virginity to some random strangers, she is found by Naz, and they return to Curtzman's event at the hotel. They are met by Becca, whom Chuck has located on the internet. Priscilla tries to talk to Curtzman again but is insulted, and Becca, overhearing the conversation, becomes angry with her father. Curtzman then makes disparaging remarks about the women who are participating in the event: these are accidentally broadcast over the PA system, and when he appears on stage the crowd humiliate him and leave him naked, the incident being videotaped by Rudy.

A week later, Priscilla is seen to have become close friends with Naz. She flirts with Chuck, and learns he too is a virgin. She receives a package containing the CD footage of the party at Pennington, sent by Rudy, and learns that she was not, after all, the topless girl, as she is seen vomiting beside the camera. Naz, Eileen and Kevin give her a lecture about condom use and she has a romantic evening with Chuck, both having sex for the first time. Naz (finally graduating) is seen with Kevin, hearing Priscilla's screams while having sex in the other room. The movie ends with Naz breaking the fourth wall to say "I wonder what would Mary Margaret say now?", while a title says that Priscilla is 0% pure but 100% satisfied ... eventually.

== Cast ==
- Jenna Dewan as Priscilla White
- Brianne Davis as Natalie "Naz" Stevens
- Rob Schneider as Ed Curtzman
- Chase Ryan Jeffery as Chuck
- Elan Moss-Bachrach as Kevin
- Bo Burnham as Rudy
- Ashley Schneider as Eileen
- Ben Marten as Brad
- Sarah Habel as Becca Curtzman
- Michael Dailey as Harold White
- Jean Lyle Lepard as Bernice White
- Bridgette Pechman as Mary Margaret
