= Fever Night aka Band of Satanic Outsiders =

2009 film

Fever Night aka Static Age Band of Satanic Outsiders
- Theatrical release poster
- Directed by: Jordan Harris; Andrew Schrader
- Written by: Jordan Harris; Andrew Schrader
- Produced by: Jordan Harris; Andrew Schrader; Steven Isaac Getz
- Starring: Peter Tullio; Philip Marlatt; Melanie Rose Wilson; Michael Q. Schmidt
- Cinematography: Jordan Harris
- Edited by: Jordan Harris; Andrew Schrader
- Music by: Jordan Harris
- Production company: Bad People Motion Pictures
- Distributed by: Gaiam Entertainment
- Release date: July 24, 2009 (Los Angeles)
- Running time: 85 minutes
- Country: United States
- Language: English
- Budget: $40,000

Fever Night aka Static Age Band of Satanic Outsiders is a 2009 American independent horror film written and directed by Jordan Harris and Andrew Schrader. The film was released on DVD and video-on-demand (VOD) through Bloody Disgusting Selects on May 15, 2012.

== Plot ==
Elliot, Warren and Terry dabble in Satanism and hold a ritual in an abandoned woods. When nothing happens, they return to their car only to find that it will not start. An accident happens, leaving Terry injured. Seeing a distant light through the trees, Elliot hikes toward the light to seek assistance, leaving Warren to watch over Terry. Terry disappears and Warren becomes frightened. He hikes into the woods seeking Elliot and encounters hillbilly seductress Jenny (Vanity Meers) and her inbred father Ned, but things are not what they appear as they meet the entity raised by their earlier ritual.

== Cast ==
- Peter Tullio as Elliot
- Philip Marlatt as Warren
- Melanie Rose Wilson as Terry
- Michael Q. Schmidt as Ned
- Vanity Meers as Jenny
- Claudia Sandin as Lucifer

== Production ==
Jordan Harris and Andrew Schrader both attended University of California, Santa Barbara, where Harris did honors art studio work, and Schrader was a film and media studies major. The university did not offer a film program in terms of production, so Schrader focused on film history, theory, and analysis. As the writer/director team was leaving college they decided that it was either make a film or "settle" for a mundane job within the film industry. On the afternoon of their graduation from college, they traveled to San Diego to begin pre-production on creating a 1970s style acid movie about Satanists. The film was shot on locations in Escondido, Lakehead, Los Angeles, Ramona, and Santa Barbara, California. The film was created on a low budget over a two-year period, and had its world premiere on July 24, 2009 in Los Angeles.

== Reception ==
Early theatrical release artwork

=== Critical response ===
Phil Hall of Film Threat found potential in the film, writing, "There is a great film in the first half of Jordan Harris and Andrew Schrader's Fever Night", making special note that "the film's set up is brilliant", but they felt the potential was not fully met. In a positive review, Quiet Earth wrote, "There's enough material, visually and semantically, in there to get you brain fried and scrambled, and leave you with a stupid contented face for hours." Fatally-Yours stated that they were so impressed with the film that they were initially at a loss for words and found it difficult to express the emotions engendered after having watched it.

Fangoria's Bekah McKendry wrote that the film's subtitle, Band of Satanic Outsiders was a favorite that "howls that this film is full of fun Mephistopilean escapades!". The Movies Made Me reviewer stated that he was "never big on the overly psychedelic style of film", but that the trailer "looked like it had a lot of fun to offer" and after having watched the film he found no reason to regret having done so, as the psychedelic aspects were selectively used. Though he stated the acting was better than expected, he faulted the film's pacing in the last 30 minutes. 10,000 Bullets wrote that, from a production standpoint, "just about every aspect of Fever Night is pitch perfect. The direction is stylish, the film's ambient sounds capes are superbly realized and the acting fare exceeded my expectations," but by the film's finale, it began "to lose its way".
