= D@bbe =

- Directed by: Hasan Karacadağ
- Written by: Hasan Karacadağ
- Produced by: Hasan Karacadağ; J-Plan
- Cinematography: Seyhan Bilir
- Music by: Olay Andaç; Türkay Türkmen
- Distributed by: MIG Film; Ozen Film
- Release date: 10 February 2006
- Country: Turkey
- Language: Turkish
- Budget: TRL 250,000
- Box office: TRL 81,465,250 ($2.2 million)

D@bbe is a 2006 Turkish horror film directed and written by Hasan Karacadağ. Its title is a reference to the Dabbe. It is the first installment in D@bbe film series, and released on 10 February 2006.

== Plot ==
People start to commit suicide using brutal techniques. Starting from the United States of America, this suicide wave spreads all over the earth. In a small town, a man kills himself after spending a lot of time on the computer. Following this man's death, his friends start to get e-mails from him. They also start seeing strange creatures around themselves. This is just the beginning of the doomsday.

== Sequels ==
The film was followed by five sequels: D@bbe 2 (2009), D@bbe: Demon Possession (2012), D@bbe: The Possession (2013), D@bbe 5: Curse of the Jinn (2014), and D@bbe 6: The Return (2015).

== Trivia ==
D@bbe-Dabbe (2006) is an unofficial adaptation-remake of the 2001 horror movie Kairo (pulse) by Kiyoshi Kurosawa. It features the same plot and structure, with scenes taken directly from its predecessor. D@bbe (2006) and its Sequel, D@bbe 2 (2009), follow the same timeline and are in a different continuity from the future installments of the series.
