= Satan War =

- Directed by: Bartell LaRue
- Written by: Bartell LaRue
- Produced by: Bartell LaRue
- Starring: Sally Schermerhorn; Jimmy Drankovitch
- Cinematography: Laura Andrus; Walter Klein
- Music by: William Eucker
- Production company: Janus Studios
- Release date: October 24, 1979
- Running time: 92 minutes
- Country: United States
- Language: English

Satan War is a 1979 American horror film written and directed by Bartell LaRue. The film is similar to The Amityville Horror.

== Plot ==
Newlyweds Bill and Louise Foster move into the house of their dreams but it quickly becomes a nightmare.

== Cast ==
- Sally Schermerhorn as Louise Foster
- Jimmy Drankovitch as Bill Foster

== Production ==
The film was shot on 16mm. It never had a theatrical release but aired on television. Satan War was released on blu-ray in 2025.
