= Dislocation Extraordinary =

1901 film by Georges Méliès

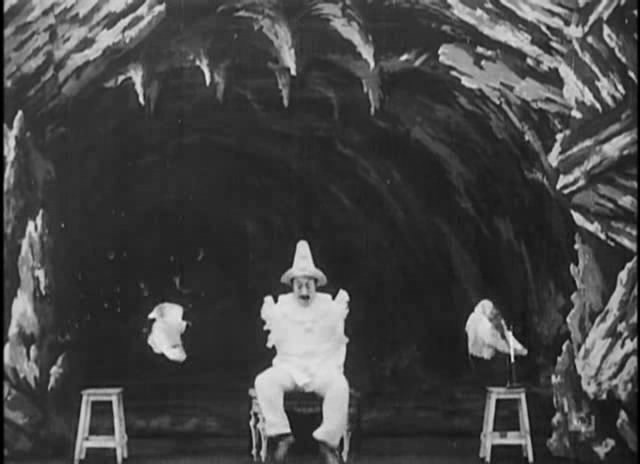
- A frame from the film
- Directed by: Georges Méliès
- Starring: André Deed
- Production company: Star Film Company
- Release date: 1901
- Country: France
- Language: Silent

Dislocation Extraordinary (French: Dislocation mystérieuse), also known as Extraordinary Illusions, is a 1901 French silent trick film by Georges Méliès. It was sold by Méliès's Star Film Company and is numbered 335–336 in its catalogues.

== Production and themes ==
Dislocation Extraordinary (1901)

The film is one of many in which Méliès plays with the idea of living body parts separated from their body; living dismembered limbs had been a feature of stage magic for some time, notably in the work of Nevil Maskelyne, one of Méliès's major influences. For Dislocation Extraordinary, Méliès combined this stage-magic tradition with the stock character of Pierrot, a commedia dell'arte character. The character had been familiar in Méliès's France since Jean-Gaspard Deburau's revival of commedia techniques in the first half of the 19th century.

The special effects were carried out with substitution splices and multiple exposures, aided by a black cloth background.

The film's Pierrot is played by André Deed, a music-hall acrobat. He worked with Méliès for some years, leaving in 1904 when he was hired by Pathé, to whom he revealed some of Méliès's secrets for special effects. Deed's later work includes the Cretinetti (Foolshead) series. Méliès returned to Dislocation Extraordinary's "free-floating limbs" in 1903, when he featured them again in his film The Infernal Cakewalk.

== Release ==
The film's title for English-language markets was Dislocation Extraordinary; however, Méliès scholar John Frazer, confusing it with a later Méliès film, referred to it as Extraordinary Illusions. The latter title is also used for the film on at least one home video release.
