= Bartell LaRue =

American actor

Bart La Rue
- Born: Jimmie Bartell Larue; January 23, 1932; Foard County, Texas, U.S.
- Died: January 5, 1990 (aged 57); Sweetwater, Texas, U.S
- Occupations: Actor, director, writer
- Years active: 1966–1973

Jimmie Bartell "Bart" LaRue (January 23, 1932 – January 5, 1990) was an American voice actor who performed on many US television shows including Star Trek, Mission: Impossible, The Brady Bunch (Episode 41), and Mannix.

LaRue wrote, directed and narrated the 1975 documentary The Ark Of Noah and wrote, directed and produced the film Satan War (1979).
