= Hasan Karacadağ =

Turkish film director (born 1976)

- Born: 20 October 1976 (age 49); Şanlıurfa Province, Turkey
- Citizenship: Japan
- Occupations: Film director; screenwriter
- Years active: 1999–present

Hasan Karacadağ (Turkish: [haˈsan kaɾadʒaˈdaː]; born 20 October 1976) is a Turkish film director. He has directed more than twelve films since 1999. His Dabbe film series has gone on to become a cult classic due to its distribution on Netflix. He was the director that introduced jinn into Turkish cinema.

Following the 2016 Turkish coup attempt, he is one of the 3,000 people who shared posts about the coup on Twitter, were detained, and had an arrest warrant issued for them.

== Early life and career ==
Karacadağ was born on October 20, 1976, in Province Şanlıurfa, Turkey. In 1998, he completed the Nippon eizo-juku Cinema Directing department in Japan. He directed many short films, documentaries, TV movies and TV series in Turkey and Japan. He participated in more than 50 international film festivals and won awards. He became known with the movie Hummadruz, which was shown at the International Istanbul Film Festival in 1999.

In 2016, he released the movie Magi, starring Michael Madsen and Stephen Baldwin, which marked as Karacadağ's final movie.

== Arrest warrant ==
After the 2016 Turkish coup attempt, more than 3,000 people who were communicating about the coup on Twitter were caught and arrest warrants were issued. One of them was Hasan Karacadağ.

Karacadağ, who uses the name Can Batuta, shared on Twitter, "April–May 2017. Chemical attack awaiting Turkish soldiers in the Syrian swamp. Follow me, I will write."

Karacadağ, who escaped from Turkey, resides in Japan. He was never seen again after his last post on his official Instagram account on December 31, 2018.

== Selected filmography ==
Year	Title	Role	Notes
1999	Hummadruz	Screenplay, Producer	
2006	D@bbe	Screenplay, Producer	
2008	Semum	Screenplay, Producer	
2009	D@bbe 2	Screenplay, Producer	
2013	Dabbe: Curse of the Jinn	Screenplay, Producer	
2013	El-Jinn	Screenplay, Producer	
2014	D@bbe: Zehr-i Jinn	Screenplay, Producer	
2015	D@bbe 6	Screenplay, Producer	
2016	Magi	Screenplay, Producer	
