= The Damnation of Faust (film) =

1903 French film by Georges Méliès

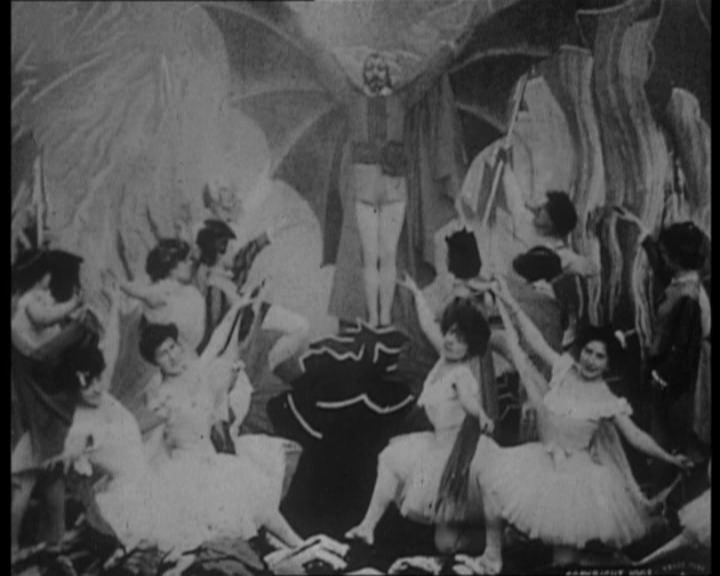
- Final scene of the film, with Mephisto jumping out of the floor and deploying his wings.
- Directed by: Georges Méliès
- Starring: Georges Méliès
- Release date: December 1903
- Running time: 6 minutes
- Country: France
- Language: Silent

Faust aux enfers, released in the United States as The Damnation of Faust, and in Britain as The Condemnation of Faust, is a 1903 French silent trick film directed by Georges Méliès.

== Production ==
The Damnation of Faust (1903)

Méliès had previously filmed two other adaptations of the Faust legend: Faust and Marguerite (1897) and Damnation of Faust (1898). The 1903 Damnation of Faust was his third version. In 1904, he would make a fourth and last straightforward adaptation, Faust and Marguerite, but his later films The Merry Frolics of Satan (1905) and The Knight of the Snows (1912) are also inspired by the legend. According to Méliès's American catalogue, the direct inspiration for the 1903 version was Hector Berlioz's musical work La damnation de Faust.

Méliès plays Mephistopheles in the film. The dancing masked demons have the same costumes as those in The Infernal Cake Walk, a Méliès film made earlier in 1903. The elaborate painted scenery for the film takes advantage of stage machinery techniques, including scenery rolling both horizontally and vertically; the sixth tableau was designed so that the set could repeatedly peel back to show new layers, allowing Méliès to show Faust and Mephistopheles advancing without having to move his heavy camera. Other special effects used in the film include pyrotechnics, substitution splices, superimpositions on black backgrounds, and dissolves.

== Release and reception ==
The film was released by Méliès's Star Film Company and is numbered 527–533 in its catalogues. On 11 December 1903, the film was registered for American copyright at the Library of Congress. Méliès's 1905 American catalogue advertised the film as "a grand fantastical fantasy in 15 motion tableaux, inspired by Berlioz's celebrated song poem", and pointed out that exhibitors could precede it with the 1904 Faust and Marguerite: "Our film No. 562, 'Faust and Marguerite,' which has met with unprecedented success, forms a natural beginning to the above subject." In addition to the black-and-white print, a hand-colored version of the film was also available at a higher price.

A 1981 publication on Méliès's films by the Centre national du cinéma commented that, although the ballet sequence is inadvertently comic, the rest of the film is "dramatic and expressionistic", with the dancing demons creating a "very modern" effect. The film scholar Elizabeth Ezra highlighted the descent into hell and ballet sequence as early cinematic examples of the tilt shot and the non-diegetic insert, respectively.
