= Beast of the Earth =

Sign of the Endtimes in Islamic apocalyptic

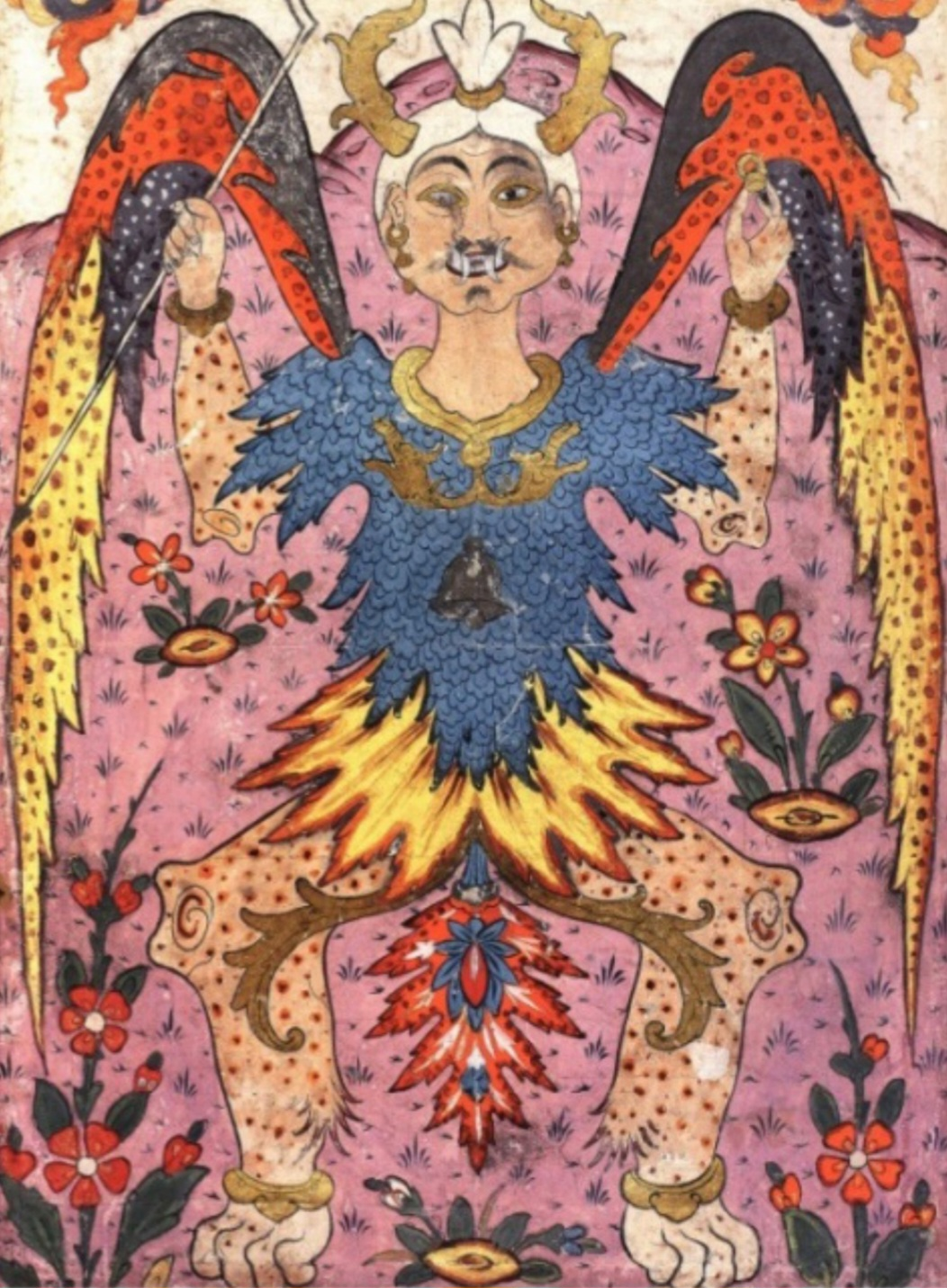
Depiction of the Beast of the Earth (Dābba) from a Falnama written in Ottoman Turkish for Sultan Ahmed I. Topkapi Museum, Istanbul.

Beast of the Earth (Arabic: دابّة من الأرض, romanized: dābbah min al-arḍ) is an eschatological figure in Islam mentioned in Quran 27:82. The verse states that, when the divine decree comes upon people, God will bring forth a creature from the earth that will speak to them regarding the lack of their certainty in the signs of God. No description is given in the Quran about the form, place, role, or origins of these creatures outside of this brief statement. The theology concerning them is heavily elaborated in later Islamic tradition, including in late hadith, tafsir, apocalyptic literature, and illustrated manuscripts.

== Etymology ==
The expression dābbat al-arḍ is composed of dābba and al-arḍ, meaning "the earth". The word dābba derives from the Arabic root d-b-b, with connotations of moving slowly, creeping, or walking quietly. In Arabic usage it can broadly describe any living creature that moves over the earth, including male and female animals, rational and non-rational beings, and in some Quranic contexts living creatures generally. The phrase dābbat al-arḍ also occurs in Quran 34:14 when discussing the creature that consumed the staff of Solomon.

== In the Quran ==
The expression dābbat al-arḍ occurs only once in the Quran, in Surah 27 (Al-Naml, or "The Ant"), Verse 82.

And when the Word is fulfilled against them, we shall produce from the earth a beast to them: She will speak to them, for that mankind did not believe with assurance in Our Signs.

— Quran 27:82

The noun dābba derives from a root meaning to move slowly or creep, and in Arabic can refer broadly to a living creature that moves upon the earth.

Classical and modern interpreters have generally understood the verse eschatologically because it appears in a passage concerning the fulfillment of divine judgment and the gathering of peoples.

== Hadith and apocalyptic traditions ==
Early Islamic interpretation of the Beast was sparse, but more elaborate views evolved over time. Later Islamic traditions expanded the Quranic reference by treating the Beast as one of the major signs of the Hour. According to reports about this topic, the Beast emerges near the end of time; the Beast speaks to humanity and distinguishes believers from unbelievers. This feature is reminiscent of, although not identical to, the presentation of the Beast in the Bible. Sometimes, the Beast is said to carry the staff of Moses and the seal of Solomon; the Beast uses these tools in order to identify people according to their faith.

These reports also vary over the Beast's appearance, location, and sequence among the final signs, and later works on the signs of the Hour often give more elaborate descriptions than the Quran or most exegetical treatments.

== Interpretation ==
Muslim exegetes differed over whether the Beast should be understood as a literal extraordinary creature, a human figure, or an allegorical sign. Fakhr al-Din al-Razi noted that the Quran itself does not specify the form of the Beast, and later exegesis depended less on the wording of the verses alone and more on transmitted reports.

Sunni and Shi'i exegetical sources have several interpretations of the Beast. In some Shi'i writings, the Beast was identified with Ali ibn Abi Talib or with the Mahdi. One comparative study of Sunni and Shi'i literature suggests that the two sources differed less on the narrative role played by the Beast and more on his identity.

=== Sunni exegesis ===
Sunni tafsir sources include descriptions of the Beast as an extraordinary, frightening, composite creature, but also preserve interpretations in which it is a powerful speaking human figure. Shi'i sources likewise include animal-like and human-like interpretations, while also transmitting identifications of the Beast with figures such as Ali ibn Abi Talib or the Mahdi.

=== Shia exegesis ===
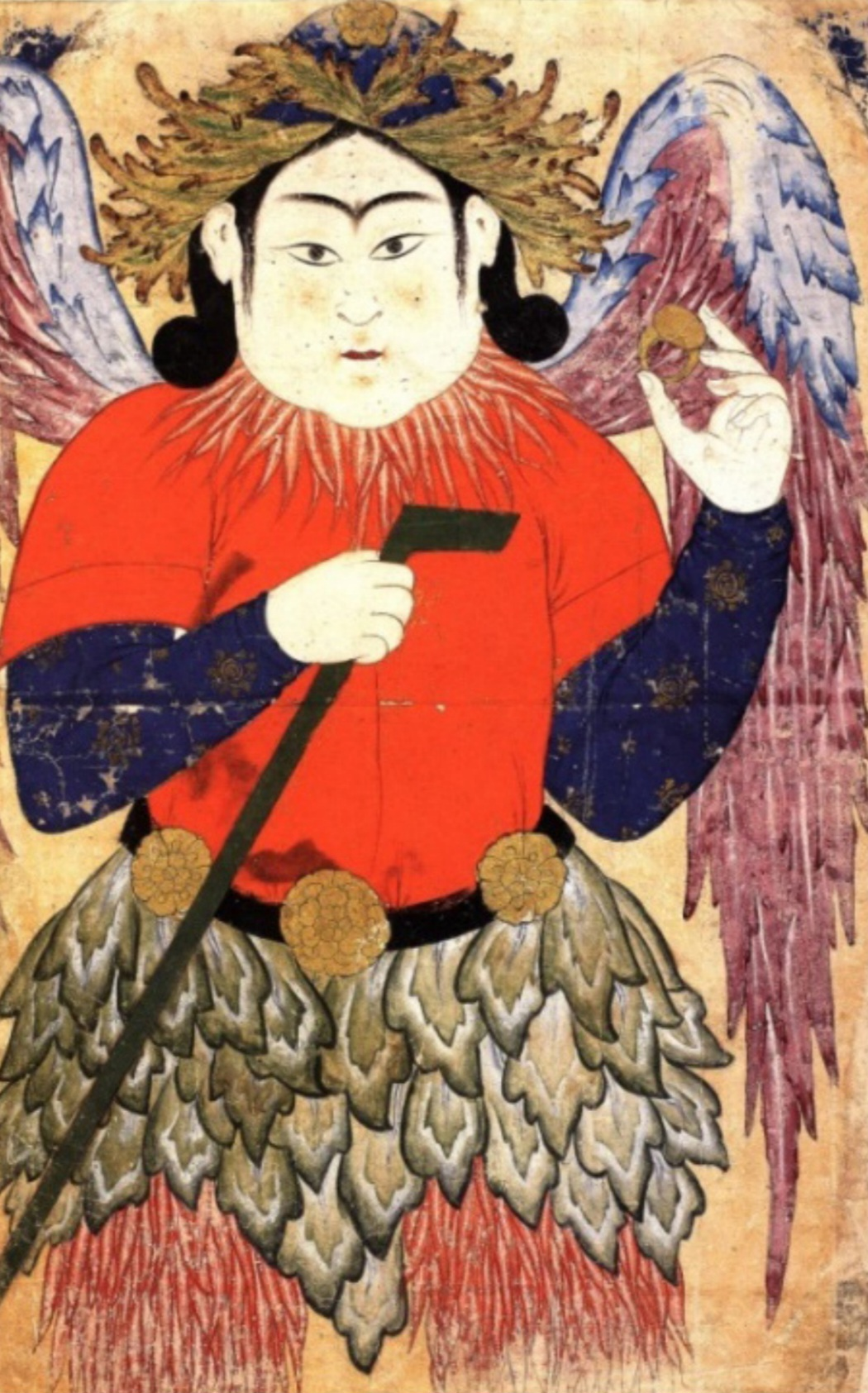
1570s Depiction of Dābbat al-Arḍ, from a Persian Falnama, probably produced in Safavid Iran. Topkapi Museum, Istanbul.

An interpretation associated with Shi'i tradition identifies the Beast of the Earth with Ali ibn Abi Talib. In some Shi'i exegesis, including in material attributed to Al-Qummi and Al-Tabarsi, Ali is presented as the eschatological dābbat al-arḍ who appears at the end of time to distinguish truth from falsehood.

In one report, it is said that Muhammad addressed Ali as "the Beast of God". Another report has Ammar ibn Yasir, one of Muhammad's Companions, identify Ali as the figure of Quran 27:82. For some Shi'i authors, the role played by the Beast in distinguishing believers from unbelievers was a clue to identifying him with Ali.

Other Shi'i exegetical sources identify the Beast not specifically with Ali but with the Mahdi or with a broader category of divinely guided figures who appear at the end of time to separate truth from falsehood. While these interpretations are prominent in Shi'i tafsir, they are tied to doctrines such as rajʿa which is distinct from Sunni theology.

=== Human and animal interpretations ===
Many opinions were developed about what type of creature the Beast would be when he came. Some sources describe the Beast as an animal, others as a monstrous composite being with the features of several animals, and yet others view the Beast as a human or human-like figure. because of his association with speech in Quran 27:82. Sometimes, the human interpretation views the Beast as debating questions of unbelief and error. At other times, it presents the Beast as a community of believers. Modern interpreters sometimes also propose symbolic readings.

Some Muslim scholars expressed caution about elaborate descriptions of the Beast. Fakhr al-Din al-Razi argued that the Qur'an does not itself specify the creature's shape, time, place, or detailed characteristics, and that only sound reports should be accepted in such matters. Ibn Ashur likewise treated many detailed reports about the Beast's form as weak or mutually inconsistent. Sayyid Qutb rejected highly mythologized descriptions as being a product of the influence of isra'iliyyat or similar types of traditions.

=== Modern ===
The majority of modern Islamic scholars accept the traditional exegesis of the Beast of the Earth, the Dābbat al-Arḍ as a literal creature who will appear in the end times. Umar Sulaiman Al-Ashqar was of the opinion that the creature would appear after another extraordinary event had occurred during the end of times - namely the sun rising from the west - citing in support of his contention the traditional exegesis of Al-Hakim al-Nishapuri.

== Comparative mythology ==
Comparative treatments of the Beast of the Earth have noted parallels with eschatological beasts in other religious traditions, especially Jewish and Christian apocalyptic literature. More broadly, monstrous end-time beings found across Babylonian, Zoroastrian, Jewish, and Christian materials.

In the Hebrew Bible and related traditions, figures such as Leviathan, Rahab, dragons, and monstrous beasts are associated with chaos, divine combat, or a final cosmic defeat of evil. The Book of Daniel describes four symbolic beasts representing historical kingdoms. The Book of Revelation describes beasts in relation to an opposition to God and the marking of the followers of God.

Descriptions of the a creature like the "Beast" in the end times, as a composite being, and playing a role in marking or distinguishing people have led scholars to make comparisons between Islamic and earlier traditions. The comparison is not exact, however. For example, in Islamic tradition, the Beast acts under God's command, whereas the Beast is an opponent of God in Christian tradition. Therefore, while the Beast shares a broader apocalyptic background across these traditions, no single tradition borrows the concept wholesale and without modification from another.

== In Islamic art ==
The Beast of the Earth also appears in Ottoman and Islamicate visual culture, especially in illustrated works concerned with apocalypticism and divination. Bahattin Yaman's study of Ottoman manuscript painting identifies several visual types, including human-headed animal forms, animal forms, and human-like depictions, reflecting the diversity of approaches to the Beast's nature in Islamic culture.
