= Faust and Marguerite (1904 film) =

- Surviving footage from Faust and Marguerite
- Directed by: Georges Méliès
- Based on: Faust by Charles Gounod
- Produced by: Georges Méliès
- Starring: Georges Méliès
- Music by: Gaston Méliès; Charles Gounod
- Production company: Star Film Company
- Release date: 1904
- Country: France
- Language: Silent

Damnation du docteur Faust, released in the United States as Faust and Marguerite and in the United Kingdom as Faust, is a 1904 French silent trick film directed by Georges Méliès.

== Production ==
The film is a fifteen-minute condensation of Faust, an 1859 opera by Charles Gounod based on the Faust legend. The previous year, Méliès had used a different musical version of the legend, Hector Berlioz's La damnation de Faust, as inspiration for his film The Damnation of Faust.

Méliès took the role of Mephistopheles. Jeanne Calvière played Siebel; she had been a stablewoman at the Cirque d'Hiver until 1900, when Méliès hired her to play Joan of Arc in his film of the same name. She remained among his core troupe of actors for several years after her debut as Joan.

Special effects in the film were created with stage machinery, pyrotechnics, substitution splices, superimpositions, and dissolves.

== Release ==
The film was released by Méliès's Star Film Company and is numbered 562-574 in its catalogues. The film was advertised in France as a pièce fantastique à grand spectacle en 20 tableaux (d'après le roman de Goethe), and in America as "A New and Magnificent Cinematographic Opera in 20 Motion Tableaux."

A piano score of selections from the opera was sold with the film. According to recollections made in 1944 by Paul Méliès, Georges Méliès's nephew, it was his father Gaston Méliès who compiled the score, which "followed the scenes exactly". The score had to be photographed in manuscript for reproduction, because having it engraved using printing plates would have been too expensive. One of these photographically reproduced scores survives at the Centre national de la cinématographie.

A copy of the film, apparently missing some scenes, survives in the Paper Prints collection at the Library of Congress. A short fragment of a hand-colored print of the film, featuring the fifteenth and sixteenth tableaux (Walpurgis Night and the Ballet of Celebrated Women) survives in an English private collection.
