= The Laboratory of Mephistopheles =

- Directed by: Georges Méliès
- Based on: The Faust legend
- Production company: Star Film Company
- Release date: 1897
- Running time: 60 meters; 3.3 minutes
- Country: France
- Language: Silent

The Laboratory of Mephistopheles (French: Le Cabinet de Méphistophélès), initially released in Britain and America as Laboratory of Mephistopheles and also known as The Cabinet of Mephistopheles, The Devil's Laboratory, Faust's Laboratory, and The Laboratory of Faust, is an 1897 short silent film directed by Georges Méliès, loosely inspired by the Faust legend.

== Plot ==
Mephistopheles, the demon who appears in the Faust legend, disguises himself as an old man and waits on customers in his laboratory. As the customers prepare to leave, however, Mephistopheles mystifies them with various magical pranks and cavorts under several animal disguises, taunting them with a beautiful vanishing lady and trapping them briefly in a cage. One of the customers, noticing a sword on the wall, manages to cut Mephistopheles's head off, but it remains alive and eventually reattaches itself to its body. Finally, to the great relief of the customers, Mephistopheles himself ends up trapped in his own cage.

== Release and reception ==
The Laboratory of Mephistopheles was released by Méliès's Star Film Company and is numbered 118–120 in its catalogues. It was shown at Méliès's own Paris theatre of illusions, the Théâtre Robert-Houdin, in early October 1897, along with four other new Méliès films: The Barber and the Farmer, The Charcoal Man's Reception, The Bewitched Inn, and A Hypnotist at Work. The newspaper Le Journal reported that the films were novel and received with much success. In February 1898, the magician David Devant toured British towns with the film as part of his act, advertising it under the titles The Laboratory of Faust and Faust's Laboratory.

The film has been cited both as the first Faustian film and as Méliès's first literary adaptation, and is believed to be the first film in which Méliès experimented with the special effect of multiple exposure. It is currently presumed lost.
