= The Omen (franchise) =

Horror media franchise

- Official franchise logo
- Created by: David Seltzer
- Original work: The Omen (1976)
- Owner: 20th Century Studios
- Years: 1976–present

Print publications
- Novels: The Omen (1976); Damien – Omen II (1978); The Final Conflict (1980); Omen IV: Armageddon 2000 (1982); Omen V: The Abomination (1985)

Films and television
- Films: The Omen (1976); Damien – Omen II (1978); The Final Conflict (1981); Omen IV: The Awakening (1991); The Omen (2006); The First Omen (2024)
- Television series: The Omen (1995); Damien (2016)

The Omen is a horror franchise, centering on a series of supernatural horror films, which began in 1976 with The Omen. The series centers on Damien Thorn, a child born of Satan and given to Robert and Katherine Thorn as a baby. It is revealed that Damien is in fact the Antichrist, and as the films continue - and Damien grows into an adult - he attempts to gain control of the Thorn business and even run for presidency of the United States.

== Films ==
Year	Title	Directors	Writers	Producers	Runtime
Original series
1976	The Omen	Richard Donner	David Seltzer	Harvey Bernhard	111 min
1978	Damien – Omen II	Don Taylor	Stanley Mann and Mike Hodges	Harvey Bernhard	107 min
1981	The Final Conflict	Graham Baker	Andrew Birkin	Harvey Bernhard	108 min
1991	Omen IV: The Awakening	Jorge Montesi and Dominique Othenin-Girard	Brian Taggert	Harvey Bernhard and Robert J. Anderson	97 min
Remake
2006	The Omen	John Moore	David Seltzer	Glen Williamsonn and John Moore	107 min
Prequel
2024	The First Omen	Arkasha Stevenson	Tim Smith; Arkasha Stevenson; Keith Thomas	David S. Goyer and Keith Levine	119 min

The Omen is the original film in the series, directed by Richard Donner and written by David Seltzer. The story introduces Robert Thorn, the American Ambassador in Italy who secretly adopts the newborn Damien to replace his newborn baby that he has been told was stillborn. When Damien reaches the age of five as Robert is transferred to Britain, strange events unfold, beginning with the boy's nanny committing suicide during his birthday party. Soon afterward Robert encounters Father Brennan, a Catholic priest who was present at Damien's birth. Brennan warns him that the child will eventually kill him and his wife, but soon is himself killed by a falling church spire. Only after Robert's wife Katherine is hospitalized and miscarries does he come to believe Brennan. Robert and a photographer named Jennings then travel to Rome, where they learn that Damien is the Antichrist and that Robert's baby was murdered so the Antichrist child could be raised by a politician. Meanwhile, Katherine Thorn is murdered by Damien's second nanny, Mrs. Baylock, who in reality is a member of the Satanists who arranged Damien's upbringing and protect him. Robert travels to Megiddo with Jennings to find exorcist and archaeologist Bugenhagen and be presented with the only means to kill Damien: the Seven Daggers of Megiddo. He initially refuses and it takes the death of Jennings then the discovering the Mark of the Beast on Damien's head to convince Robert to go through with it. Despite killing Mrs. Baylock after a struggle, Robert is killed by the authorities before he can kill Damien. The final scene is the Ambassador Thorn's funeral, where the President of the USA holds little Damien's hand, who turns back and smiles at the camera with wicked satisfaction.

The second film, Damien – Omen II, starts with Bugenhagen attempting to send Richard Thorne, Damien's uncle and new guardian, a package, but he and his friend Morris end up being buried alive in Megiddo. The audience is then introduced to Richard's son Mark and his second wife Ann. Now a teenager, Damien attends military school alongside Mark, while his subconscious, manifesting in the form of a raven, kills Richard's aunt Marion, Jennings's friend Joan Hart, and Thorn Industries manager Bill Atherton. Atherton's death is beneficial for senior manager Paul Buher, another member of the Satanist group Baylock was part of. Another member, Sgt. Neff, guides Damien to learn his true nature by advising him to read the Book of Revelation. Though fearful of it at first, unconsciously killing Dr. David Pasarian and a medical physician who tested his blood, Damien comes to accept his fate as he begins to consciously kill anyone who stands in his way, including his cousin Mark and Dr. Charles Warren. Though Richard accepted the truth upon receiving the Daggers of Megiddo from Bugenhagen's package, he is murdered by Ann; Damien then kills her, despite her being one of his disciples.

The third film, The Final Conflict, follows the adult Damien, now head of his uncle's company and arranging his position as American Ambassador in Britain to prevent the Second Coming—which would gradually weaken his powers—by having his followers slaughter every male British child born on March 24. Though he managed to kill six of the seven monks who each brandish a Dagger of Megiddo, their leader Father DeCarlo lives. Damien unknowingly causes his own downfall by his association with a journalist named Kate Reynolds who kills him at his moment of weakness. As Damien's death did not occur in the manner that Bugenhagen learned, the Antichrist only suffered a temporary demise.

In the fourth film of the original series, Omen IV: The Awakening, it is revealed that Damien's followers arranged for his biological daughter Delia to be adopted by two attorneys, Gene and Karen York. While nothing seems wrong at first, compared to her father, Delia is fully aware of her powers as she terrorizes her mother Karen. Karen finds herself pregnant and hires a private detective to find out about Delia's lineage. Along the way, she believes Delia is the Antichrist. A string of bizarre accidental deaths follows, before Karen gives birth to her son Alexander while falling into a paranoia as she tries to reveal her daughter's true identity. With the help of the private detective, Karen learns that Delia is the daughter of Damien Thorn while holding her family doctor, Dr. Hastings, at gunpoint. Upon learning Dr. Hastings is a Satanist, Karen learns that the reborn Antichrist is actually Alexander: Delia's twin brother whose embryo was inside Delia the entire time and implanted into Karen by Hastings. Though Karen adamantly wished to kill Alexander and tries to do so, the baby's powers cause her to commit suicide, leaving Alexander and Delia still alive to continue their birth father's work.

The 2006 remake of the first film, also titled The Omen, was directed and produced by John Moore. Starring Liev Schreiber and Julia Stiles, the film was met with mixed reviews but general box office success. With a budget of $25 million, the film grossed $54 million domestic and $64 million in other territories, totalling $119 million.

A prequel to the first film, titled The First Omen, was directed by Arkasha Stevenson and released in 2024. The film stars Nell Tiger Free as an American woman who is sent to work at a church in Rome but quickly uncovers a conspiracy to bring about the birth of the Antichrist. The film was met with positive reviews from critics and has grossed over $53 million internationally.

== Cast ==
List indicators

This section includes characters who will appear or have appeared in more than two films in the series.

- An empty grey cell indicates the character was not in the film, or that the character's official presence has not yet been confirmed.
- ^{A} indicates an appearance through archival footage or audio.
- ^{C} indicates a cameo role.
- ^{O} indicates an older version of the character.
- ^{P} indicates an appearance in onscreen photographs.
- ^{U} indicates an uncredited appearance.
- ^{V} indicates a voice-only role.
- ^{Y} indicates a younger version of the character.

Character	Films						Television series
Character	Original series				Prequel	Remake	Television series
Character	The Omen	Damien – Omen II	The Final Conflict	Omen IV: The Awakening	The First Omen	The Omen	Damien
Character	1976	1978	1981	1991	2024	2006	2016
Damien Thorn	Harvey Spencer Stephens Noel O'Connell^{Y} Uncredited infant^{Y}	Jonathan Scott-Taylor	Sam Neill	Harvey Spencer Stephens^{A}	Uncredited appearance	Seamus Davey-Fitzpatrick Tomas Woller^{Y}	Bradley James Harvey Spencer Stephens^{Y}^{A}
Robert Thorn	Gregory Peck	Uncredited actor^{P}^{Y}			Gregory Peck^{P}	Liev Schreiber	Gregory Peck^{A}
Katherine "Kathy" Thorn	Lee Remick	Mentioned			Rachel Hurd-Wood	Julia Stiles	Lee Remick^{A}
Carl Bugenhagen	Leo McKern	Leo McKern^{U}				Michael Gambon	Leo McKern^{A}
Mrs. Willa Baylock	Billie Whitelaw					Mia Farrow	Billie Whitelaw^{A}
Keith Jennings	David Warner					David Thewlis	David Warner^{A}
Father Brennan	Patrick Troughton				Ralph Ineson	Pete Postlethwaite	Patrick Troughton^{A}
Father Spiletto	Martin Benson				Anton Alexander	Giovanni Lombardo Radice	Martin Benson^{A}
Brother Matteus	Tommy Duggan		Tommy Duggan				
Nanny	Holly Palance				Holly Palance^{V}	Amy Huck	Holly Palance^{A}
U.S. President	Gerald Ford^{A}		Mason Adams				
Ann Thorn (née Rutledge)		Lee Grant					Barbara Hershey

== Reception ==
=== Box office performance ===
Film	Release date	Box office revenue			Budget	References
Film	Release date	United States	International	Worldwide	Budget	References
The Omen (1976)	June 6, 1976	$60,922,980	$17,783,566	$78,706,546	$2.8 million	
Damien – Omen II	June 9, 1978	$26,518,355	$8,500,000^{R}	$35,018,355	$6.8 million	
The Final Conflict	March 20, 1981	$20,471,382	—N/a	$20,471,382	$5 million	
The Omen (2006)	June 6, 2006	$54,607,383	$64,889,140	$119,496,523	$25 million	
The First Omen	April 5, 2024	$20,054,832	$33,320,788	$53,375,620	$30 million	
Total		$182,574,932	$124,509,928	$307,084,860	$69.6 million	
List indicators^{R} Distributor rentals. (Note: The gross rental is the distributor's share of the box-office gross and was more commonly reported than the exhibition gross up to the 1970s.) In the US/Canada, The Omen had rentals of $28.5 million and Damien – Omen II $12.1 million. If the ratio of gross to rental applied to the international rental, the films grossed approximately $99 million and $45 million worldwide respectively.: A dark grey cell indicates the information is not available for the film.; Omen IV: The Awakening (1991) has been excluded from the list as it was not released theatrically.

=== Critical response ===
Film	Rotten Tomatoes	Metacritic
The Omen (1976)	76% (110 reviews)	62 (11 reviews)
Damien – Omen II	50% (28 reviews)	45 (9 reviews)
The Final Conflict	29% (21 reviews)	34 (9 reviews)
Omen IV: The Awakening	17% (6 reviews)	—N/a
The Omen (2006)	26% (168 reviews)	43 (34 reviews)
The First Omen	83% (195 reviews)	65 (33 reviews)

== Television ==
=== The Omen (1995) ===
A television pilot titled The Omen aired on NBC on September 8, 1995. Directed by Jack Sholder and written by John Leekley, the hour-long episode was intended as an attempt to develop The Omen film series into a television series. Although Donner was attached to the project as an executive producer, the pilot failed and the series never moved forward. Unrelated to the previous films, The Omen follows a group of people who are tracking down an entity to which they are all independently linked.

=== Damien (2016) ===
A television series called Damien was in development at the network Lifetime before it was moved to A&E with Bradley James starring in the title role. The series aired from March 7 to May 9, 2016. The series, acting as a direct sequel to the original film, follows 30 year old Damien, who has forgotten his demonic past, facing his true identity. Ann Rutledge (Barbara Hershey), who has protected Damien all his life, helps him embrace his Antichrist side.

== Storyline continuity ==
The Omen story chronology
Original continuity
- The First Omen
- The Omen
- Damien – Omen II
- The Final Conflict
- Omen IV: The Awakening
Alternate continuity
- The Omen
- Damien (TV series)
Remake continuity
- The Omen (2006 film)

== Novels ==
There are five novels in The Omen series, the first three being novelizations of their film counterparts:

- The Omen, released in 1976 and written by David Seltzer
- Damien – Omen II, released in 1978 and written by Joseph Howard
- The Final Conflict, released in 1980 and written by Gordon McGill
- Omen IV: Armageddon 2000, released in 1982 and written by Gordon McGill
- Omen V: The Abomination, released in 1985 and written by Gordon McGill

== Other media ==
Three documentaries regarding the series have been made: 666: The Omen - Revealed (2000), The Omen: Legacy (2001), and The Curse of The Omen (2005).

The 1976 film was also remade in Tamil as Jenma Natchathram (1991).
