= The Final Conflict (film) =

1981 film by Graham Baker

- Theatrical release poster
- Directed by: Graham Baker
- Written by: Andrew Birkin
- Based on: Characters created by: David Seltzer
- Produced by: Harvey Bernhard
- Starring: Sam Neill; Rossano Brazzi; Don Gordon; Lisa Harrow; Barnaby Holm
- Cinematography: Phil Méheux; Robert Paynter
- Edited by: Alan Strachan
- Music by: Jerry Goldsmith
- Production company: Mace Neufeld Productions
- Distributed by: 20th Century Fox
- Release date: March 20, 1981
- Running time: 108 minutes
- Countries: United States; United Kingdom
- Language: English
- Budget: $5–6 million
- Box office: $20.5 million (United States and Canada)

The Final Conflict (also known as Omen III: The Final Conflict) is a 1981 supernatural horror film directed by Graham Baker and written by Andrew Birkin. It is the third installment in The Omen series. Starring Sam Neill, Lisa Harrow and Rossano Brazzi, the film tells the progression of the now adult Damien Thorn to a position of earthly power, set against the countdown to the Second Coming and the attempts of a group of priests to kill the Antichrist. Richard Donner, director of the first film, returned as executive producer.

20th Century Fox released the film to theaters on March 20, 1981. It received mixed to negative reviews from critics and earned $20.5 million against a budget of $5–6 million. Its theatrical release was the last for The Omen franchise until the 2006 remake, though a made-for-television sequel, Omen IV: The Awakening, released in 1991.

== Plot ==
Following the grisly suicide of the U.S. Ambassador to the United Kingdom, 32-year-old international conglomerate CEO Damien Thorn is appointed in his place, an office his adoptive father, Robert Thorn, once held. Having fully embraced his unholy lineage and having run his company for seven years, Damien now attempts to reshape his destiny by halting the Second Coming of Christ.

However, Father DeCarlo, a priest from the Subiaco monastery where Father Spiletto spent his final days and who has observed Damien from afar since his adopted father's death, acquires the Seven Daggers of Megiddo that were dug out of the ruins of the Thorn Museum in Chicago following the fire. (Note: As depicted in Damien – Omen II (1978)) Joined by six other priests, DeCarlo plans to kill Damien while finding the Christ child. Meanwhile, Damien becomes romantically involved with journalist Kate Reynolds. Learning of his assassins and killing all but DeCarlo over time, he proceeds to mold Reynolds's young son Peter into a disciple by playing on the boy's desire for a father figure.

After the alignment of stars in the Cassiopeia constellation on March 24, 1981, generating what is described as a second Star of Bethlehem, Damien realizes that it is a sign of the Second Coming and orders his followers to kill all boys born in the United Kingdom on the morning of March 24, 1981, to prevent the Christ's return to power. A week after a string of 31 infant deaths, Reynolds encounters DeCarlo and he reveals Damien's true identity to her while giving her evidence of the murders. Kate sleeps with Damien, where he brutally anally sodomizes her. The following morning she discovers Damien's birthmark.

Damien tells Peter to follow DeCarlo, resulting in Damien learning that his adviser, Harvey Dean, had concealed the date of his son's birth when Peter reports that DeCarlo visited Dean's wife Barbara and revealed her husband's role in the infant murders. Dean refuses to kill his son and plans to flee the country. He returns home to Barbara, who has killed their son while under Damien's demonic influence. She then kills Dean with a burning iron.

DeCarlo later visits Reynolds and reveals that Peter is now under Damien's influence and that the real Christ child is now beyond Damien's reach. Agreeing to help DeCarlo, Reynolds tricks Damien with the promise to bring him to the church ruins where the Christ child is in exchange for Peter. The plan backfires when Damien spots DeCarlo first and uses Peter as a human shield against the dagger. As Peter dies in his mother's arms, Damien throttles Father DeCarlo before calling out for Christ to appear before him and "face him". This leaves Damien open to be stabbed in the back by Reynolds using DeCarlo's Megiddo dagger.

As Damien staggers through the courtyard and collapses, Christ then appears in the archway above him as a corporealized bright light. Damien mocks Christ for thinking he has won, and then collapses and dies from the dagger's wound. DeCarlo reappears carrying Peter's body and hands him to a praying Kate. As they leave the ruins, Bible passages are shown on-screen.

== Cast ==
- Sam Neill as Damien Thorn
- Lisa Harrow as Kate Reynolds
- Rossano Brazzi as Father DeCarlo
- Don Gordon as Harvey Pleydell Dean
- Barnaby Holm as Peter Reynolds
- Leueen Willoughby as Barbara Dean
- Marc Boyle as Brother Benito
- Milos Kirek as Brother Martin
- Tommy Duggan as Brother Matteus
- Louis Mahoney as Brother Paulo
- Richard Oldfield as Brother Simeon
- Tony Vogel as Brother Antonio
- Hugh Moxey as Butler
- Mason Adams as U.S. President
- Robert Arden as U.S. Ambassador to Great Britain
- Ruby Wax (uncredited) as U.S. Ambassador's secretary
- Hazel Court (uncredited) as champagne woman at hunt

== Production ==
=== Locales and filming ===
The evening party scene was filmed in Brocket Hall, just outside London, which also substituted as Damien's residence. Kate, Damien, and Peter walk from Hyde Park to Speakers Corner. The Moors sequence was shot in Cornwall including Luxulyan Valley, and Roche Rock with added visuals for the lightning. The Disciples of the Watch sequence was shot at around 4–5 am in one night in the North York Moors. The finale was shot at Fountains Abbey in North Yorkshire. "Shooting here was very cold and very eerie," according to Graham Baker's commentary on the DVD. University of London Observatory in Mill Hill, London (identified as "Hendon" in Baker's commentary) substituted for the Fernbank Observatory for The Second Coming sequence.

The film reused footage from The Omen (1976) for an exterior shot of the Italian monastery. The film-location research website Reelstreets identifies the building shown as the Abbey of San Sebastiano in Alatri, Italy, rather than the fictional monastery's location in Subiaco.

Stuntman Vic Armstrong performed the backwards one-hundred-foot fall from the bridge. In Guinness World Records 2005, he described it as the most frightening stunt of his career. Most of his falls were less than seventy feet.

== Alternative titles ==
The film underwent several title changes during development. In September 1978, it was known as Omen III, before being retitled The Final Chapter – Omen III in November that year. By March 1980, the production was using the title Final Conflict. Other proposed titles included The Omen Part III and Final Conflict – Omen III. Although the film was released theatrically as The Final Conflict in 1981, contemporary publicity and reporting also used the title Omen 3: The Final Conflict.

In West Germany, the film was released under the title Barbara's Baby – Omen III.

== Music ==
The score to The Final Conflict was composed by Jerry Goldsmith, who had also composed the Academy Award-winning music for The Omen and the score for its sequel Damien: Omen II. The score was performed by the National Philharmonic Orchestra, conducted by Lionel Newman (who also conducted the scores for the previous two films).

True to the style of his first two scores, Goldsmith used an orchestral/choral blend with light electronic elements to create the film's sound, though unlike the soundtrack to Damien, The Final Conflict makes no pronounced reference to the original Omen theme "Ave Satani", which had earned him an Academy Award nomination for Best Original Song in 1976. Instead, Goldsmith composed an all-new theme for the character of Damien introduced during the opening credits which emphasized robust tragedy over the more horrific sound of its prequel scores. Goldsmith also composed a new theme for the rebirth of Christ first introduced at the end of "Main Title" and later given full Romantic treatment with orchestra and choir at the film's climax in "The Final Conflict".

The score has been released twice on album though Varèse Sarabande: first in 1986, featuring thirteen tracks of score at a running time just over forty-eight minutes; and an expanded version on 9 September 2001, which features fifteen tracks of score at a running time of just under sixty-three minutes.

1986 album

1. "Main Title" (3:22)
2. "The Ambassador" (4:45)
3. "Trial Run" (2:10)
4. "The Monastery" (3:13)
5. "A T.V. First" (2:45)
6. "The Second Coming" (3:16)
7. "Electric Storm" (5:17)
8. "The Hunt" (3:58)
9. "The Blooding Reel" (3:32)
10. "Lost Children" (3:40)
11. "Parted Hair" (6:30)
12. "The Iron" (2:18)
13. "The Final Conflict" (3:40)

2001 album

1. "Main Title" (3:29)
2. "The Ambassador" (4:50)
3. "Trial Run" (2:15)
4. "The Monastery" (3:17)
5. "A T.V. First" (2:51)
6. "The Statue" (4:11)
7. "The Second Coming" (3:25)
8. "Electric Storm" (5:22)
9. "The Hunt" (4:05)
10. "The Blooding" (3:40)
11. "Lost Children" (3:45)
12. "666" (3:03)
13. "Parted Hair" (6:36)
14. "The Iron" (2:30)
15. "The Final Conflict" (9:22)

== Reception ==
The Final Conflict received mixed to negative reviews from critics. On review aggregator website Rotten Tomatoes, the film received an approval rating of 29% based on 21 reviews, with an average rating of 4.4/10.

Roger Ebert gave the film 2 stars out of 4, writing that it became "a growing disappointment, as we realize that the apocalyptic confrontation between the forces of good and evil is being reduced to a bunch of guys with Italian accents running around trying to stab Damien in the back." Ebert and Gene Siskel also gave the film "No" ratings on their TV show, finding the movie to be boring and small-scale relative to the material it was trying to present, and concluding they were happy that the OMEN series had come to its stopping point. Variety called the film "the funniest one yet" in the Omen series, adding that Neill played his part "with an emotional range of shifting his eyes to the left, then shifting his eyes to the right, a practice no doubt perfected while watching dailies." Sheila Benson of the Los Angeles Times praised the film for mostly avoiding "the sort of tacky, splashy deaths" of the first two entries and concluded that Baker "has rounded off the gaudy trilogy with the most surprising qualities possible: intelligence and elegant visual style." Gary Arnold of The Washington Post wrote that the film "makes no case for prolonging the saga of 'The Omen' one last groggy round ... Moviegoers who expected the concluding chapter of The Omen Trilogy to supply a ringside seat at Armageddon should be prepared for conflict on a far punier scale."

Larry Kart of the Chicago Tribune gave the film 1.5 stars out of 4, praising Sam Neill's performance as "the only thing" the film had going for it, but criticizing the plot in particular as "barren of suspense. For instance, at the beginning of the film, we're told that the world is in an unprecedented state of chaos, which should be the case if the Second Coming is due. But never again do we get a hint of external uproar, as the characters toddle about in a London that seems in quite decent shape." Richard Combs of The Monthly Film Bulletin wrote that the film "somehow becomes a hell-and-brimstone version of Whitehall farce ... Damien just comes across as an ambitious junior executive who overreaches himself." John Marrone of Bloody Disgusting said that "[The movie has] some gore and darkness, but nothing compared to the first two – even Jerry Goldsmith's soundtrack is awkward – a little too 'noisy' and overdone."

== Sequel ==
An unproduced screenplay titled Omen IV Armageddon, written by Stanley Mann, is held by the Writers Guild Foundation. The proposed project was not completed. Gordon McGill also wrote a continuation of the series, Omen IV: Armageddon 2000, published by New American Library in 1982.

A fourth instalment, Omen IV: The Awakening, was subsequently developed for television by Fox. In November 1990, the Los Angeles Times reported that production was scheduled to begin the following month in Vancouver, with Mace Neufeld serving as executive producer, Harvey Bernhard returning as producer, and Dominique Othenin-Girard attached to direct. International theatrical distribution was also planned. The film was released in 1991, with direction credited to Othenin-Girard and Jorge Montesi.
