= Damien – Omen II =

1978 film by Don Taylor

- Theatrical release poster
- Directed by: Don Taylor
- Screenplay by: Stanley Mann; Mike Hodges
- Story by: Harvey Bernhard
- Based on: Characters by: David Seltzer
- Produced by: Harvey Bernhard
- Starring: William Holden; Lee Grant
- Cinematography: Bill Butler
- Edited by: Robert Brown
- Music by: Jerry Goldsmith
- Production company: Mace Neufeld Productions
- Distributed by: 20th Century Fox
- Release date: June 9, 1978
- Running time: 107 minutes
- Country: United States
- Language: English
- Budget: $6.5 million
- Box office: $35 million

Damien – Omen II is a 1978 supernatural horror film directed by Don Taylor. It is the sequel to The Omen, and the second installment of The Omen series. It stars William Holden and Lee Grant, with Jonathan Scott-Taylor, Robert Foxworth, Lew Ayres, Sylvia Sidney, Lance Henriksen, Ian Hendry, and Leo McKern. Set seven years after the first film, it follows a now-pubescent Damien Thorn (Scott-Taylor) as he begins to realize his destiny as the Antichrist.

Franchise producer Harvey Bernhard wrote the screen story, with a screenplay by Stanley Mann and Mike Hodges. Hodges was the original director, but was replaced by Don Taylor early in production. Unlike the first film, which was shot in England and Italy, filming of the sequel took place primarily in the United States, in locations around Chicago, Illinois and Wisconsin. The opening scene was shot in Israel.

It was released by 20th Century Fox on June 9, 1978, and received mixed reviews from critics. A sequel, The Final Conflict, was released in 1981.

== Plot ==
One week after the events of the first film, archaeologist Carl Bugenhagen learns that Damien Thorn is still alive. In Acre, Israel, Bugenhagen asks his friend Michael Morgan to deliver a box to Damien's new guardian, explaining that Damien is the Antichrist and that the box contains the Seven Daggers of Megiddo needed to kill him. When Morgan expresses skepticism, Bugenhagen takes him to a local ruin to see the mural of Yigael's Wall, which was said to have been drawn by a monk who had visions of the Antichrist as he would appear from birth to adulthood. Morgan believes him upon seeing Damien's face painted on the mural, but the ruins abruptly collapse and both he and Bugenhagen are buried alive.

Seven years later, the 12-year-old Damien is living in Chicago with his uncle and step-aunt, Richard and Ann Thorn. Damien gets along well with his cousin Mark, with whom Damien is enrolled in a military academy, but is despised by Richard's aunt Marion, who sees him as a bad influence on Mark and threatens to cut Richard out of her will if he does not separate the two boys. Late one night, Marion suffers a fatal heart attack after being scared by a raven that appears in her room.

Mark and Damien leave for the academy, where their commanding officer, Sergeant Neff, takes Damien under his wing, indirectly revealing that he is a Satanist sent to watch over him. Damien also stuns one of his teachers with his phenomenal knowledge of historical events and their exact dates. Neff then asks him to read Chapter 13 of the Book of Revelation, and that it was about him. After reading the chapter, Damien uses a mirror to reveal the number 666 on his head. Upon this realization that he is the Anti-Christ, Damien runs far. He reaches the lake and calls out, "Why? Why me?"

Meanwhile, over the following days, a number of other bizarre incidents surrounding the Thorn family occur: a photojournalist named Joan Hart who tried to interview Richard after seeing Yigael's Wall (and Damien in person) is run over by a truck after being attacked and blinded by the same raven that caused Marion's heart attack, a senior manager of Thorn Industries (a corporation owned by the family) drowns in a frozen lake, and two other employees are suffocated by toxic fumes following a gas leak at a factory plant. The latter incident also sickens Damien's class, who were visiting the plant at the time. At the hospital, Damien is the only student found to be unaffected by the fumes, but a doctor suggests keeping him in the hospital as a precaution. The doctor later discovers that Damien's marrow cells resemble those of a jackal, but is killed by a falling elevator cable before he can report his findings.

Meanwhile, Bugenhagen's box has been found during an excavation of the ruins and delivered to the Thorn Museum. Dr. Warren, the museum's curator and Richard's friend, opens it and finds the sacred daggers, along with a letter by Bugenhagen explaining that Damien is the Antichrist. Warren rushes to inform Richard. Mark overhears their conversation and confronts Damien, who admits to being the Devil's son. Damien pleads with Mark to join him on his rise to power, but Mark's steadfast refusal "forces" Damien to kill Mark by causing an aneurysm in his cousin's brain.

Shaken by his son's death, Richard goes to New York City to see a half-crazed Warren before being taken to the rail yard, where Yigael's Wall is being stored in a cargo carrier. As he sees Damien's image, Warren is killed in a freak locomotive accident, convincing Richard beyond doubt that Damien is the Antichrist. Upon his return, Richard has Damien picked up from his graduation at the academy while taking Ann to the museum in order for them to retrieve the daggers. After finding them, however, Ann uses them to kill Richard, revealing herself to be a Satanist and proclaiming that she has "always belonged to him". She screams Damien's name as a nearby boiler explodes, setting fire to the building and burning Ann to death. Left as the sole inheritor of the Thorn fortune, Damien leaves the burning museum and is picked up by the family driver as the fire department arrives. He smiles to himself.

== Cast ==
- William Holden as Richard Thorn
- Lee Grant as Ann Thorn
- Jonathan Scott-Taylor as Damien Thorn
- Robert Foxworth as Paul Buher
- Lew Ayres as Bill Atherton
- Sylvia Sidney as Aunt Marion
- Nicholas Pryor as Dr. Charles Warren
- Lance Henriksen as Sergeant Daniel Neff
- Elizabeth Shepherd as Joan Hart
- Lucas Donat as Mark Thorn
- Allan Arbus as Dr. David Pasarian
- Meshach Taylor as Dr. J. Kayne

Uncredited

- Leo McKern as Carl Bugenhagen
- Ian Hendry as Michael Morgan

== Development and Production ==
=== Development and direction ===
Following the commercial success of The Omen (1976), 20th Century Fox began developing a series of sequels. David Seltzer, who wrote the original film, declined to return as screenwriter. In November 1976, Al Ramrus and John Herman Shaner were hired to write the sequel, then known by the working title The Inheritance, but neither remained with the production. The finished film credited Harvey Bernhard with the story and Stanley Mann and Mike Hodges with the screenplay.

Richard Donner, who directed the original film, was unavailable for the sequel because of his commitments to Superman (1978). Hodges was consequently hired as director, but departed in November 1977 after approximately four weeks of filming, reportedly because of artistic differences. Don Taylor replaced him, and the change required eight days of reshoots. Hodges retained his screenplay credit on the completed film.

In a 2003 interview with The Guardian, Hodges recalled that during an argument about the production design budget, Bernhard removed a loaded handgun from his bag and placed it on a table. Hodges described the incident as frightening. In a 2022 interview with MUBI, Hodges maintained that he had left the production voluntarily and clarified that Bernhard had not directly threatened him with the weapon.

=== Casting and animal effects ===
Leo McKern reprised his role as Carl Bugenhagen from The Omen (1976), in which his appearance had been uncredited.

Animal trainer Ray Berwick was responsible for training the ravens used in the film. Berwick had previously trained birds for Alfred Hitchcock's The Birds (1963), for which he worked with approximately 300 birds.

=== Filming locations ===
Principal photography took place between October 1977 and January 1978, primarily in Chicago, Illinois, and locations in Wisconsin and Israel.

Filming in Chicago was completed by December 1977, after which production moved to Eagle River, Wisconsin, for approximately ten days. The Northwestern Military and Naval Academy in Lake Geneva, Wisconsin, served as the fictional Davidson Military Academy. The production involved 150 academy cadets and approximately 70 local extras. Scenes involving a fatal ice hockey game were filmed on Catfish Lake near Eagle River.

Following the completion of filming in the United States, production moved to Israel for additional sequences. The Israeli shoot was scheduled to begin on 17 January 1978 and last approximately two weeks.

== Reception ==
The film received mixed reviews. On review aggregator website Rotten Tomatoes, the film received an approval rating of 50% based on 28 reviews, with an average rating of 5.1/10. The site's consensus states: "Damien dishes out ghoulish scares and a Biblical body count to generate some morbid fun, but this repetitious sequel lacks the sophistication of its predecessor."

Vincent Canby of The New York Times wrote, "Perhaps my resistance has given out but Damien—Omen II, though it's as foolish as the first film, is rather more fun to watch and sometimes very stylish-looking." Variety wrote, "Damien is obviously wearing out his welcome, but presold interest and a couple of gruesome, ghastly death scenes should shore up business for the summer." Gene Siskel of the Chicago Tribune found it inferior to the original because "there's nothing particularly surprising or horrifying about a teen-ager in league with the devil. Also, the commotion the kid inspires this time is not particularly frightening." Gary Arnold of The Washington Post wrote, "Far from advancing the unsavory premise of the first film, this one doggedly retraces its steps. The result is an inferior copy rather than a narrative continuation." Charles Champlin of the Los Angeles Times wrote, "For all its slavish copying of the original, Damien — Omen II plays differently. It's a hoot instead of a scream. Its deaths are frequent and exceedingly graphic, but you wait for them as for the acts on a variety bill. The connective tissue is frailer this time, and there is almost no accumulation of suspense." Richard Combs of The Monthly Film Bulletin wrote, "The main trouble with the Evil One as a protagonist is that his opposition never looks very convincing—and like its predecessor, Omen II is based on a rather lame structure in which successive individuals discover something amiss about Damien and then meet an inexorably bloody end."

=== Box office ===
The film opened at number one at the US box office with a gross of $3,880,880 in its opening weekend from 524 theaters. It went on to gross $26.5 million in the United States and Canada, generating theatrical rentals of $12.1 million. Worldwide, it earned rentals of $20.6 million compared to $46.3 million for the original.

== Soundtrack ==
Damien: Omen II

Soundtrack album by Jerry Goldsmith
- Released: 1978
- Genre: Film music
- Label: 20th Century Fox T-563
- Producer: Jerry Goldsmith

Professional ratings
Review scores
Source	Rating
AllMusic	3/5 stars

Jerry Goldsmith, who composed the Academy Award-winning score for The Omen (1976), returned to compose the music for Damien – Omen II. The film's original score made extensive use of electronic effects alongside orchestral and choral elements.

The film's soundtrack album was rerecorded in the United Kingdom under the direction of Lionel Newman. In 2001, Varèse Sarabande issued a Deluxe Edition containing both the earlier album recording and the original film score, including previously unreleased material. Reviewing the edition for The Film Music Journal in 2002, a critic noted the greater prominence of electronic instrumentation in the original recording compared with the album version. (The film soundtrack is listed from track 11 onwards).

All music is composed by Jerry Goldsmith.

Damien: Omen II (Deluxe Edition)
No.	Title	Length
1.	"Main Title"	5:05
2.	"Runaway Train"	2:41
3.	"Claws"	3:16
4.	"Thoughtful Night"	3:08
5.	"Broken Ice"	2:21
6.	"Fallen Temple"	2:57
7.	"I Love You, Mark"	4:39
8.	"Shafted"	3:03
9.	"The Knife"	3:23
10.	"End Title (All the Power)"	3:30
11.	"Main Title (Film Version)"	2:06
12.	"Face of the Antichrist (Film Version)"	2:21
13.	"Fallen Temple (Film Version)"	1:35
14.	"Aunt Marion's Visitor (Film Version)"	0:39
15.	"Another Thorn (Film Version)"	1:19
16.	"A Ravenous Killing (Film Version)"	3:09
17.	"Snowmobiles (Film Version)"	1:14
18.	"Broken Ice (Film Version)"	2:23
19.	"Number of the Beast (Film Version)"	1:35
20.	"Shafted (Film Version)"	3:03
21.	"The Daggers (Film Version)"	1:59
22.	"Thoughtful Night (Film Version)"	2:39
23.	"I Love You, Mark (Film Version)"	4:14
24.	"Runaway Train (Film Version)"	1:12
25.	"The Boy Has to Die (Film Version)"	1:27
26.	"All the Power and End Title (Film Version)"	3:15
Total length:		1:08:00

== Home media ==
Damien – Omen II was among the original Omen films reissued on DVD by 20th Century Fox Home Entertainment in 2006, coinciding with the home-video release of the 2006 remake of The Omen.

In 2008, the film was released on Blu-ray as part of The Omen Collection, a four-disc box set containing the original Omen trilogy and the 2006 remake. The release included an audio commentary by producer Harvey Bernhard and the film's theatrical trailer.
