= Damien (TV series) =

A&E television series

- Genre: Drama; Horror
- Based on: The Omen by David Seltzer
- Developed by: Glen Mazzara
- Starring: Bradley James; Megalyn Echikunwoke; Omid Abtahi; David Meunier; Barbara Hershey
- Composer: Bear McCreary
- Country of origin: United States
- Original language: English
- No. of seasons: 1
- No. of episodes: 10

Production
- Executive producers: Glen Mazzara; Ross Fineman; Pancho Mansfield; Shekhar Kapur
- Production locations: Toronto, Ontario, Canada
- Cinematography: Luc Montpellier
- Editors: Nathan Gunn; Hunter M. Via; Brock Hammitt; Stewart Schill
- Camera setup: Single-camera
- Running time: 43 minutes
- Production companies: 44 Strong Productions; Fineman Entertainment; Fox 21 Television Studios

Original release
- Network: A&E
- Release: March 7 – May 9, 2016

Damien is an A&E television series based on the horror film series The Omen, which serves as a direct sequel to the 1976 film of the same title and ignores the film's various sequels. The show was ordered as a series on August 25, 2014, by Lifetime, but was moved to A&E on April 29, 2015, where it premiered on March 7, 2016.

On May 20, 2016, A&E cancelled the series after one season.

== Synopsis ==
Based on the 1976 film The Omen, Damien follows the adult life of Damien Thorn (Bradley James), now a 30-year-old war photographer who has forgotten his Satanic past, facing his true identity. Ann Rutledge (Barbara Hershey), who has protected Damien all his life, will help him embrace his Antichrist side.

== Cast ==
=== Main cast ===
- Bradley James as Damien Thorn
  - Harvey Spencer Stephens as young Damien (appearance in archive footage only)
- Megalyn Echikunwoke as Simone Baptiste
- Omid Abtahi as Amani Golkar
- David Meunier as Detective James Shay
- Barbara Hershey as Ann Thorn (née Rutledge)

=== Recurring cast ===
- Scott Wilson as John Lyons
- Gerry Pearson as The Cassocked Man
- Brody Bover as Jacob Shay
- Melanie Scrofano as Veronica Selvaggio
- Sandrine Holt as Paula Sciarra
- Tiffany Hines as Kelly Baptiste

== Production ==
Flashbacks to Damien's childhood use clips from the original 1976 film The Omen.

The Daggers of Megiddo props were recreated for the production referencing the original 1976 film props for details. They were made by Alan Elliott, a UK-based prop maker.

== Episodes ==
No.	Title	Directed by	Written by	Original release date	U.S. viewers (millions)
1	"The Beast Rises"	Shekhar Kapur	Glen Mazzara	March 7, 2016	0.753
On the day of his 30th birthday, Damien Thorn, a war photographer, has a traumatic experience with a possessed old woman while on assignment in the Christian Quarter of the Old City in Damascus, Syria. In order to find answers, he reunites with his ex-girlfriend and journalist Kelly Baptiste, but disturbing visions of his past flash before his eyes and he learns from a biblical professor that he is the Antichrist and he later discovers the number of the Beast birthmark on his scalp.
2	"Second Death"	Ernest R. Dickerson	Mark H. Kruger	March 14, 2016	0.535
As a man is given one of the seven daggers of Megiddo to use to kill Damien, the funeral for Kelly takes place. Damien attends but feels the religious symbolism close in on him. Ann Rutledge, who has sworn an oath to protect Damien since childhood, saves him from Detective Shay's interrogation following the failed assassination attempt. Damien insists on knowing their connection, and she leads him to a vault containing items of his that she has collected, which unlocks more of his fractured evil memory.
3	"The Deliverer"	Guillermo Navarro	Ryan C. Coleman	March 21, 2016	0.515
Damien's chat with Ann leads him to John Lyons, then-White House Chief of Staff who helped raise him. Lyons warns him of Ann's dark nature, believing she caused the fiery death of a staffer that tried to expose Armitage Global, a company now run by Lyons. The company is covertly set up to guide Damien down his path. Even though Lyons believes Ann's protective methods seem outdated, she still proves to be viable by having Damien chase her replacement into a subway station. Damien decides instead to save a young boy from an oncoming train, while the man mysteriously dies after his tie gets stuck in the escalator.
4	"The Number of a Man"	Bronwen Hughes	Nazrin Choudhury	March 28, 2016	0.479
Shay asks Damien to come in for questioning, mainly to ask why all the recent deaths are centered around Damien. They each threaten each other, before Damien mentions Ann's interest in him. When Shay visits Ann, she shows him the vault which is now a wine cellar and suggests Damien's time spent as a war photographer has affected his mind. Meanwhile, Simone's mother brings in a "witch doctor" to put Kelly's spirit to rest. He burns her belongings, which emits an orange flame before turning blue. In the ashes, they find her journal with the number 666 burned into a page. At home, Shay's son Jacob nearly drowns in the backyard pool.
5	"Seven Curses"	Mikael Salomon	K. C. Perry	April 4, 2016	0.371
Damien goes to the hospital to meet a psychiatrist about his PTSD and meets the family of the little boy he saved at the subway station. The father of the boy is a soldier, injured while serving in the army, undergoing treatment. When Damien asks to let him document his agony, the soldier confesses that he plans to commit suicide and requests him to photograph his attempt. Meanwhile, Simone steals the keys to Damien's apartment from Amani in an attempt to understand what her sister was trying to do before she died. Damien, quite disturbed after the soldier's suicide, goes to his parents’ home and tries to kill himself in the garage via carbon monoxide and injecting himself with something to lose consciousness. However, two dogs drag him out and guard him.
6	"Temptress"	Nick Copus	Richard Hatem	April 11, 2016	0.466
Damien wakes in the hospital to find Ann convincing the doctor that his suicide attempt is indeed an accidental drug overdose. He escapes to talk to Lyons to learn more about Ann. He also finds a tattoo artist who tells him that the 666 tattoo on his head was done forcefully. The doctor calls to tell him that they found hallucinogens in his blood, and he suspects that Ann has been poisoning him in order to plant the whole Antichrist narrative. He becomes happier as he realizes that the whole Antichrist story is made up. He tries to get rid of Ann by following her and, in the process, discovers his mother living quietly in a countryside estate. Ann catches up with him, and he accidentally pushes his mother to her death while trying to kill Ann. He leaves his mother's home but gets arrested by Shay, who leaves him in the car only to be attacked by the old woman. He wakes up screaming in the ambulance and later realizes that the whole thing is a dream. In the hospital, Ann tries to calm him, but, when she realizes that he hates her, she leaves and breaks down in tears.
7	"Abattoir"	T.J. Scott	Mark H. Kruger	April 18, 2016	0.432
Unexpected help arrives for Damien, so Detective Shay stumbles on Damien's old friend. Meanwhile, Simone helps a mysterious figure, and Rutledge offers Damien on something he honestly wishes.
8	"Here Is Wisdom"	Tim Andrew	Sarah Thorp	April 25, 2016	0.421
Damien struggles to manage his fate, which leads to a bloody confrontation. Meanwhile, Sister Greta and Simone meet Veronica, and Shay's eyewitness deceases.
9	"The Devil You Know"	Jennifer Lynch	K. C. Perry & Glen Mazzara	May 2, 2016	0.406
Damien requests for Sister Greta's assistance and Simone uses Veronica to get access to Rutledge.
10	"Ave Satani"	Nick Copus	Glen Mazzara	May 9, 2016	0.405
In the series finale, Damien puts together the ultimate sacrifice, after Rutledge and Lyons objects the people around Damien.
