= Prophecy (film) =

1979 American sci-fi horror film directed by John Frankenheimer

- Theatrical release poster
- Directed by: John Frankenheimer
- Written by: David Seltzer
- Produced by: Robert L. Rosen
- Starring: Talia Shire; Robert Foxworth; Armand Assante; Richard Dysart; Victoria Racimo
- Cinematography: Harry Stradling Jr.
- Edited by: Tom Rolf
- Music by: Leonard Rosenman
- Distributed by: Paramount Pictures
- Release date: June 15, 1979
- Running time: 102 minutes
- Language: English
- Budget: $9 million
- Box office: $22.7 million

Prophecy is a 1979 American science fiction monster horror-thriller film directed by John Frankenheimer and written by David Seltzer. It stars Robert Foxworth, Talia Shire and Armand Assante. Set along the Androscoggin or Ossipee River, the film follows an environmental agent Dr. Robert Verne and his wife Maggie filing a report on a paper mill in the river, not knowing that the paper mill's waste has polluted the river, causing mutations to man and beast alike. One of these animals, a local bear, runs amok in the wilderness.

A novelization of the film, written by Seltzer as well, was also published, with the tagline "A Story of Unrelenting Terror".

== Plot ==
While searching for lost lumberjacks in Maine, three members of a search-and-rescue team are killed by an unseen force. In Washington, D.C., Dr. Robert Verne accepts a job from the Environmental Protection Agency (EPA) to write a report about a dispute between a logging operation and a Native American tribe near the Androscoggin River or Ossipee River in Maine. Verne's wife Maggie accompanies him on the trip. She is pregnant but is apprehensive to tell her husband as he is against having children.

In the town, the local paper mill director, Bethel Isely blames the Native Americans, dubbed Opies (short for "original people") for the missing lumberjacks and rescue team. The Opies instead blame Katahdin, a vengeful spirit of the forest that has been awakened by the activities of the loggers, which Isely describes as "larger than a dragon with the eyes of a cat". The Vernes are disturbed when they witness a confrontation between the Opies and Isley's bodyguard, Kelso, which nearly results in the death of an Opie, John Hawks.

The Vernes see several signs of environmental damage: a salmon large enough to devour a duck; a deranged, vicious raccoon; plant roots growing on the surface; and a bullfrog-sized tadpole. Hawks and his friend Ramona Hawks ask Verne to include Opie perspectives in his report. They believe the paper mill operations are somehow causing grave danger to the environment and people alike. Hector M'Rai, Ramona's grandfather, claims to have seen Katahdin and describes him as "part of everything in God's creation". Verne and Maggie tour the paper mill to look for incriminating evidence. Although Isely insists the mill has excellent safety protocols, Verne notices that Maggie's boots have mercury deposits - a mutagen that causes birth defects, it is used in logging as a fungicide and does not show up in water purity tests because it sinks to the bottom. Verne needs more evidence and determines to take blood tests from the Opies.

That night, the Nelson family, who have set up a camp in the woods, are killed by Katahdin, which appears as a large bear with one of its sides containing horribly mutated skin. Isely and Sheriff Bartholomew Pilgrim believe Hawks and the Opies are responsible and try to arrest them. However, Hawks escapes. Verne, Maggie and Ramona take a helicopter to the campsite to investigate the killings. Verne and Ramona find huge scratch marks on the trees, while Maggie finds two mutated bear cubs, one dead and one alive, trapped in a salmon poacher's net. Forced to spend the night in the woods due to inclement weather, they nurse the cub back to health inside one of Hector's tepees. A distressed Maggie explains to Verne about her pregnancy and that she has eaten contaminated fish. Isely and Sheriff Pilgrim arrive and, upon seeing the mutant cub, accept that Hawks and his men are innocent of any crime. Katahdin arrives and attacks the camp in search of her cub. Pilgrim is killed but the others escape through tunnels beneath Hector's home.

The next day, Isely tries to reach a nearby radio tower to call for help but is killed by Katahdin. Later that night, she attacks the truck in which the others are driving away then decapitates helicopter pilot Huntoon while he is strapped to a stretcher. The survivors swim across a lake towards a log cabin as Hector gets mauled on the shore while confronting Katahdin. Verne drowns the cub when it attacks Maggie. Katahdin crosses the lake. She kills Hawks and knocks over the cabin, which injures Ramona and knocks Maggie unconscious. Verne stabs and shoots Katahdin repeatedly, forcing her into the lake where she drowns. The next day, Verne and Maggie are seen being flown away from the forest, unaware that another mutated bear (the cubs' father) is still active within the forest.

== Cast ==
- Talia Shire as Maggie Verne
- Robert Foxworth as Dr. Robert Verne
- Armand Assante as John Hawks
- Victoria Racimo as Ramona Hawks
- Richard A. Dysart as Bethel Isely
- George Clutesi as Hector M'Rai
- Burke Byrnes as Travis Nelson
- Mia Bendixsen as Kathleen Nelson
- Johnny Timko as Paul Nelson
- Charles H. Gray as Sheriff Bartholomew Pilgrim
- Tom McFadden as Huntoon
- Graham Jarvis as Victor Shusette
- Everett Creach as Kelso
- Kevin Peter Hall as Katahdin
  - Frank Welker Katahdin and Katahdin's cub (voice)

== Production ==
Frankenheimer was approached by Michael Eisner who wanted the director to make a monster movie for Paramount. Frankenheimer and producer Robert Rosen hired David Seltzer, who had written The Omen, to devise a story.

Filmed in British Columbia, Canada in 1978, this film marked the beginning of "Hollywood North", the major start to the development of a massive film production business in Vancouver and other areas within the province. Since then, hundreds of "American" movies have been filmed in the Canadian province. Scenes were also shot in Daisy Lake, Crofton, Squamish, Capilano Canyon, Britannia Bay and Fort Langley. In California, shooting took place at the Franklin Canyon and Paramount Pictures Studios.

Some scenes containing violence and gore were cut because director John Frankenheimer deemed them "gratuitous". The deleted scenes included a longer close-up of a Huntoon (Tom McFadden)'s headless corpse and a shot of Katahdin graphically disemboweling Bethel Isely (Richard Dysart), a flashback to the night where Dr. Robert Verne (Robert Foxworth) and Maggie (Talia Shire) have sex (deleted for time) and extensions of several scenes, including a longer tour of the paper mill and Verne fishing, which showed him falling asleep and later waking up in the sun.

The original concept for Katahdin was considerably more terrifying than what would eventually appear in the film. However, when Frankenheimer saw the concept, he suggested that it should be altered to look more "bear-like". The original concept was actually quite similar to the poster art. Frankenheimer considered Prophecy a film with far more potential than what he eventually delivered.

Frankenheimer later said he wanted to make an "R" rated version of the film but Eisner insisted on a "PG" rated one. "It didn't work as a PG," argued Frankenheimer. "It wasn't scary."

== Release ==
=== Theatrical ===
Prophecy was released in the United States by Paramount Pictures on June 15, 1979. It opened on 775 screens grossing $6,720,000 in its opening week.The film grossed $22.7 million at the U.S. box office. "It turned out to be a profitable movie," said Frankenheimer. "But honestly I don't think it's a well made movie."

=== Home video ===
The film was released on Blu-ray on November 26, 2019. A previous DVD was released by Paramount Home Entertainment on January 8, 2002.

== Reception ==
As of May 2025, review aggregator Rotten Tomatoes gave Prophecy an approval rating of 35%, based on 23 reviews, with an average rating of 4.5/10. On Metacritic, as of August 2020, the film had a weighted average score of 41 out of 100, based on four critics, indicating "mixed or average reviews".

Vincent Canby of The New York Times called the film "epically trivial" and "a feeble attempt to recycle the sort of formula movie one expects from American International Pictures." Variety called it "a frightening monster movie that people could laugh at for generations to come, complete with your basic big scary thing, cardboard characters and a story so stupid it's irresistible." Charles Champlin of the Los Angeles Times wrote that the monsters were "not particularly effective" on the screen and that the film "never approaches the chill factor of Alien, for example." Gary Arnold of The Washington Post called it "essentially an indoctrination course in liberal guilt, shabbily disguised as a monster melodrama. Indeed, it's such a motley monster picture that it may be lucky to attract fleeting snickers as a kind of poor man's Alien." Tim Pulleine of The Monthly Film Bulletin wrote that "once the narrative gets properly under way, the ecological sub-text virtually drops out of sight. As, even more confusingly, does the sub-plot about the heroine's pregnancy, leaving only a surfeit of creature-on-the-rampage hokum."

Richard Scheib criticized the film's monster costume, photography and lack of suspense, stating, "much of the film teeters on the brink of this unintentional absurdity and fails to emerge on the winning side. John Frankenheimer tries hard to generate tension during the scenes with the mutant bear pursuing the cast near the end, but much of the story is predictable and boring".

Cinema de Merde.com said "You don't get a lot of killing and the terror and suspense sequences really aren't that great, but it makes up for that in the sheer flamboyance of some of its touches, such as the amazing exploding sleeping bag. It's a bit of a bummer that after all the build-up, the thing turns out to be a boring old mutant bear, like ANY other mutant bear, but this is only because expectations have been raised".

Patrick Naugle from DVD Verdict wrote, "In an age of self-referential and cynical Scream horror movies and Silence of the Lambs knock offs, Prophecy has a certain something that just can't be denied. Prophecy even contains a MESSAGE (re: don't mess with Mother Nature or you'll be sorry), which is more than I can say for most horror movies produced today. Is it scary? No. Vastly amusing? You bet your bottom dollar".

== Bibliography ==
- Frankenheimer, John; Champlin, Charles (1995). John Frankenheimer: A Conversation With Charles Champlin. Burbank, California: Riverwood Press. ISBN 978-1-880756-13-3 – via Internet Archive.
