= Damien Thorn =

Fictional character

- The Omen character
- Jonathan Scott-Taylor as Damien Thorn, as seen in Damien: Omen II
- First appearance: The Omen (1976)
- Last appearance: The First Omen (2024)
- Created by: David Seltzer
- Portrayed by: Harvey Spencer Stephens (1976); Jonathan Scott-Taylor (1978); Sam Neill (1981); Seamus Davey-Fitzpatrick (2006); Bradley James (2016); Unnamed infant actor (2024)

In-universe information
- Aliases: The Beast; The Antichrist
- Species: Demon
- Gender: Male
- Occupation: The Antichrist; Businessman; Politician
- Affiliation: Satan; Disciples of the Watch Illuminati
- Family: Satan (father); A jackal ("mother"/biological father; deceased); Margaret Daino (biological mother); Robert Thorn (adoptive father; deceased); Katherine Thorn (adoptive mother; deceased); Layla (biological twin sister)
- Children: Delia York (daughter); Alexander York (son/reincarnation)
- Relatives: Carlita Scianna (biological aunt); Richard Thorn (adoptive uncle; deceased); Ann Thorn (adoptive step-aunt; deceased); Mark Thorn (adoptive cousin; deceased); Marion (adoptive great-aunt; deceased)
- Religion: Satanism
- Born: June 6, 1971 (original film); June 6, 2001 (remake)
- Weapons of Choice: Satanic powers Tricycle
- Enemies: Jesus Christ; God the Father; All pure souls

Damien Thorn is a fictional character and the main antagonist of The Omen franchise. He is the Antichrist and the son of the Devil. The character has been portrayed by Harvey Spencer Stephens, Jonathan Scott-Taylor, Sam Neill, Seamus Davey-Fitzpatrick and Bradley James.

== Appearances ==
- The Omen (1976)
- Damien: Omen II (1978)
- Omen III: The Final Conflict (1981)
- The Omen (2006, remake)
- Damien (TV series)
- The First Omen (2024)

== Fictional biography ==
=== The Omen ===
In the first film, but not its 2006 remake, Damien was born on the sixth day of June at six o'clock in the morning, from a jackal that died giving birth to him and was buried in Cerveteri under the alias Maria Scianna (in the remake this alias was changed to Maria Avedici Santoya). The orphaned Damien is then adopted by the future American ambassador to Great Britain Robert Thorn, who was told his child was stillborn, with his wife Katherine unaware of the replacement. It would be five years later, after Thorn becomes US ambassador to the Court of St. James's, that Damien's powers begin to manifest when his nanny mysteriously hangs herself at his birthday party, claiming to have done it for him. The strange events continue with new nanny Mrs. Baylock, who is later revealed to be one of the Satanists who have been waiting for the boy and acting on his behalf from the shadows, as Damien's true nature starts to manifest, from his violent reaction to church to most animals reacting fearfully at the sight of him (save for the black dog that Mrs. Baylock adopted).

Father Brennan, a priest from Italy who was present at Damien's birth, warns Robert about his son being the Antichrist, stating that Damien would eventually kill him and his wife. But Robert refuses to accept it until Katherine, revealed to be pregnant with another child, is hospitalized after being knocked off a balcony by Damien with his tricycle, a fall that kills the unborn baby. Accompanied by photojournalist Keith Jennings, who is eventually decapitated in a freak accident, Robert learns both the truth of Damien's heritage and the fact that his own child was actually murdered to ensure Damien's being placed in his care, so that he may rise up through the world of politics. An exorcist in Megiddo, Israel named Karl Bugenhagen gives Robert seven ancient daggers he inherited that can kill the Antichrist. Robert is initially against killing the boy until he finds the 666 birthmark that confirms his identity as the Antichrist. But when Robert brings Damien to a church to commit the deed, he is killed by police before Damien is harmed. At Robert's state funeral, Damien is seen in the company of the President of the United States before being adopted by his uncle, Richard Thorn.

=== Damien: Omen II ===
In the second film, set seven years after the first movie, the twelve-year-old Damien lives with his uncle Richard and his family; Richard's second wife, Ann, and his son from his first marriage, Mark. Originally, as with the first film, Damien is unaware of his powers, with the dark forces that protect him by killing anyone who learns his secret and poses a threat to him. This includes Karl Bugenhagen (from the first film), who attempted to have his friend Michael Morgan deliver a box containing the Daggers of Megiddo to Richard before the two were buried alive in archaeological ruins in Jerusalem. Damien is now secretly supported by other Satanic acolytes who eventually help him learn his true nature during his time in military school, which includes Paul Buher, Richard's vice president at Thorn Industries, and Sgt. Daniel Neff, Damien's platoon leader at the military school he is enrolled at. Though frightened at first, Damien accepts his unholy lineage and his destiny, though it's with reluctance that he kills Mark when the latter learns the truth and refuses to join him. Though disbelieving Damien's lineage at first, Richard learns the truth and attempts to set a trap for Damien, to kill him with the Daggers of Megiddo. But Ann, revealed to be a Devil worshiper, kills Richard before he can do so. Damien then incinerates her while burning the Thorn museum to the ground.

=== Omen III: The Final Conflict ===
By the events of Omen III: The Final Conflict, Damien eventually took over his uncle's company and turned it into a global business corporation. He is revealed to have attended Oxford, and the adult Damien arranges his appointment as Ambassador to Great Britain and overseer of the United Nations Youth Associations. But his reason for taking on his father's former ambassadorial position is that Britain is where the Second Coming will occur during an alignment in the Cassiopeia constellation and he needs to find and kill the Christ-child before his power completely wanes. While Damien deals with attempts on his life by a group of monks under the leadership of Father DeCarlo, each of whom possess a dagger of Megiddo salvaged from the ruins of the Thorn museum, Damien has his numerous followers kill every male British child born on the morning of March 24, when the celestial alignment occurred. But the Christ-child is revealed to have eluded Damien's followers. Another hindrance to his dominion comes from journalist Kate Reynolds and her adolescent son Peter. Damien's interest in them proves to be his undoing. When DeCarlo lures Damien to the ruins of an old abbey under the pretence that the Christ-child is there, he attempts to kill Damien with the last remaining dagger, but Damien uses Peter as a shield and Peter is stabbed instead. As Damien searches through the abbey for the Christ-child, Kate ambushes him and stabs him in the back with the dagger, ultimately killing him. Damien lives long enough to see a vision of Christ and dies telling him that he has won nothing.

=== Omen IV: The Awakening ===
In Omen IV: The Awakening, Damien is revealed to have a biological child in Delia, who was originally assumed to be the Antichrist reborn. According to the plot of the previous film, the Kingdom of Christ began much earlier and Armageddon was not prevented, but only delayed. However, the Satanists who are responsible for orchestrating Delia's birth reveal that she is actually the protector of the new Antichrist, her embryonic twin brother (which is very similar to Second Coming, but from the side of evil), who was inside her body before being transferred into Delia's adoptive mother Karen York. The newborn Alexander York survives his mother's death, after which he, Delia, and their father Gene attend Karen's funeral.

=== Damien ===
In the series which serves as a direct follow-up to 1976's The Omen, ignoring the film's sequels, Damien is an adult war photographer who has forgotten his Satanic past. Ann Ruthledge, the CEO of Armitage Global has protected Damien all his life and helps him embrace his Antichrist side.

=== The First Omen ===
In The First Omen, Damien was revealed to have been conceived as the result of experiments performed by radical members of a cult within the Catholic Church dedicated to turning the world from secularism back towards Christianity (specifically Catholicism) by creating the Antichrist to regain power and inspire religious fear-mongering. Their first attempt is to use a jackal (a supposed conduit for Satan) to impregnate young women. A majority of the births result in deformed stillbirths, except for two healthy females, a novice Nun named Margaret Daino and a young girl named Carlita. However since the Antichrist must be male, the cult believe they can create a healthy baby boy by having the jackal impregnate one of its surviving offspring. They lure Margaret to Italy where she is drugged and then raped by the jackal. This results in a pregnancy which produces twins, a boy and a girl. Margaret and Carlita are able to escape with the baby girl and go into hiding, while the boy is sent to replace the newborn son of Robert Thorn and is given the name Damien. Although not mentioned in the movie, director Arkasha Stevenson revealed the name of Damien’s twin sister to be Layla in an interview.

== The Omen remakes ==
A Hollywood remake was made featuring Liev Schreiber, Julia Stiles and Seamus Davey-Fitzpatrick. The plot of the remake closely follows that of the original film.

An unofficial Tamil language remake was released in 1991 under the title Jenma Natchathram. The character of Damien is renamed Xavier in the film and similarly features his supernatural presence and his birthmark in the shape of 666.

== Analysis ==
George Ochoa, in his book Deformed and Destructive Beings: The Purpose of Horror Films, identifies Damien Thorn from The Omen films as a "deformed and destructive being". Ochoa writes that horror film audiences possess an ambivalence of horror and delight over the continued existence of the film's "monster". He says of Damien, "It is horrifying to realize that the boy survived the final battle with his adoptive father... but it is also pleasing, because Damien—in company with... [the] ever-present Satan—is a well-realized DDB." He says the presentation of Damien as a character in the original The Omen is accentuated by his defeat of his adoptive father, who is played by Gregory Peck, known for leading man and heroic roles. In the remake, however, Damien defeats his adoptive father, played by Liev Schreiber, who is "not associated with playing heroes". Ochoa concludes, "The result was that [Schreiber's character's] defeat by the little boy was neither exceptional nor horrifying, just forgettable."

James F. Iaccino analyzed Damien in The Omen with Jungian psychology, "To paraphrase Jung, his psyche is animalistic, primordial, and monstrous to behold. It further contains within its very core an awesome supernatural element, setting the bearer apart from all others." Since Damien is an orphan on Earth, his survival means he has "accomplished something truly godlike". When Damien uses his powers, Iaccino says "they are typically accompanied by a fierceness and rage" that reflects the Jungian interpretation of "the primordial child's being depicted as an inhuman". Damien has a relationship with wild dogs that indicates "his mystical link with the barbaric world of the primitive". Iaccino says that Damien's life (in the original film) is spared because Damien "can appear angelic and pure to those around him while concealing his depraved nature", which is why his adoptive father hesitates to kill him. In Omen II, Iaccino notes Damien's relationship with the raven, which "is one of the devil's common guises" in fairy tales. When satanists help educate Damien "in the ways of evil", the growing boy becomes fully conscious of his true nature. Iaccino explains, "He is able to detach himself somewhat from the instinctual sphere of the beast (as well as the innocence of the child) to develop a stronger, more liberating identity." After Damien's realization, the raven no longer appears in the film, indicating that it has been "integrated into Damien's conscience". In Omen III: The Final Conflict, Damien is an adult with an empire that thrives "on the misfortunes of others". He lacks faith or trust in others and does not want to admit needing anyone to survive. When he questions the Christ replica, he is "the Jungian image of archaic man" who believes that any action "must produce a significant reaction in the world", which is why he forces the crown of thorns on the replica's head.

== See also ==
- List of fictional Antichrists
