= Nobody's Baby =

Nobody's Baby may refer to:

- Nobody's Baby (2001 film), a comedy film
- Nobody's Baby (1937 film), an American comedy film
