= The First Omen =

2024 film by Arkasha Stevenson

- Theatrical release poster
- Directed by: Arkasha Stevenson
- Screenplay by: Tim Smith; Arkasha Stevenson; Keith Thomas
- Story by: Ben Jacoby
- Based on: Characters by David Seltzer
- Produced by: David S. Goyer; Keith Levine
- Starring: Nell Tiger Free; Tawfeek Barhom; Sônia Braga; Ralph Ineson; Bill Nighy
- Cinematography: Aaron Morton
- Edited by: Bob Murawski; Amy E. Duddleston
- Music by: Mark Korven
- Production company: Phantom Four Films
- Distributed by: 20th Century Studios
- Release date: April 5, 2024
- Running time: 119 minutes
- Country: United States
- Language: English
- Budget: $30 million
- Box office: $54 million

The First Omen is a 2024 American supernatural horror film directed by Arkasha Stevenson (in her feature directorial debut), who co-wrote the screenplay with Tim Smith and Keith Thomas from a story by Ben Jacoby. It is a prequel to The Omen (1976), and the sixth overall film in The Omen franchise. It stars Nell Tiger Free, Tawfeek Barhom, Sônia Braga, Ralph Ineson, and Bill Nighy. The plot follows an American nun sent to work at a Catholic orphanage in Rome who uncovers a sinister conspiracy to bring about the birth of the Antichrist.

The First Omen was theatrically released in the United States by 20th Century Studios on April 5, 2024. The film received positive reviews from critics and grossed $54 million worldwide.

== Plot ==
In Rome, 1971, Father Brennan presses Father Harris about an occult conspiracy; Harris gives him a photograph of a baby with the name "Scianna" inscribed. Harris is killed when a pipe falls from a church construction scaffold and splits his head open.

Amid political protests, American novice nun Margaret Daino arrives at the Vizzardeli Orphanage. She meets Cardinal Lawrence, Father Gabriel, Abbess Silva, Sister Anjelica, and her roommate and fellow novice Luz. Luz invites Margaret to a disco, where they meet two men. Margaret dances with the man named Paolo before blacking out. She awakens the next day with no memory of what happened.

Margaret bonds with the mistreated orphan Carlita, who is plagued by disturbing visions. Father Brennan warns her about Carlita, saying "evil things" will happen. She spots Carlita showing Sister Anjelica a drawing of a pregnant woman being restrained; moments later, Sister Anjelica immolates and hangs herself.

Brennan explains that radicals within the Catholic Church, desperate to regain power against the rise of secularism, seek to bring about the birth of the Antichrist to create fear and drive rebellious disbelievers back to the Church, with Carlita intended to be his mother. During a field trip, a riot breaks out and Margaret experiences a demonic hallucination. Abbess Silva postpones Margaret's vows and orders her to distance herself from Carlita. She runs into Paolo; horrified, he tells her to "look for the mark" before being struck and killed by an oncoming truck.

In the Abbess's office, Margaret uncovers a hidden, underground chamber and a series of subject files, all labeled "Scianna". They contain photos of dysmorphic babies, all with a birthmark in the shape of three sixes, with Carlita as the only one to survive to adolescence. Margaret attempts to flee with Carlita, but is intercepted and spots the mark on Carlita's palate before being imprisoned.

Father Gabriel frees Margaret and they examine the stolen files with Father Brennan, discovering that another baby survived. Margaret locates the mark on her own scalp and suddenly remembers that she was forcefully impregnated in a satanic ritual the night she blacked out at the disco. They come to realize that the orphanage heads have determined that the Devil will need to mate with his own spawn in order to conceive the Antichrist, and Margaret had been brought to Rome as her half-sister Carlita was too young. They drive to a doctor who can abort the pregnancy, but another car crashes into theirs on the way, incapacitating everyone except Margaret, who staggers from the car as her body suddenly swells with pregnancy.

She awakens strapped to a hospital bed and is greeted by Cardinal Lawrence, the head of the conspiracy. The Cardinal and the other conspirators watch as she gives birth to two children via Caesarean section, a girl and a boy; the latter is hailed as the Antichrist. Luz and the man who was with Paolo at the disco are revealed to be among the conspirators. Margaret stabs Cardinal Lawrence, but cannot bring herself to kill her son. Luz stabs Margaret as the conspirators flee with the boy and set the chamber ablaze to cover their tracks. Carlita saves Margaret and her daughter; as they flee, Margaret sees a demonic jackal shrieking in the flames. The baby boy is given to American diplomat Robert Thorn to secretly replace the child his wife Katherine has supposedly miscarried. (Note: As depicted in The Omen (1976).)

Years later, Margaret lives in seclusion in the mountains with Carlita and her daughter, now a happy family. Brennan visits to warn that the conspirators will be hunting her and that her son has been named Damien.

== Cast ==
- Nell Tiger Free as Margaret, an American sent to Rome to work at an orphanage before taking the veil
- Ralph Ineson as Father Brennan, a priest who warns Margaret of a conspiracy within the church (Note: The character also appears in the 1976 film, where he is portrayed by Patrick Troughton.)
- Sônia Braga as Sister Silva, the Abbess of Vizzardeli Orphanage in Rome
- Tawfeek Barhom as Father Gabriel, a member of the Catholic clergy working at the orphanage
- Maria Caballero as Luz, Margaret's roommate at Vizzardeli
- Charles Dance as Father Harris, a priest
- Bill Nighy as Cardinal Lawrence, a senior member of the Catholic church
- Nicole Sorace as Carlita, an older child at Vizzardeli
- Ishtar Currie-Wilson as Sister Anjelica, a disturbed nun at Vizzardeli
- Andrea Arcangeli as Paolo, a man who encounters Margaret
- Anton Alexander as Father Spiletto, a priest who convinces American diplomat Robert Thorn to adopt Damien (Note: The character also appears in the 1976 film, where he is portrayed by Martin Benson.)
- Rachel Hurd-Wood as Katherine Thorn, the wife of Robert Thorn and the adoptive mother of Damien (Note: The character also appears in the 1976 film, where she is portrayed by Lee Remick.)
- Eva Ras as an angry nun

Gregory Peck, who died in 2003, reprises his role as Robert Thorn via archival photograph.

== Production ==
In April 2016, a prequel to The Omen (1976) was announced to be in the works at 20th Century Fox, with Ben Jacoby writing the script and Antonio Campos in talks to direct. By May 2022, three years after The Walt Disney Company acquired the Fox assets, 20th Century Studios began developing it, with Arkasha Stevenson signing on in her feature directorial debut. David S. Goyer and Keith Levine produced under their Phantom Four Films label. Nell Tiger Free was cast in the lead role in late August 2022. On January 3, 2024, Tawfeek Barhom, Sônia Braga, Ralph Ineson, and Bill Nighy were announced to star in the film.

Principal photography took place on location in Rome and on soundstages at Lumina Studios from September 19 to November 22, 2022. Buildings in Villa Parisi and a farm in Procoio was used to portray the orphanage. Production designer Eve Stewart stated, "We wanted it to be a very unique and beautiful building, and since we couldn't find everything within one building, we put three buildings together and made sure that they all linked well with one another". The basement was created on the soundstage.

Costume designer Paco Delgado wanted the costumes to have a gothic feeling. He designed light clothing that moves with the wind so it would match Stevenson's vision of "the figures sort of floating through the hallways". The girls at the orphanage were dressed in 1940s/1950s costumes, even though the film takes place in the 1970s; the crew wanted a "specific ambience". For Margaret's look, Delgado was inspired with Yves Saint Laurent fashion of the 1970s. Adrien Morot served as prosthetic and creature designer.

=== Music ===
The score was composed by Mark Korven, who wrote original music and referenced themes written by Jerry Goldsmith for the previous films, including "Ave Satani." The soundtrack album was released by Hollywood Records on April 5, 2024, the same day as the film.

== Release ==
A specific shot in the birthing sequence resulted in the Motion Picture Association registering the film with an NC-17 rating classification. Producer Keith Levine said, "We had to go back and forth with the ratings board five times. Weirdly, avoiding the NC-17 made it more intense". David S. Goyer commented that, "The movie, by its nature, deals with female body horror, and I do think there's a double standard. That was really interesting when we were negotiating with the ratings board. I think there is more permissiveness when dealing with male protagonists, particularly in body horror".

The First Omen was greenlit in development for an intended streaming release on Hulu, but was given a theatrical wide release after Walt Disney Studios Motion Pictures determined it needed to expand the studio's theatrical release slate after shortages caused by the 2023 Hollywood labor disputes. The film was theatrically released by 20th Century Studios on April 5, 2024.

=== Home media ===
The First Omen was released on digital platforms on May 28, 2024, and for streaming on Hulu two days later. It was released on Blu-ray and DVD on July 30, 2024, by Sony Pictures Home Entertainment, as the first Disney-owned title to be released as part of a home video distribution agreement between Disney and Sony that began in February 2024, in which Sony handles all physical media production and distribution for Disney's home entertainment assets in North America, but will remain using their respective labels.

Nielsen Media Research, which records streaming viewership on U.S. television screens, calculated that The First Omen was watched for 182 million minutes from May 27 to June 2, 2024, making it the tenth most-streamed film of the week. The streaming aggregator Reelgood, which monitors real-time data from 20 million users in the U.S. for original and acquired streaming programs and movies across subscription video-on-demand (SVOD) and ad-supported video-on-demand (AVOD) services, reported that The First Omen was third most-streamed film from May 30 to June 5. JustWatch, a guide to streaming content with access to data from more than 20 million users around the world, announced that The First Omen was the fifth most-streamed film in the U.S. from June 3 to June 9. According to the file-sharing news website TorrentFreak, The First Omen was the seventh most-pirated film for the week ending June 3.

== Reception ==
=== Box office ===
The First Omen grossed $20.1 million in the United States and Canada, and $33.9 million in other territories, for a worldwide total of $54 million.

In the United States and Canada, The First Omen was released alongside Monkey Man, and was initially projected to gross $14–15 million from 3,375 theaters in its opening weekend. After making $3.2 million on its first day (including $725,000 from Thursday night previews), estimates were lowered to $8 million. It went on to debut $8.4 million, finishing fourth at the box office. In its second weekend the film made $3.8 million, finishing in seventh.

=== Critical response ===
On the review aggregator website Rotten Tomatoes, 83% of 193 critics' reviews are positive, with an average rating of 7/10. The website's consensus reads: "Frequently frightening even as it plays within the confines of a nearly 50-year-old film series, this prequel is The First Omen of a bright future for the franchise in quite some time." Metacritic, which uses a weighted average, assigned the film a score of 65 out of 100, based on 33 critics, indicating "generally favorable" reviews. Audiences polled by CinemaScore gave the film an average grade of "C" on an A+ to F scale.

Kyle Turner of Slant Magazine gave it 3/4 stars, writing, "Throughout the film, Stevenson slides easily between earthly delights and disgusts, wedding them together through viscera and audacious aesthetics. In The First Omen, Stevenson atomizes all the darkness and the light within ourselves." The Guardian's Benjamin Lee gave it 3/5 stars, calling it "far more artful and striking than it has any right to be, thanks in overwhelmingly large part to the TV director Arkasha Stevenson, whose bravado works incredibly well until it really doesn't, when she's forced to play by franchise rules rather than her own." Writing for The Times, Ed Potton gave it 3/5 stars. He said, "Stevenson leans too heavily on the old horror staple of female hysteria and the explanation behind the plot to spawn a tiny Antichrist is the kind of thing you'd expect from a conspiracy nutjob on YouTube. Tiger Free makes a compellingly unstable heroine, though, and Bill Nighy and Charles Dance pop up as senior priests and wear their cassocks well... This is Call the Midwife directed by Satan."

The Wall Street Journal's Kyle Smith wrote, "The First Omen may have a noble predecessor in one of the scariest films of the 1970s, but it has little to distinguish it from the last 665 mediocre horror features I've seen." Tim Robey of The Daily Telegraph gave it 2/5 stars, writing, "Stevenson has configured her tale as female body-horror fit for a dissertation, without giving it much of a spine: while slick, the set pieces are few, far between, and over too fast." Frank Scheck of The Hollywood Reporter wrote, "Ultimately, it all feels very familiar, and not just because this is the second movie in as many months to revolve around nuns and the birth of an Antichrist."

=== Comparisons to Immaculate ===
Due to sharing similar premises and a common Italian setting and released at about the same time, The First Omen and Immaculate have been dubbed as twin films. Both films explore the issue of female bodily autonomy, depicting the "systemic control of women's bodies reduced to vessels". Bilge Ebiri of Vulture wondered about "why should anyone be surprised that suddenly, in the wake of the Supreme Court's overturning of Roe v. Wade, as state after state attempts to enact religious laws depriving women of bodily agency, America is getting horror movies about people forced into monstrous births by religious institutions worried about their growing irrelevance". They are both considered as nunsploitation films.

=== Accolades ===
The First Omen was nominated for Best Horror Film at the 52nd Saturn Awards, but lost to Alien: Romulus, another film from 20th Century Studios.

Maria Caballero received a nomination for Best Actress in an International Production at the 33rd Actors and Actresses Union Awards for her role in the film.

Award	Date of ceremony	Category	Recipient(s)	Result	Ref.
Golden Trailer Awards	May 30, 2024	Best Horror	"Child"	Shortlisted	
Golden Trailer Awards	May 30, 2024	Most Original Trailer	"Fear"	Shortlisted	
Golden Trailer Awards	May 30, 2024	Best Horror/Thriller TrailerByte for a Feature Film	"Callback"	Shortlisted	
Fangoria Chainsaw Awards	October 13, 2024	Best Wide Release Movie		Shortlisted	
Fangoria Chainsaw Awards	October 13, 2024	Best Lead Performance	Nell Tiger Free	Shortlisted	
Fangoria Chainsaw Awards	October 13, 2024	Best Director	Arkasha Stevenson	Shortlisted	
Fangoria Chainsaw Awards	October 13, 2024	Best Screenplay	Arkasha Stevenson, Tim Smith and Keith Thomas	Shortlisted	
Fangoria Chainsaw Awards	October 13, 2024	Best Cinematography	Aaron Morton	Shortlisted	
Fangoria Chainsaw Awards	October 13, 2024	Best Costume Design	Paco Delgado	Shortlisted	
Fangoria Chainsaw Awards	October 13, 2024	Best Score	Mark Korven	Shortlisted	
San Diego Film Critics Society Awards	December 9, 2024	Breakthrough Actor	Nell Tiger Free	Runner-up	
Taurus World Stunt Awards	May 11, 2025	Best Overall Stunt by a Stunt Woman	Lucy Johnson	Won	
Saturn Awards	February 2, 2025	Best Horror Film		Nominated	
Actors and Actresses Union Awards	March 10, 2025	Best Actress in an International Production	Maria Caballero	Nominated	
Golden Trailer Awards	May 29, 2025	Best Wildposts (Teaser Campaign)	"Woman, Baby, Satan"	Won	

== Possible sequel ==
Arkasha Stevenson discussed ideas for a sequel in an interview saying, "I'm very interested in the jackal, where he came from. I'm interested in delving into that with the Church conspiracy. I'm interested in where Margaret and the children go from here. What's the future of Layla, Damien's sister? I could talk about it for hours".
