= List of fictional Antichrists =

Antichrist characters have been the continuing subject of speculation and attraction, often explored in fiction and media, and the character has developed its own fictional mythology apart from biblical scripture. For example, the Book of Revelation does not say the Antichrist will be the son of Satan (it does not even mention him), but the idea was made popular in at least two movies, The Omen, and its sequels, with the evil child, Damien, who grows up with the destiny to rule and destroy the world, and Rosemary's Baby with her son, Adrian.

In fact, the uses of the term "antichrist" or "antichrists" in the Johannine epistles (1 John 2:18; 4:2–3; 2 John 1:17; 2:22) do not clearly present a single latter-day individual Antichrist. The articles "the deceiver" or "the antichrist" are usually seen as marking out a certain category of persons, rather than an individual.

Consequently, attention has been placed on 2 Thessalonians 2 (1–4, 7–10) to identify information about an Antichrist, although the term "antichrist" does not occur here. Although the word "antichrist" (Greek antikhristos) is used only in the Epistles of John, the similar word "pseudochrist" (Greek pseudokhristos, meaning "false messiah") is used by Jesus in the Gospels (Mark 13:22; Matthew 24:24).

== Portrayals ==
Antichrist characters portrayed in fiction and nonfiction include:

- Damien Thorn from The Omen series. This movie was influential in that, in many of the "Anti-Christian" movies that followed, it was naturally assumed that the Antichrist would be Satan's "begotten" son.
- Adrian from the film Rosemary's Baby.
- The talking ape Shift in C. S. Lewis' The Last Battle, the final book in The Chronicles of Narnia series
- A nameless leader that assumes the reinstituted office of Roman Emperor, in the 1900 apocalyptic short-story The Tale of Anti-Christ by Vladimir Solovyov
- Adam Young from Neil Gaiman and Terry Pratchett's novel and TV series Good Omens
- Jesse, a human/demon hybrid in the Supernatural episode I Believe the Children Are Our Future, is confirmed as the Antichrist by the angel Castiel. Unlike most personifications of the Antichrist, Jesse is neutrally aligned, able to be deterred from his "destined" path when Sam Winchester tells him the whole truth about his origins and capabilities.
- The Guaranteed Eternal Sanctuary Man from Supper's Ready, a song by prog rock band Genesis
- Stone Alexander (played by Michael York) in the films The Omega Code, and Megiddo: The Omega Code 2.
- Nicolae Carpathia from the Christian book series Left Behind.
- Brother Bartholomew from Salem Kirban's 1970 novel, 666.
- Angel Caine, played by Simon Ward, in the film Holocaust 2000 (aka The Chosen).
- The animal Antichrist in the South Park episode “Woodland Critter Christmas", though at the end of this episode it is revealed that he was only part of a story made up by Cartman
- Damien from the South Park episode "Damien"
- Adolf Hitler, in Robert Van Kampen's novel The Fourth Reich. Hitler's spirit is released from Hell and enters an embryo created from his cloned DNA. He is then born in Russia and grows up to become that country's dictator, eventually revealing his true identity to the world before the UN General Assembly. Van Kampen also stated that Hitler "best meets all requirements to be the Antichrist" in his former book, The Sign.
- Joey Atkins from Strange. He is the son of the demon Azal and is destined to take on his father's role.
- 'Pepito' from the comic series Squee!
- Quinn Dexter from Peter F. Hamilton's The Night's Dawn Trilogy. He is an avowed Satanist who tries to bring God's brother (Satan) into the world to destroy all life in the universe.
- The demon Agares, from The Day After Judgement by James Blish
- Julian Felsenburgh in Lord of the World by Robert Hugh Benson
- The European President in Father Elijah: An Apocalypse and its sequel Elijah in Jerusalem by Michael D. O'Brien
- Christina in the 2005 TV series Point Pleasant
- Franco Macalusso from the Apocalypse (film series) by Cloud Ten Pictures
- The titular character (occasionally referred to as Adam Kadmon) of the Marilyn Manson album Antichrist Superstar
- Professional Wrestler, Jeff Hardy, during his TNA (Total Nonstop Action Wrestling) run in 2010–2011, as his persona was known with the nickname « The Antichrist of Professional Wrestling. »
- Santa Claus from Santa's Slay
- Danny Wormwood from the comic series Chronicles of Wormwood, a uniquely benevolent Antichrist
- Lucy, from House in the Cerulean Sea by TJ Klune.
- Christopher Goodman from the Christ Clone Trilogy by James BeauSeigneur
- Lucy, from Lucy, the Daughter of the Devil
- The Priest's assistant in "The Serpentine Offering" video clip from the album In Sorte Diaboli by Dimmu Borgir
- Iscarius Alchemy, a resurrected Judas Iscariot in Matthew Dickens' Shekinah Chronicles series, published by Destiny Image.
- Azul Dante in the Prodigal Project book series written by Ken Abrham and Daniel Hart.
- Baal in the novel Baal by Robert R. McCammon
- Immanuel Bernstate in Jonathan R. Cash's novel The Age of the Antichrist.
- Sir Richard Grant Morrison in the novel We All Fall Down by Brian Caldwell
- Chaos, the King of the Old Ones, from several of H.P. Lovecraft's short stories.
- Set Abominae from the Something Wicked Saga
- Woland from Mihail Bulgakov's The Master and Margarita
- Mason Wolfe in the novel The Last Fisherman by Randy England
- Emmanuel Lewis is described as the Antichrist in the 1996 Bloodhound Gang song "Fire Water Burn", and it is presumed he will keep the singer company in Hell, along with several dead celebrities.
- Laura Goodman, half-sister of the main character Betsy Taylor, in the paranormal romance Undead series by MaryJanice Davidson
- In Gore Vidal's 1954 dystopian novel Messiah, a new death-worshipping religion sweeps the world, completely displacing and destroying Christianity. After their victory, the new religion's adherents declare their Prophet to have been the Antichrist.
- Michael Langdon from American Horror Story (season 1 Murder House and season 8 Apocalypse); he is the result of Tate Langdon raping Vivien Harmon as a ghost, when she was still a human, and is therefore believed to be the antichrist.
- The seventeenth-century painter Christoph Haizmann is depicted as an Antichrist in the 2003 horror mockumentary Searching for Haizmann by Scott Gordon & Ron Meyer
- Harry Potter in Alan Moore's The League of Extraordinary Gentlemen, Volume III: Century. In this universe he is brought about by the Invisible College, a cult of magicians led by Oliver Haddo, as the moonchild destined to bring the apocalypse. All his exploits were in fact orchestrated by the college (Haddo acting as Lord Voldemort).
- The Swedish band Ghost makes portrayals of the birth of the Antichrist and his life on their two full-length albums.
- Malachi in the 2005 UK Hex TV series
- Anung Un Rama, also known as Hellboy, is a popular comic book and motion picture protagonist who is the son of the Devil. Despite being destined as an Antichrist figure, given an oversized right hand of stone which is to act as the key to unleash great evil upon the world, Hellboy has foresworn this burden, and instead fights to protect the world from evil and darkness.
- Earl Grundy, a politician who begins calling himself The Beast (Revelation), in Rapture-Palooza
- Amy Calder (Madison Dellamea) from The Messengers
- Lucius Wagner in the "Lucius" video game trilogy.
- Anghela Sta. Ana or "NgaHela" in 2016 Filipino horror movie Seklusyon
- Charlie from Hazbin Hotel is the daughter of Lucifer and Lilith, and the princess of Hell.
- Aion in the Chrono Crusade 1998 manga and 2003 anime.
- Sabrina Spellman in the Netflix series Chilling Adventures of Sabrina is the daughter of Lucifer and is prophesied to bring about the apocalypse by performing satanic perversions of the miracles Jesus performed
- Lucas from 2017 horror comedy film Little Evil who is the son of Samantha and step-son of Gary Bloom, born on June 6 (6/6). A Satanist group plans to sacrifice him on his 6th birthday to open the gates of hell so the devil can possess him to commence the end of the world.
- Ricardo Montana from the Brazilian telenovela Apocalipse produced by Casablanca and Record TV, based on the Book of Revelation. Ricardo is played by Brazilian actor Sérgio Marone.
- Bishop Uriah Leonard/Pope Sixtus VI in The Seven Last Years (1978) by Carol Balizet
- Antiochus IV Epiphanes (resurrected by Satan) in Titan, Son of Saturn (1905) by Joseph Birbeck Burroughs
- Chrissy from the animated comedy TV series Little Demon
- Lucien Apleon from the novel The Mark of the Beast (1918) by Sidney Watson
