= Punchline (film) =

1988 film by David Seltzer

- Theatrical poster
- Directed by: David Seltzer
- Written by: David Seltzer
- Produced by: Daniel Melnick; Michael I. Rachmil
- Starring: Sally Field; Tom Hanks; John Goodman; Mark Rydell
- Cinematography: Reynaldo Villalobos
- Edited by: Bruce Green
- Music by: Gary Anderson; Charles Gross
- Production company: Columbia Pictures
- Distributed by: Columbia Pictures
- Release date: October 7, 1988
- Running time: 122 minutes
- Country: United States
- Language: English
- Budget: $15 million
- Box office: $21 million (US/Canada)

Punchline is a 1988 American comedy-drama film written and directed by David Seltzer and distributed by Columbia Pictures. Its story follows Steven Gold, a talented young comic, as he helps housewife Lilah Krytsick who wants to break into stand-up comedy. It stars Sally Field, Tom Hanks, John Goodman and Mark Rydell.

The film was produced by Daniel Melnick and Michael I. Rachmil and was released on October 7, 1988. It grossed $21.0 million in the United States and Canada, against a budget of $15 million. It received generally mixed reviews and has a 57% approval rating based on 21 votes on Rotten Tomatoes.

== Plot ==
Steven Gold is a struggling medical student who moonlights successfully as a stand-up comedian. When he is given a chance at the big time, he cracks under the pressure. He encounters Lilah Krytsick on the comedy circuit. She is a dedicated housewife who has raw talent but not the command of the craft Steven possesses. Steven initially ignores Lilah but after his performance is derailed by the unexpected appearance of his father and brother, both medical professionals, her support wins Steven's affection. He teaches her the fundamentals of stand-up comedy.

Steven teaches Lilah to connect with the audience by openly discussing the humor of her everyday life. An uneasy friendship develops as they reveal their largest stumbling blocks: Steven's need for success and Lilah's devotion to her family. Steven develops an unwanted romantic attraction to Lilah and his mental health suffers after she rejects him.

Stevan and Lilah compete at the Gas Station comedy club in front of a panel of television executives, who promise the winner a prime time television opportunity and possible stardom. As the comics compete on stage, they also reveal many of the conflicts driving them. As the judges' final tally is revealed, Lilah withdraws "in case the winner is me," choosing her family over success. She leaves before the club owner reveals she was in fact the winner. Lilah's husband John is impressed by her stand-up and suggests ideas for her next set. They walk away arm in arm reminiscing about how funny they find their children. Steven is declared the winner of the show.

== Cast ==
- Sally Field as Lilah Krytsick
- Tom Hanks as Steven Gold
- John Goodman as John Krytsick
- Mark Rydell as Romeo
- Kim Greist as Madeline Urie
- Paul Mazursky as Arnold
- Taylor Negron as Albert Emperato
- Ángel Salazar as Rico
- Damon Wayans as Percy
- Max Alexander as Mister Ball
- Barry Sobel as Robyn Green
- Marty Pollio as Juggler
- Katie Rich as Eve
- Casey Sander as Ernie
- Candace Cameron as Carrie Krytsick
- George Wallace as Arm Cast Man
- Randy Fechter as Doctor
- Cameron Thor as Audience Member
- Bob Zmuda as Audience Member
- Dottie Archibald as Mrs. Ball
- Susie Essman as Hairdresser
- Jimmy Brogan as Clergyman
- George D. Wallace as Dr. Wishniak
- Mike Starr as Man with Bullhorn

== Production ==
David Seltzer wrote the first draft for Punchline in 1979 after becoming fascinated by comedy clubs while looking for someone to play a psychiatrist on a television pilot that he was writing. He had a development deal with the movie division of ABC. Originally, the tone of the film was more good-natured a la Fame (1980) with more characters and less of an emphasis on Steven Gold. Bob Bookman, an executive, sponsored the script but left for Columbia Pictures. He bought the screenplay because Howard Zieff was interested in directing it. When Zieff lost interest (he ended up doing Unfaithfully Yours in 1984), the script was buried for years.

In 1986, producer Daniel Melnick found the screenplay for Punchline among twelve other unrealized scripts in the vaults of Columbia Pictures. Seltzer's screenplay had gone through three changes of studio management because the executives didn't like the mix of comedy and drama as well as the Steven Gold character because they thought he was, according to Melnick, "obsessive, certainly self-destructive and could be considered mean-spirited." The studio couldn't get a major star to commit to the material and so Melnick decided to make the movie for $8 million and with no stars. Interim studio president Steve Sohmer didn't like that idea and sent the script to Sally Field, who had a production deal with Columbia. Field agreed to star in and produce the movie. Once Field signed on, the budget was set at $15 million.

Field didn't mind sharing the majority of the screen time with Tom Hanks and taking on the role of producer because, as she said in an interview at the time, "as a producer I am not developing films in which I can do fancy footwork. I don't have to have the tour de force part." New York comic Susie Essman and sitcom writer Dottie Archibald coached Field. Archibald also served as comedy consultant for the movie, recruiting fifteen comics to populate the comedy club Steven (Hanks) and Lilah Krytsick (Field) frequent. Field's research often mirrored her character's as she remembers working "for about six months to find where Lilah's comedy was, which is what my character was going through. So it was actually happening to both of us."

Two months before Punchline went into production, Hanks wrote a five-minute stand-up act and performed it at the Comedy Store in Los Angeles. As Hanks recalls, "it was pure flop sweat time, an embarrassment. That material lasted 1 minute 40 seconds, and it had no theme." Hanks tried again and again, sometimes hitting three clubs a night. It took a month before the actor "didn't sweat like a pig" on stage. By that point, he had enlisted an old friend and comedy writer Randy Fechter and stand-up comic Barry Sobel to help him write his routine. Hanks ended up performing more than thirty times in clubs in Los Angeles and New York City.

Chairman of Columbia David Puttnam wanted to release Punchline during Christmas 1987, but the film wasn't ready. Puttnam eventually left and Dawn Steel moved in and decided to release the film after Big (1988) became a huge hit.

== Reception ==
The film received mixed reviews from critics. It has a rating of 57% on Rotten Tomatoes, based on 21 reviews. Variety wrote that "Hanks is the real reason to see the film and those who enjoyed watching him in Big will find a different, more realized comedian." Roger Ebert wrote that it "makes the fatal mistake of taking stand-up seriously. And if you’re gonna do that, you’d better have good material." One review in The Washington Post read that it "commits the unforgivable sin – it's a movie about comedy that's not funny." Another review in the same newspaper declared that "Seltzer has certainly redeemed his past (ever catch that Six Weeks thing between Dudley Moore and Mary Tyler Moore, or the Jon Voight Table for Five?). He should just avoid projects where you have to use the word 'bittersweet' – and grab at any others that star Tom Hanks."

The film opened on 4 screens in New York City, Los Angeles, Chicago and Toronto and grossed an impressive $160,742 during its opening weekend. It went on to gross $21 million in the United States and Canada.

== See also ==
- Comedians (play)
