= Anton Alexander (actor) =

British actor

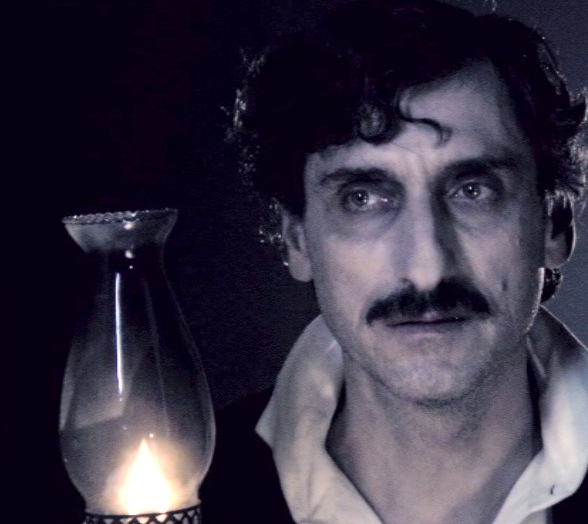
- Alexander as Edgar Allan Poe in The Novel
- Born: London, England
- Citizenship: United Kingdom
- Education: Bristol Old Vic Theatre School
- Occupation: Actor
- Years active: 1985–present

Anton Alexander is an English actor, based in London and Rome.<refname=":0"/>

== Biography ==
Alexander was born in London to Greek Cypriot parents. He graduated from the Bristol Old Vic Theatre School in 1983. He is fluent in English, Greek, and Italian.

Alexander was the recipient of the Best Actor award for The Novel at the NYLA International Film Awards 2013.

His TV and film appearances include EastEnders, The Adventures of Sherlock Holmes (The Greek Interpreter), King David and Cemetery Man - a cult Italian horror film starring Rupert Everett, and hailed by Martin Scorsese as one of the best Italian films of the 1990s. He played Hirah in the Emmy Award-winning TV film, Joseph and Kim Roosevelt in the TV mini series Soraya. He worked with Sir Ridley Scott twice in 2013, playing the machiavellian Roccagiovine in The Vatican and the Hebrew spy Dathan in Exodus: Gods and Kings.

== Selected filmography ==
- ‘’Nobody’s Diary’’ (film)-2026 as Professor Edward Godwin
- ‘’Naples to New York’’ (film-2025) as Peter Sangiuliano(Defense Attorney)
- ‘’The First Omen’’ (film)(2024) as Father Spiletto
- ‘’Leonardo’’ TV Series (2021) as Prior Vincenzo
- ‘’Devils’’ TV Series (2020) as Alfred Warwick FT
- Gore (2018) as the Reporter
- Taboo (2017) as Code Duello
- Exodus: Gods and Kings (2015) as Dathan
- The Vatican (2013) as Urbano Roccagiovine
- The Best Offer (2013) as Real Estate Agent
- Romeo and Juliet (2013) as Abraham
- The Novel (2011) as Edgar Allan Poe
- The Power of Three (2011) as Nigel
- Gli occhi dell'altro (2005) as Nick Forbes
- Soraya (2003) as Kim Roosevelt
- Ferrari (2003) as lawyer to Enzo Ferrari
- The Devil and Ms. D (1999) as Air Force Officer
- Joseph (1995) as Hirah
- Cemetery Man (Dellamorte Dellamore) (1994) as Franco
- EastEnders (1990) as accountant to Ian Beale
- The Adventures of Sherlock Holmes (1985) as Paul Kratides
- King David (1985) as Runner
