= Graham Baker (director) =

English director

- Born: c. 1938; England
- Occupation: Film director
- Notable work: Alien Nation

Graham Baker (born c. 1938) is an English film director. He directed a number of Hollywood feature films from 1981 to 1999, including the 1988 science fiction film Alien Nation.

Baker studied painting, graphic design, and architecture at Leicester College. His first film was the short film Leaving Lily (1975), which was nominated for a BAFTA Award. He has also directed television commercials, such as Isuzu's series of "Joe Isuzu" advertisements in the 1980s. In 2008 Baker wrote the musical play Ipso Facto or The Rake's Return, with songs by Neil Innes.

== Filmography ==
- Leaving Lily (short film) (1975)
- Omen III: The Final Conflict (1981)
- Impulse (1984)
- Alien Nation (1988)
- The Recruit (1990)
- Born to Ride (1991)
- Beowulf (1999)
- With Love From... Suffolk (2016) (co-director)
