= Harvey Bernhard =

American film producer

- Born: March 5, 1924; Seattle, Washington, U.S.
- Died: January 16, 2014 (aged 89); Kirkland, Washington, U.S.
- Occupation: Film producer
- Spouse: Lillian Vera Kramer

Harvey Bernhard (March 5, 1924 – January 16, 2014) was an American film producer. He frequently collaborated with film director Richard Donner, notably on The Omen (1976), The Goonies (1985) and The Lost Boys (1987)

== Early life and education ==
Bernhard was born on March 5, 1924, in Seattle to Moe Bernhard and Rose Minnie Cohn. He had two sisters, Selma and Inez. He served as a U.S. Navy officer in World War II, and graduated from Stanford University in 1947.

== Career ==
He was an active participant in the rapidly growing Las Vegas entertainment industry in the 1950s, and then moved to Hollywood to pioneer in the production of early television documentaries with Sandy Howard, David Wolper and Metromedia Producers Corporation before becoming an independent movie producer. His motion picture credits as producer include, The Mack (1973), The Omen (1976), The Goonies (1985), The Lost Boys (1987) and executive producer of Ladyhawke (1985).

== Personal life and death ==
Bernhard was married to Lillian Vera Kramer from June 23, 1962, until her death. Their sons are Robert Brown and Craig Allen Bernhard. Bernhard was Jewish.

Bernhard died on January 16, 2014, in Kirkland, Washington. He was 89.

== Partial filmography ==
As producer, unless otherwise noted.

- The Mack (1973)
- Thomasine & Bushrod (1974)
- The Omen (1976)
- Damien - Omen II (1978) (also screenwriter)
- Omen III: The Final Conflict (1981)
- The Beast Within (1982)
- Ladyhawke (1985)
- The Goonies (1985)
- The Lost Boys (1987)
- Omen IV: The Awakening (1991, made for TV) (also screenwriter)
