= Nobody's Baby (2001 film) =

2001 comedy film by David Seltzer

- Directed by: David Seltzer
- Written by: David Seltzer
- Produced by: Boaz Davidson; Harvey Kahn; Shanit Keter; Gary Oldman; John Thompson; Douglas Urbanski
- Starring: Gary Oldman; Skeet Ulrich; Radha Mitchell; Gordon Tootoosis; Anna Gunn; Peter Greene; Mary Steenburgen
- Cinematography: Christopher Taylor
- Edited by: Hughes Winborne
- Music by: Joseph Vitarelli
- Production companies: Millennium Films; SE8 Group; Front Street Pictures
- Distributed by: Artisan Entertainment
- Release date: January 21, 2001 (Sundance Film Festival)
- Running time: 112 minutes
- Country: United States
- Language: English

Nobody's Baby is a 2001 American independent black comedy crime film written and directed by David Seltzer. The film stars Gary Oldman and Skeet Ulrich as two redneck brothers who rescue a baby from a car accident and struggle to find its guardians after breaking out of prison and going on the run across the Southwestern United States.

== Plot ==
In North Carolina, Billy Radeen becomes an orphan as a toddler after his father is killed in an accidental shooting from his shotgun. His older inbred brother Buford Bill raises him, and the two commit crimes in their youth. Later in New Mexico, they are caught by law enforcement burglarizing a post office while intoxicated.

In court, a judge orders them to be separated or face severe jail time. The two are split up by a prison van escape, with police chasing after the van with Buford inside, and completely ignoring Billy. On a desert highway in Arizona, Billy attempts to receive a ride from a couple in a station wagon, who offers him a ride if he can fix their luggage rack. After doing so, the couple drive off. Later on, he instead gets a ride on the back of box truck and encounters the same couple from before. He moons them in retaliation, which causes the driver to get into a road rage and crash the station wagon into the side of a tunnel.

Billy gets off the truck and attempts to rescue them before discovering the couple are already dead. However, he finds and rescues a baby girl in the backseat before the car is engulfed in flames. Feeling remorseful, Billy decides to keep it though he knows next to nothing about caring for an infant. He stops at a truck stop where he meets waitress Shauna Louise, who takes him back to her trailer park in Henderson, Nevada, where he stays in an abandoned trailer. At the trailer park, he gets aid with the baby from Shauna's neighbor Estelle. When Buford tracks Billy down, he sees the baby as a monetary potential. However, Billy and Shauna Louise have grown attached to the child and they are not willing to give her up.

== Cast ==
- Skeet Ulrich as Billy Raedeen,
- Gary Oldman as Buford Bill, Billy's older inbred brother
- Radha Mitchell as Shauna Louise, a truck stop waitress, Vern's girlfriend, and Billy's love interest
- Mary Steenburgen as Estelle
- Gordon Tootoosis as Dog Havasu
- Anna Gunn as Stormy
- Peter Greene as Vern, Shauna Louise's abusive boyfriend
- Matthew Modine as Sonny, a wealthy man rancher who Estelle had an affair with
- Ed O'Neill as Norman Pinkney

== Release ==
Following its premiere at the 2001 Sundance Film Festival, the film was not released theatrically. It received a USA home video release on August 20, 2002.

== Reception ==
Geoffrey Gilmore, director of the Sundance Film Festival, called the film "a pure delight from start to finish":

If you were impressed watching Oldman play a congressman, wait until you see him do comedy and line dance! With terrific turns by Mary Steenburgen and Radha Mitchell, Utah scenery, hilarious dialogue, and the best joke in a film this side of Something About Mary, Nobody's Baby is a wonderfully entertaining odyssey that should bring Seltzer nothing but accolades.

Variety, reviewing the film after its premiere at Sundance on January 21, 2001, described it as "aim[ing] somewhere between Dumb and Dumber and Three Men and a Baby. The review stated that the film's "witless script wrings few laughs from its retread conceits...What's most toxic, however, is having to watch these actors sweat for their paychecks. Oldman vanishes into mutton chops and Walter Brennan mannerisms, gamely making an idiot of himself, to absolutely no humorous result....Steenburgen, Greene and O'Neill are allowed to be little more than unpleasant; Matthew Modine surfaces in a nothing role. Twinkling amidst the cow pies, Ulrich clearly relishes playing dum-dum, and his disarming sweetness lends the film whatever fleeting conviction it can claim."

Review aggregator Rotten Tomatoes records a 0% approval rating and a 3.95/10 average score, based on six reviews.
