= Seamus Davey-Fitzpatrick =

American actor (born 1998)

- Born: Seamus Liam Davey-Fitzpatrick; December 29, 1998 (age 27); New York City, New York, U.S.
- Occupation: Actor
- Years active: 2003–present

Seamus Liam Davey-Fitzpatrick (born December 29, 1998) is an American actor. His first feature film role was as Damien Thorn in the 2006 remake of the horror film The Omen.

== Personal life ==
Davey-Fitzpatrick was born in New York City, and moved with his family to East Stroudsburg, Pennsylvania, where he was raised. He is of Irish descent. His parents are James Hugh Fitzpatrick, an actor and model, and Marty Davey, an actress. He began acting in commercials for Marriott and Flintstone vitamins, and briefly appeared in an episode of the television series Sex and the City.

== Career ==
During the filming of The Omen, Davey-Fitzpatrick was never told that his character was supposed to be the son of the Devil; co-star Julia Stiles has commented that it was because the filmmakers thought "he was too young to understand it".

Davey-Fitzpatrick once acted, along with his parents, in a local short film The Lottery, an eleven-minute adaptation of Shirley Jackson's short story. He played Will Winslow on Guiding Light before the series' cancellation, and worked with Robert De Niro in Everybody's Fine, a film released in 2009. He has appeared in such television series as Law & Order, Sex and the City, Damages, The Black Donnellys, and Person of Interest. He played the 14-year-old son of Jesse (played by Ethan Hawke) in the feature film Before Midnight (2013).

== Filmography ==
=== Film ===
Year	Film	Role	Notes
2003	The Paper Mache Chase	William	Short film debut
2006	The Omen	Damien Thorn	Feature film debut
2007	The Lottery	Davy Hutchinson	Short film
2008	Oh My Captain!	Andrew	Short film
2009	Everybody's Fine	Young Robert	
2011	The Key Man	Sam	
2012	Moonrise Kingdom	Roosevelt	
2013	Before Midnight	Hank	
2013	Illness	Autistic Boy	
2013	Northern Borders	Austin Kitteridge III	
2013	Wish You Well	Diamond	
2014	The Longest Week	Young Conrad	
2015	Pawn Sacrifice	Teen Bobby Fischer	
2015	After School	Jack	Short film
2015	No Letting Go	Kyle (14 yrs)	
2017	The Dinner	Rick Lohman	
2019	Haunted Houses	Him	Short film
2020	Overcome	John Spokane	Short film
2020	The Elephant in the Room	Liam	Short film

=== Television ===
Year	Film	Role	Notes
2003	Sex and the City	Singing Toddler	Episode: A Woman's Right to Shoes
2006	Law & Order: Criminal Intent	Henry Copeland	Episode: Bedfellows
2007	The Black Donnellys	Matthew	5 episodes
2007–2008	Guiding Light	Will Winslow	45 episodes
2010	Damages	Kevin Tobin	4 episodes
2011	Lights Out	Dylan	7 episodes
2011	Person of Interest	Samuel Gates Jr.	Episode: Judgement
2007–2013	Law & Order: Special Victims Unit	Wayne Randolph * Tommy Truex	2 episodes
2017	Bull	Sam Whalen	Episode: A Business of Favors
2018	Blue Bloods	Trevor Thompson	Episode: Tale of Two Cities
