= Jonathan Scott-Taylor =

English actor (born 1962)

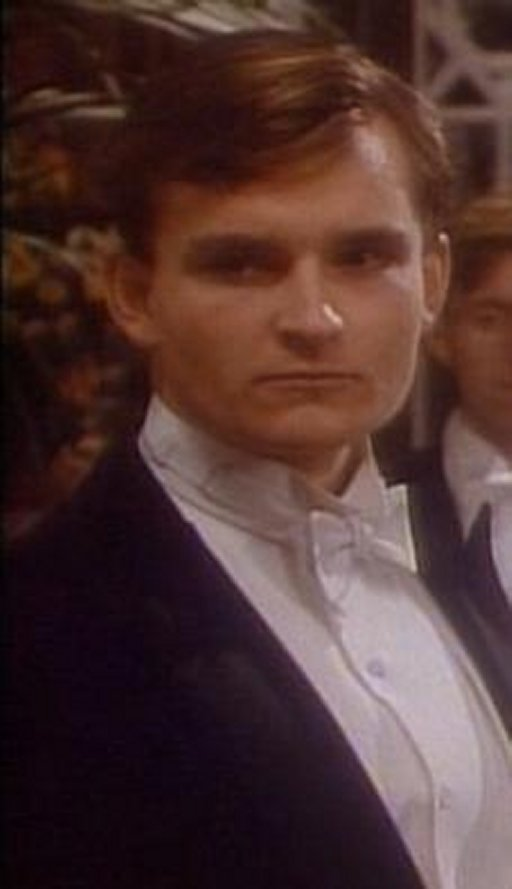
- Born: 6 March 1962 (age 64); São Paulo, Brazil
- Education: Haberdashers' Aske's Boys' School
- Occupation: Actor
- Years active: 1973–1988

Jonathan Scott-Taylor (born 6 March 1962) is an English actor, perhaps best known for his portrayal of the title role in the 1978 supernatural horror film Damien: Omen II.

Other credits include Tales of the Unexpected (1980), episode "Galloping Foxley", The Mill on the Floss (1978–1979), Triangle (1982-1983), Shadey (1985), and Troubles (1988)

== Early life ==
He was born 6 March 1962 in São Paulo, Brazil to English parents; his father was a consultant for the fishery industry in Brazil at the time. His family moved back to England when he was five years old. He was educated at Haberdashers' Aske's Boys' School, Elstree. Scott-Taylor started going to drama school at age 11.

== Acting career ==
He played the character of Jim Hawkins in a stage musical of Treasure Island in 1973. He went on to take minor roles in Bugsy Malone (1976) and The Four Feathers (1978), and a starring role in a BBC production of The Winslow Boy (1977). A Casting director watched him perform alongside Glenda Jackson in The White Devil at The Old Vic, after which he was chosen to play teen Damien Thorn in Damien: Omen II (1978).

In 1979, he played the role of Lucius, Brutus' servant, in a BBC production of Shakespeare's The Tragedy of Julius Caesar.

Following Omen II, he had a few more roles in Tales of the Unexpected (1980), as sadistic prep school bully Bruce "Galloping" Foxley in the episode "Galloping Foxley", as Tom Tulliver in The Mill on the Floss (1978–1979), the 1980s BBC soap opera Triangle (1982-1983), the 1985 film Shadey (1985), and the TV series Troubles (1988), but has not performed since 1988.

== Filmography ==
=== Film ===
Year	Title	Role	Notes
1976	The Copter Kids	Bill Peters	
1976	Bugsy Malone	Newsreporter / Johnston The Butler / English Boy on Telephone	Uncredited
1978	Damien: Omen II	Damien Thorn	
1985	Shadey	Arthur	

=== Television ===
Year	Title	Role	Notes
1977	Play of the Month	Ronnie Winslow	Episode: "The Winslow Boy"
1977	Fathers and Families	Peter Frend	Television mini-series
1977	The Cedar Tree	James Hamilton	Recurring role; 2 episodes
1977	1990	Bevan	Episode: "Witness"
1978	The Four Feathers	Harry Feversham (aged 14)	Television film
1978–1979	The Mill on the Floss	Tom Tulliver	Guest role; 3 episodes
1979	BBC Television Shakespeare	Lucius	Episode: Julius Caesar
1980	Tales of the Unexpected	Young Bruce Foxley	Episode: "Galloping Foxley"
1981	Strangers	Wes	Episode: "Stand and Deliver"
1982	Saturday Night Thriller	Simon Lewis	Episode: "A Gift of Tongues"
1982–1983	Triangle	Ted Anderson	Main role; 48 episodes
1988	Troubles	Berry	Recurring role; 2 episodes
