= The Omen =

1976 film by Richard Donner

- Theatrical release poster by Tom Jung
- Directed by: Richard Donner
- Written by: David Seltzer
- Produced by: Harvey Bernhard
- Starring: Gregory Peck; Lee Remick; David Warner; Billie Whitelaw
- Cinematography: Gilbert Taylor
- Edited by: Stuart Baird
- Music by: Jerry Goldsmith
- Production companies: 20th Century-Fox; Mace Neufeld Productions
- Distributed by: Fox-Rank Distributors (United Kingdom); 20th Century-Fox (United States)
- Release dates: June 6, 1976 (United Kingdom); June 25, 1976 (United States)
- Running time: 111 minutes
- Countries: United Kingdom; United States
- Language: English
- Budget: $2.8 million
- Box office: $78.7 million

The Omen is a 1976 supernatural horror film directed by Richard Donner, written by David Seltzer, and produced by Harvey Bernhard. It stars Gregory Peck, Lee Remick, David Warner, Harvey Spencer Stephens (in his film debut), Billie Whitelaw, Patrick Troughton, Martin Benson, and Leo McKern. The film follows Damien Thorn, a young child replaced at birth by his father, unbeknownst to his wife, after their biological child dies shortly after birth. While a series of mysterious events and violent deaths occur around the family and Damien enters childhood, they come to understand he is in fact the prophesied Antichrist.

The Omen is an international co-production of the United Kingdom and the United States. It was released theatrically by 20th Century-Fox in June 1976. The film initially received mixed reviews from critics but was a financial success, grossing nearly $79 million and becoming one of the highest-grossing films of 1976. It earned two Academy Award nominations, including a win for Jerry Goldsmith's musical score, and retrospective reviews have been more favorable.

The film spawned the Omen franchise, with Damien – Omen II released in 1978, followed by The Final Conflict (1981) and Omen IV: The Awakening (1991), as well as a 2006 remake and 2024 prequel. It also spawned a television series that ran for one season on A&E in 2016.

== Plot ==
American diplomat Robert Thorn and his wife Katherine are living in Rome, where Katherine gives birth to a boy. Father Spiletto, the hospital chaplain, tells Robert his baby died after one breath and persuades him to secretly adopt another baby whose mother also died in childbirth that night. Robert does not tell Katherine that the child is not their own and they name him Damien.

Five years later, Robert is Ambassador to the United Kingdom in London when a series of mysterious events plague the Thorns: a menacing Rottweiler appears at their home, Damien's nanny publicly hangs herself during his fifth birthday party, a replacement nanny named Mrs. Baylock arrives unexpectedly, Damien violently resists entering a church, and animals at a safari park are terrified by his presence. Robert receives visits from catholic priest Father Brennan who warns him about Damien's origins, stating he is not human and insisting Robert take Holy Communion. He later tells Robert that Damien is the son of Satan, that Katherine is pregnant, and that Damien will kill his unborn sibling and parents. After Robert dismisses it all and leaves, a storm breaks out. Father Brennan attempts to find shelter in a nearby church and is killed when its lightning rod is struck by lightning and impales him. Katherine tells Robert she wants an abortion, which he opposes in an attempt to defy the prophecy. Damien knocks Katherine over a railing to the floor below, hospitalizing her and causing her to miscarry.

Photographer Keith Jennings notices shadows in photographs of the nanny and Father Brennan that presage their deaths then sees a similar mark across himself in a later photo. Keith shows Robert the photos along with news clippings and Biblical passages from Father Brennan suggesting the coming of the Antichrist. He accompanies Robert to Rome to investigate Damien's birth. They find out that a fire destroyed the hospital, including Katherine's maternity records, and killed the staff on duty. They find Father Spiletto in a monastery, severely burned, mute, blind in one eye, and partially paralyzed. He directs them to the cemetery where Damien's biological mother is buried. In the grave of Damien's mother, Robert and Keith find a jackal carcass and, in the next plot, a child's skeleton with a shattered skull. Robert realizes that the child is his own son, murdered so that Damien could take his place. A pack of Rottweilers drives Robert and Keith away from the cemetery.

Robert calls Katherine in the hospital to tell her that she must leave London. Before she can do so, Mrs. Baylock throws Katherine to her death from the window of her room. Robert and Keith travel to meet with Antichrist exorcism expert Carl Bugenhagen in Jerusalem, who says that if Damien is the true Antichrist, he will bear a birthmark in the shape of three sixes. Carl gives Robert seven daggers with which to kill Damien on hallowed ground. Robert refuses to do so, but Keith remains convinced of its necessity. Shortly afterwards, Keith is decapitated by a sliding pane of sheet glass from a truck. Horrified, Robert reluctantly accepts his task.

Robert finds the birthmark on the sleeping Damien's scalp and is then attacked by Mrs. Baylock, whom he fatally stabs. Armed with the daggers, Robert drives Damien to a local cathedral. His erratic driving draws the attention of the police. Robert drags a screaming Damien onto the altar to kill him and begs God to forgive him, but the police arrive on the scene and shoot him dead as he brandishes the first dagger.

A double funeral ceremony is attended by the U.S. President and the First Lady. It is shown to be the funeral of Robert and Katherine. Damien, standing with the first couple, turns and breaks the fourth wall to smile at the film audience.

== Cast ==
- Gregory Peck as Robert Thorn
- Lee Remick as Katherine Thorn
- David Warner as Keith Jennings
- Billie Whitelaw as Mrs. Baylock
- Harvey Spencer Stephens as Damien Thorn
- Patrick Troughton as Father Brennan
- Martin Benson as Father Spiletto
- Leo McKern as Carl Bugenhagen (uncredited)
- Robert Rietti as Monk
- Tommy Duggan as Priest
- John Stride as The Psychiatrist
- Anthony Nicholls as Dr. Fred Becker
- Holly Palance as Nanny
- Roy Boyd as Reporter
- Freda Dowie as Nun
- Sheila Raynor as Mrs. Ingrid Horton
- Robert MacLeod as Horton
- Bruce Boa as Thorn Aide 1
- Don Fellows as Thorn Aide 2
- Patrick McAlinney as Photographer
- Betty McDowall as American secretary
- Nicholas Campbell as embassy guard Marine Corporal

== Production ==
=== Development ===
According to producer Harvey Bernhard, the idea of a motion picture about the Antichrist came after a discussion about the Bible with Bob Munger, a friend of Bernhard's. When Munger told him about the idea in 1973, the producer immediately contacted screenwriter David Seltzer and hired him to write a screenplay. It took a year for Seltzer to write the script.

The film was considered by Warner Bros. Pictures, but the project did not move forward until optioned by Alan Ladd Jr. of 20th Century-Fox. Seltzer and Donner differed over the film's message. Donner favored an ambiguous reading of the script under which it would be left for the audience to decide whether Damien was the Antichrist or whether the series of violent deaths in the film were all just a string of unfortunate accidents. Seltzer rejected the ambiguity favored by Donner and pressed for an interpretation of his script that left no doubt for the audience that Damien Thorn was the Antichrist and that all of the deaths in the film were caused by the malevolent power of Satan, the interpretation that Bernhard chose to go with.

=== Casting ===
Bernhard claims Gregory Peck had been the choice to portray Ambassador Thorn from the beginning. Peck got involved with the project through his agent, who was friends with producer Bernhard. After reading the script, Peck reportedly liked the idea that it was more of a psychological thriller rather than a horror film and agreed to star in it. He was at first displeased with the props and effects designed for the death scenes but was relieved to find how restrained and non-exploitative they were in the final film.

Despite Bernhard's claim, there were other actors considered for the role because studios were reluctant to cast Peck as a child killer. Warner Bros. Pictures thought the role would be ideal for Oliver Reed. William Holden had also been approached for the role, but turned it down, claiming he did not want to star in a film about the devil. Holden would later portray Thorn's brother, Richard, in the sequel, Damien – Omen II (1978). A firm offer was made to Charlton Heston on July 19, 1975. He turned down the part on July 27, not wanting to spend an entire winter alone in Europe and also concerned that the film might have an exploitative feel if not handled carefully. Roy Scheider, Dick Van Dyke, and Charles Bronson were also considered for the role of Robert Thorn. Van Dyke turned down the role because of the violence and gore; he would later call the decision "stupid".

According to separate interviews with Donner and Harvey Stephens, over 500 boys had auditioned for the role of Damien. The then four-year-old Stephens won the role after Donner encouraged the boys to attack him during a group audition, following which Stephens reportedly clawed at Donner's face and kicked him in the groin. Because Stephens had curly blonde hair, Donner had Stephens' hair straightened and dyed black, and gave him colored contacts to make him look scarier.

=== Filming ===
Principal photography of The Omen began on October 6, 1975, and lasted eleven weeks, wrapping on January 9, 1976. Scenes were shot on location in Bishops Park in Fulham, London and Guildford Cathedral in Surrey. The Thorns' country manor was filmed at Pyrford Court in Surrey. The church featured in the Bishop's Park neighbourhood is All Saints' Church, Fulham, on the western side of Putney Bridge Road. The church used in the final climactic scene is St Peter's in Staines-upon-Thames. Additional photography took place at Shepperton Studios outside London, as well as on location in Jerusalem and Rome.

For the scene where Katherine's car is attacked by baboons, production initially tried to have the baboons attack by placing food around the car (after having the zoo staff members deliberately not feed the baboons the night before filming), whilst also placing a baby baboon in the back seat of the car with a zoo official. After it failed to earn the desired effect, the official swapped out the baby baboon for the alpha baboon, which got the baboons to attack the car. According to Richard Donner, Lee Remick's terror during the scene was authentic.

== Analysis ==
American scholar Brad Duren argued that The Omen was part of a trend of films featuring cosmic horror that started with Rosemary's Baby in 1968, but the film was unusual at the time because it concerned the "end times" predicted in The Book of Revelation and focused on a form of premillennialism favored by American dispensationalists. Duren further maintained that the box office success of The Omen, which concerned the first stages of the Apocalypse as the Antichrist is born, reflected the zeitgeist of 1970s America.

In 1973, an advertising executive and evangelical Christian, Robert Munger, who had read Hal Lindsey's book The Late Great Planet Earth, speculated to film producer Harvey Bernard about the possibility that the Antichrist might be walking the earth in the form of a child, unknown to the vast majority of humanity. This conversation inspired Bernard with the idea for the film that became The Omen. Bernard commissioned scriptwriter David Seltzer to write a script for the film. Seltzer in turn borrowed many ideas from dispensationalism, especially The Late Great Planet Earth, while also inventing his own. For an example, a supposed quote from the Book of Revelation featured in The Omen ("When the Jews return to Zion and a comet rips the sky and the Holy Roman Empire rises, then you and I must die; from the eternal sea he rises, creating armies on either shore, turning man against his brother, 'til man exists no more") is not in fact in that book. Likewise, the sinister figure who will rule the world for seven years predicted in Revelation, commonly known as the Antichrist, is not described in the Bible as the son of Satan, whereas Satan is the father of the Antichrist in The Omen.

Jim Knipfel in The Omen: The Pedigree of a Horror Classic on Den of Geek, opines of The Omen:

"[T]here is no single source quite as central and clearly influential as "The Devil's Platform", a 1974 episode from the first season of Kolchak: The Night Stalker, with stars Tom Skerritt (credited as "Tom Skerrit") as Robert Palmer, a young politician whose meteoric rise seemed to come out of nowhere. He seems a shoo-in to become the new state senator from Illinois, but is already gunning for the White House. ...Palmer is rising quickly in the world of politics, which of course was the subtext of the entire Omen franchise. Anyone who threatens his rise or stands in his way — major political donors, speechwriters for the opposing candidate, even the opposing candidate himself — ends up dying mysteriously as the result of a tragic and freakish accident, which was the hook that brought most people to the theaters to see the Omen films in the first place. ...Palmer, again like Damien, also has a very protective Rottweiler familiar, who is impervious to harm. ... Like David Warner's photographer in the first film, inexplicable photographic anomalies help point Kolchak in the right direction. ... And finally, in the end the ambitious Satanic candidate is dispatched with a holy instrument (blessed daggers in The Final Conflict, holy water in The Night Stalker). So there. In a way, watching "The Devil's Platform" is a bit like watching all three Omen films from an outsider journalist's perspective, except Kolchak is able to wrap the whole thing up neatly in an hour."

The success of the film in 1976 may have been due to a sense of malaise in the West at the time. As film critic John Kenneth Muir wrote: "What if the Bible is correct? What if all the signs of the Apocalypse are happening around about now? Would we believe them? Heck, would we even notice?" Duren wrote that, although it was unlikely that most people who viewed the film in 1976 accepted the dispensationalist viewpoint, the mere feeling that the world or the West was in terminal decline gave the film a resonance that its subsequent sequels lacked. Beyond the success of the film, Duren wrote that the impact of the film on popular culture can be seen in the way that many people accept the dispensationalist reading of the Book of Revelation as the correct interpretation whereas in fact, the dispensationalist interpretation was and still is rejected by many churches. Duren wrote that dispensationalism had once been a "fringe" theory within Protestant theology, but due to the popularity of The Omen it is now widely accepted as doctrine.

Duren notes that in the film it has to be explained to Robert Thorn that the number 666 is the "mark of the beast" and speculates that audiences in 1976 were not familiar with this aspect of the Book of Revelation, but because of the film's popularity, the number 666 has entered popular culture and most people, even those of a secular bent, are aware of the sinister significance attached to the number.

== Music ==
Jerry Goldsmith – "Ave Satani"

An original score for the film, including the movie's theme song "Ave Satani", was composed by Jerry Goldsmith, for which he received the only Oscar of his career. The score features a strong choral segment, with a foreboding Latin chant. According to Goldsmith's wife, Carol, the composer initially struggled with ideas for the score until one evening when he suddenly, happily announced to her, "I hear voices", referring to an orchestral chorus or choir. The Latin of this song contains some errors: "We drink the blood" must be Sanguinem bibimus (accusative form of sanguis), also "Hail Satan!" is Ave Satana (vocative form), and as for Ave Versus Christus is nonsense in Latin: the correct form is Ave Antichriste (vocative form of Antichristus, the Latin name for the Biblical Antichrist).

== Release ==
=== Box office ===
The Omen was released following a successful $2.8 million marketing campaign inspired by the one from Jaws one year prior, with two weeks of sneak previews, a novelization by screenwriter David Seltzer, and the logo with "666" inside the film's title as the centerpiece of the advertisement. An early screening of the film took place in numerous U.S. cities on June 6, 1976.

The film opened in the United States and Canada on June 25, 1976, in 516 theaters. A significant commercial success, it grossed $4,273,886 in its opening weekend (a then-record for Fox) and $60,922,980 in total (equivalent to $334,414,696 in 2024), generating theatrical rentals of $28.5 million in the United States and Canada. Worldwide it earned rentals of $46.3 million from a budget of $2.8 million. In the United States, the film was the sixth-highest-grossing movie of 1976.

During its release in South Africa under the apartheid regime, the Publication Approval Board cut the final scenes showing the killing of Robert Thorn and Damien's survival.

=== Critical response ===
==== Contemporary ====
Richard Eder of The New York Times called it "a dreadfully silly film" but "reasonably well-paced. We don't have time to brood about the sillinesses of any particular scene before we are on to the next. There is not a great deal of excitement, but we manage to sustain some curiosity as to how things will work out." Variety praised Richard Donner's direction as "taut" and the performances as "strong", and noted that the script, "sometimes too expository, too predictable, too contrived, is nonetheless a good connective fibre." Roger Ebert gave the film 2.5 stars out of four, saying the "material is approached with the greatest solemnity, not only in the performances but also in the photography, the music and the very looks on people's faces." He added that "as long as movies like The Omen are merely scaring us, they're fun in a portentous sort of way." Gene Siskel of the Chicago Tribune gave it the same score, lauding the "firepower sound track" and several "memorable" scenes, but finding the story "goofy". Kevin Thomas of the Los Angeles Times called it "an absolutely riveting, thoroughly scary experience, a triumph of sleek film craftsmanship that will inevitably but not necessarily unfavorably be compared to The Exorcist." Tom Shales of The Washington Post declared, "It's probably the classiest Exorcist copy yet, but as a summer thriller, it can hardly challenge the human appeal and exhilarating impact of last year's Jaws ... Seltzer, busy justifying his baloney premise with Biblical quotations, forgets about narrative logic or empathetic characters."

Gene Shalit called the film "a piece of junk", and Judith Crist said it "offers more laughs than the average comedy." Jack Kroll of Newsweek called it "a dumb and largely dull movie." Duncan Leigh Cooper of Cinéaste wrote, "Despite its improbable story line and abundance of gratuitous violence, The Omen does succeed in its attempt to frighten, terrorize, and just plain scare the pants off most of the audience. Impressive performances ... plus a chilling mock-religious score by Jerry Goldsmith and the skillful direction of Richard Donner, all contribute to the suspension of disbelief required to draw the audience into the film's web of terror." Richard Combs of The Monthly Film Bulletin described the movie as "[a] matter-of-fact exercise in Satanic blood and thunder, both less grandiloquently and less pretentiously put together than The Exorcist ... In fact, the narrative is so straightforward, and so mundanely concerned with developing ever more ingenious ways, at a rapidly increasing clip, of disposing of its starry cast, that the spiritual torment is skimped."

==== Retrospective ====
In 1978, two years after its release, The Omen was included in Harry Medved and Harry Dreyfuss's book The Fifty Worst Films of All Time. It was the most recent film featured.

Retrospective reviews of the film have been more favorable. On review aggregator website Rotten Tomatoes, it has an approval rating of 76% based on 110 reviews. The site's consensus reads: "The Omen eschews an excess of gore in favor of ramping up the suspense—and creates an enduring, dread-soaked horror classic along the way". On Metacritic, the film has a weighted average score of 62 out of 100 based on 11 critics, indicating "generally favorable reviews".

The Omen was ranked number 81 on the American Film Institute's 100 Years... 100 Thrills, and the score by Jerry Goldsmith was nominated for AFI's 100 Years of Film Scores. The film was ranked #16 on Bravo's 100 Scariest Movie Moments. Similarly, the Chicago Film Critics' Association named it the 31st-scariest film ever made. It has also been ranked as one of the best horror films of 1976 by Filmsite.org.

The film was criticized by the Catholic Church, which accused it of misrepresenting Christian eschatology. On the other hand, some Protestant groups praised the film, and the California Graduate School of Theology in Glendale presented the filmmakers with a special award during its 1977 commencement ceremonies.

==== Accolades ====
| Institution | Category | Recipient | Result | Ref. |
|---|---|---|---|---|
| Academy Awards | Best Original Score | Jerry Goldsmith | Won | |
| Academy Awards | Best Original Song | Jerry Goldsmith | Nominated | |
| BAFTA Awards | Best Supporting Actress | Billie Whitelaw | Nominated | |
| British Society of Cinematographers | Best Cinematography | Gilbert Taylor | Won | |
| Edgar Allan Poe Award | Best Screenplay | David Seltzer | Nominated | |
| Evening Standard British Film Awards | Best Actress | Billie Whitelaw | Won | |
| Golden Globe Awards | Best Acting Debut – Male | Harvey Stephens | Nominated | |
| Grammy Awards | Best Album of Original Score | Jerry Goldsmith | Nominated | |
| Saturn Awards | Best Horror Film | The Omen | Nominated | |
| Saturn Awards | Best Actor in a Horror Film | Gregory Peck | Won | |
| Writers Guild of America | Best Original Screenplay | David Seltzer | Nominated | |

=== Home media ===
The Omen was released on VHS by 20th Century Fox Home Video in 1980. A VHS reissue was released by Fox under their "Selection Series" in 2000. The same year, a special-edition DVD was released by 20th Century Fox Home Video as a standalone release as well as in a four-film set that included its three sequels. A newly restored two-disc collector's edition DVD of the film was issued in 2006, coinciding with the release of the remake.

The film had its debut on Blu-ray in October 2008 as part of a four-film collection, featuring the first two sequels—Damien – Omen II and The Final Conflict—as well as the 2006 remake. The fourth sequel, Omen: The Awakening, was not included in this set. On October 15, 2019, Scream Factory released a deluxe-edition box set—featuring the original film, along with all three sequels and the remake—and featuring newly commissioned bonus materials. The Scream Factory release features a new 4K restoration of the original film elements.

== Franchise ==
=== Films ===
A novelization of The Omen was written by screenwriter David Seltzer and released two weeks before the film. For the book, Seltzer augmented some plot points and character backgrounds and changed minor details, including some character names: Holly became Chessa Whyte, Keith Jennings became Haber Jennings and Father Brennan became Father Edgardo Emilio Tassone.

The Omen was followed by three sequels: Damien – Omen II (1978), The Final Conflict (1981), and Omen IV: The Awakening (1991). A remake of the same title was released in 2006, starring Liev Schreiber and Julia Stiles in the roles of Robert and Katherine, and Mia Farrow portraying Mrs. Baylock. A prequel to the first film titled The First Omen was released on April 5, 2024.

=== Television ===
==== The Omen (1995) ====
In 1995, a television pilot titled The Omen aired on NBC, on September 8 of that year. Directed by Jack Sholder, the hour-long episode was intended as an attempt to develop The Omen franchise into a TV series. Although Donner was attached to the project as an executive producer, the pilot failed and the series never moved forward. Unrelated to the previous films, The Omen follows a group of people who are tracking down an entity to which they are all independently linked.

==== Damien (2016) ====
A television series called Damien was in development at the network Lifetime before it was moved to A&E with Bradley James starring in the title role. The series aired from March 7 to May 9, 2016. The series, acting as a direct sequel to the original film, follows 30-year-old Damien, who has forgotten his demonic past, facing his true identity. Ann Rutledge (Barbara Hershey), who has protected Damien all his life, helps him embrace his Antichrist side.

== See also ==
- List of fictional Antichrists

== Sources ==
- Fishgall, Gary (2002). Gregory Peck: A Biography. New York: Simon and Schuster. ISBN 978-0-684-85290-4.
- Duren, Brad (2017). "Reckoning the Number of the Beast: Premillernial Dispensationalism, The Omen, and 1970s America". In J. Miller, Cynthia; A. Bowdoin Van Riper (eds.). Divine Horror: Essays on the Cinematic Battle Between the Sacred and the Diabolical. Jefferson, North Carolina: McFarland. ISBN 978-1-4766-2984-1.
- Lacey, Robert (1981). The Kingdom. San Diego, California: Harcourt Brace Jovanovich. ISBN 0-15-147260-2.
- Medved, Harry; Dreyfuss, Randy (1978). The Fifty Worst Films of All Time (and how they got that way). Popular Library. ISBN 0-445-04139-0.
- Wyatt, Justin (1998). Lewis, Jon (ed.). The New American Cinema. Durham, North Carolina: Duke University Press. ISBN 0-8223-2115-7.
