= The Omen (2006 film) =

- Theatrical release poster
- Directed by: John Moore
- Written by: David Seltzer
- Produced by: Glen Williamsonn; John Moore
- Starring: Julia Stiles; Liev Schreiber; Mia Farrow; David Thewlis; Pete Postlethwaite; Michael Gambon; Seamus Davey-Fitzpatrick
- Cinematography: Jonathan Sela
- Edited by: Dan Zimmerman
- Music by: Marco Beltrami
- Production company: 20th Century Fox
- Distributed by: 20th Century Fox
- Release date: June 6, 2006
- Running time: 110 minutes
- Country: United States
- Language: English
- Budget: $25 million
- Box office: $120 million

The Omen (also known as The Omen: 666) is a 2006 American supernatural horror film directed by John Moore and written by David Seltzer. The fifth installment in The Omen series, it is a remake of the 1976 film of the same title, which was also written by Seltzer. This version stars Julia Stiles, Liev Schreiber, Mia Farrow, David Thewlis, Pete Postlethwaite, Michael Gambon, and Seamus Davey-Fitzpatrick in his feature film debut.

It was released worldwide on June 6, 2006, by 20th Century Fox. It received mixed reviews from critics and grossed $120 million against a $25 million budget.

== Plot ==
Robert Thorn, an American diplomat stationed in Italy, is told that his son was stillborn. Unknown to his unconscious wife, Katherine, Robert adopts an orphaned newborn at the suggestion of the hospital's chaplain Catholic priest, Father Spiletto. Naming him Damien, Robert and Katherine raise the boy. Robert's career ascends over the next 5 years. He is named Deputy Ambassador to the Court of St. James's in the United Kingdom. Following the death of the previous ambassador in a suspicious vehicle fire caused by a vagrant, Robert assumes his position and settles in a large estate just outside London. However, disturbing events begin to occur.

At Damien's birthday party, his nanny is seemingly hypnotised by a mysterious black dog loitering in the estate gerdens. She makes sure she has the attention of the children and families in attendance, then dramatically hangs herself.

Robert is approached by Father Brennan, who claims to have been involved with events surrounding Damien's birth. Meanwhile, photographer Keith Jennings finds that several of his photographs contain mysterious omens, including premonitions of people's deaths. A new nanny, Mrs. Baylock, is hired. Tension rises when Mrs. Baylock starts to make decisions without the consent of the Thorns, including adopting a Rottweiler for Damien's protection.

Following an incident near a chapel in which Damien attacks Katherine, she begins experiencing vivid dreams about her son, one of these involving a red-hooded jackal skeleton. When the Thorns visit a zoo, the animals react violently at the sight of Damien. Katherine begins to wonder if there is something wrong with Damien. Father Brennan confronts Robert, telling him that Damien's mother was a jackal and that the boy is the Antichrist. He explains that Damien must die, and a man named Bugenhagen, located in Megiddo, can help. After being rebuked, Father Brennan is killed during a lightning storm.

Katherine discovers she is pregnant and is determined to get an abortion, in fear of having a child similar to Damien. Soon afterward, Damien causes an accident in which Katherine is severely injured, resulting in her miscarriage. While in the hospital, Katherine confides in Robert that she has suspicions that Damien is evil. Jennings meets with Robert and shows him the photographs, including a new omen of his death. Robert decides to rendezvous with Jennings and search for Damien's biological mother. The pair discovers the hospital where Damien was delivered has since been demolished after a fire. They travel to Subiaco and meet a deformed Father Spiletto, who directs them to a graveyard. There, they find the grave of Damien's mother, who is revealed to have indeed been a jackal. In the neighboring tomb, Robert discovers the corpse of his murdered biological son. He and Jennings are attacked by a pack of dogs and barely escape.

Mrs. Baylock visits Katherine in the hospital and causes her to have an air embolism, which kills her. Learning of Katherine's death, Robert goes to Megiddo, meets Bugenhagen, and receives instructions on how to kill Damien on consecrated ground with 7 sacrificial daggers. Bugenhagen tells Robert to examine Damien for a birthmark in the shape of three sixes ("666"). However, Robert refuses to kill his son and throws the daggers on the ground. While reaching down to pick up the daggers, Jennings is suddenly decapitated by a falling sign.

Robert takes the daggers, arrives home, and is attacked by Mrs. Baylock's Rottweiler, which he traps in the basement. In Damien's room, he finds the 666 birthmark. Mrs. Baylock attacks Robert. He fends her off, takes Damien, and drives to a nearby cathedral, running over Mrs. Baylock in the process. Pursued by the police, Robert flees to a church to kill Damien but is shot dead before he can by a Diplomatic Protection officer.

As the Pope simultaneously dies, Robert's funeral is attended by the President of the United States, who holds Damien's hand. Damien then looks at the audience and makes a triumphant, sinister smirk.

== Cast ==
- Liev Schreiber as Robert Thorn
- Julia Stiles as Katherine Thorn
- Mia Farrow as Mrs. Willa Baylock
- Seamus Davey-Fitzpatrick as Damien Thorn
- David Thewlis as Keith Jennings
- Pete Postlethwaite as Father Brennan
- Michael Gambon as Bugenhagen
- Giovanni Lombardo Radice as Father Spiletto
- Pedja Bjelac as Vatican Observatory Priest

Harvey Spencer Stephens, who portrayed Damien in the original film, made a cameo appearance as a reporter.

== Production ==
The film was greenlit in July 2005 with Dan McDermott attached to write and John Moore directing. McDermott was later denied a writing credit by the Writers Guild of America, as the screenplay was determined to be too similar to David Seltzer's script for the 1976 film. Instead, Seltzer received sole credit, despite being uninvolved with the remake's production. In an episode of the Scriptnotes podcast, screenwriter Craig Mazin cited this as an unusual outcome of the WGA's arbitration process.

According to the feature commentary on the DVD, hosted by Moore, editor Dan Zimmerman, and producer Glenn Williamson, the search for Damien spanned Los Angeles, London and New York. In 2005 newcomer Seamus Davey-Fitzpatrick was cast in the part, with his screen test doubling as the movie's teaser trailer.

Principal photography began on October 3, 2005, at Barrandov Studios in Prague, Czech Republic where the film was mostly shot. The "Jerusalem" scenes were filmed in Matera, Italy and some of the London scenes were shot in Herbert Park, Dublin.

In May 2021, a scandal arose in Croatia after Split-Dalmatia County prefect Blaženko Boban confessed to the Minister of Tourism Nikolina Brnjac in front of the media that, in order to chase the film crew away, he deliberately staged a fire in Salona, which was to become the movie set for the scenes filmed in the country. He apparently did it because, in one scene, "Satan was supposed to come out of the tomb of Saint Domnius". Director John Moore told the media afterwards that the cost of relocation was US$500,000 (equivalent to $798,531 in 2025). After police announced that they were investigating the case, Boban denied the whole thing, claiming that he had been joking.

=== Music ===
The score was composed by Marco Beltrami, using cues from Jerry Goldsmith's Oscar-winning score for the original film.

== Release ==
The film was released on June 6, 2006 (6/6/06), referencing the Number of the Beast, and mirroring the 1976 film's similar release date of June 6, 1976.

=== Box office ===
The film recorded the highest opening Tuesday box office gross in domestic box office history in the United States for the time, by earning more than US$12 million. As of June 2026, it holds the 7th highest opening Tuesday at the domestic box-office.

Fox initially stated that the film earned US$12,633,666 on its first day, but later Bruce Snyder, Fox's president of distribution admitted that they were "having a little fun" by manipulating the figure to contain the number of the beast in the last three digits.

The film ended up grossing US$120 million worldwide, making it a strong success on a budget of US$25 million. It finished as the 59th highest-grossing film of 2006, the 12th highest-grossing R-rated movie of 2006 and the 2nd highest domestic gross of The Omen series when adjusted for inflation.

=== Critical response ===
On Rotten Tomatoes, the film has an approval rating of 26% based on 165 reviews, with an average rating of 4.6/10. The site's critical consensus reads, "Even with the force of a 'classic' behind it, remake fever can't hold up the hollowness of this style-drenched Omen." On Metacritic, the film has a weighted average score of 43 out of 100 based on 34 critics, indicating "mixed or average reviews". Audiences polled by CinemaScore gave the film an average grade of "C+" on an A+ to F scale.

James Berardinelli commented: "On every level, The Omen isn't just bad filmmaking, it's bad storytelling". He especially criticized its similarity to the original movie, which he also greatly disliked. Rolling Stone also made the latter point: "Not since Gus Van Sant inexplicably directed a shot-by-shot remake of Hitchcock's Psycho has a thriller been copied with so little point or impact".

Roger Ebert gave the film a "thumbs up" and three stars out of four, in contrast to his negative review of the original, praising John Moore for letting the strong story unfold itself rather than foregrounding visual effects. The Washington Post's Stephen Hunter praised the film: "It's handsome in the way it's fast-moving: sleek, well-engineered, full of gooses and honks. Some of the casting seems a little off. Still, it works."

In 2017, Slashfilm listed it as one of the 15 worst horror remakes of all time, citing the direction as lifeless and the film pointless due to its fidelity to the original.

=== Awards ===
Seamus Davey-Fitzpatrick won a Chainsaw award from Fangoria magazine for "Creepiest Kid".

David Thewlis was nominated for a Razzie Award for Worst Supporting Actor in 2007, but lost to M. Night Shyamalan for Lady in the Water.

== Home media ==
The film was released in the US as a Region 1 DVD on October 17, 2006. It was released in the UK as a Region 2 DVD on October 23, 2006. It was released in Australia as a Region 4 DVD on March 7, 2007.

The film was released on Blu-ray on November 14, 2006.
