= Harvey Spencer Stephens =

English actor (born 1970)

Harvey Stephens
- Born: Harvey Spencer Stephens; 12 November 1970 (age 55); Putney, London, England
- Occupation: Actor
- Years active: 1975–2006
- Notable work: The Omen (1976)
- Children: 2

Harvey Spencer Stephens (born 12 November 1970) is an English former actor. He played the role of devil child Damien Thorn in the 1976 film The Omen, which earned him a Golden Globe nomination for Best Acting Debut in a Motion Picture – Male.

== Biography ==
Stephens was born in Putney, London and was educated at Malory Comprehensive School (currently Haberdashers' Knights Academy), Bromley. He was four years old when picked for the part, which required him to have his blond hair dyed dark brown. In an interview with AMC, director Richard Donner said Stephens got the part after attacking the filmmaker (at Donner's urging), punching Donner in the testicles for good measure.

It was the only major film role in Stephens' career; he would later play a small role in the 1980 TV film Gauguin the Savage. He also appears in the DVD special features section of the 2006 version of The Omen, and has a bit part as a tabloid journalist in the film. Interview footage of Stephens from 1996 was used in the 2005 documentary The Curse of the Omen, a programme detailing the supposed eerie coincidences surrounding the making of the film.

Stephens appeared on The Howard Stern Show on Sirius Radio on 23 April 2008 to promote a film he was working on. He said he also has started appearing at autograph signings and horror conventions "with my tricycle”.

=== Legal issues ===
On 13 January 2017, Stephens was given a suspended prison sentence for a road rage attack on two cyclists at Toys Hill, Westerham, Kent, on 21 August 2016. Stephens repeatedly used his horn when riders Mark Richardson and Alex Manley, who were out cycling separately, were side-by-side on the road. Richardson responded by flicking his middle finger at Stephens. Stephens pulled over, got out of his car, and punched Richardson, knocking him unconscious, which prompted Manley to intervene. Stephens ended up punching Manley twice in the face, inflicting dental injuries.

Later in 2017, at Maidstone Crown Court, Stephens was sentenced to 12 months in jail, suspended for two years, for causing bodily harm, and to two months, also suspended for two years, for criminal damage. Stephens, a resident of Edenbridge, Kent, was ordered to undergo rehabilitation, perform 150 hours of unpaid work and pay compensation of £1,000 to each victim.

== Filmography ==
- The Omen (1976) – Damien Thorn
- Gauguin the Savage (1980, TV Movie) – Young Emil
- The Omen (2006) – Tabloid Reporter #3
