= David Seltzer =

American screenwriter (born 1940)

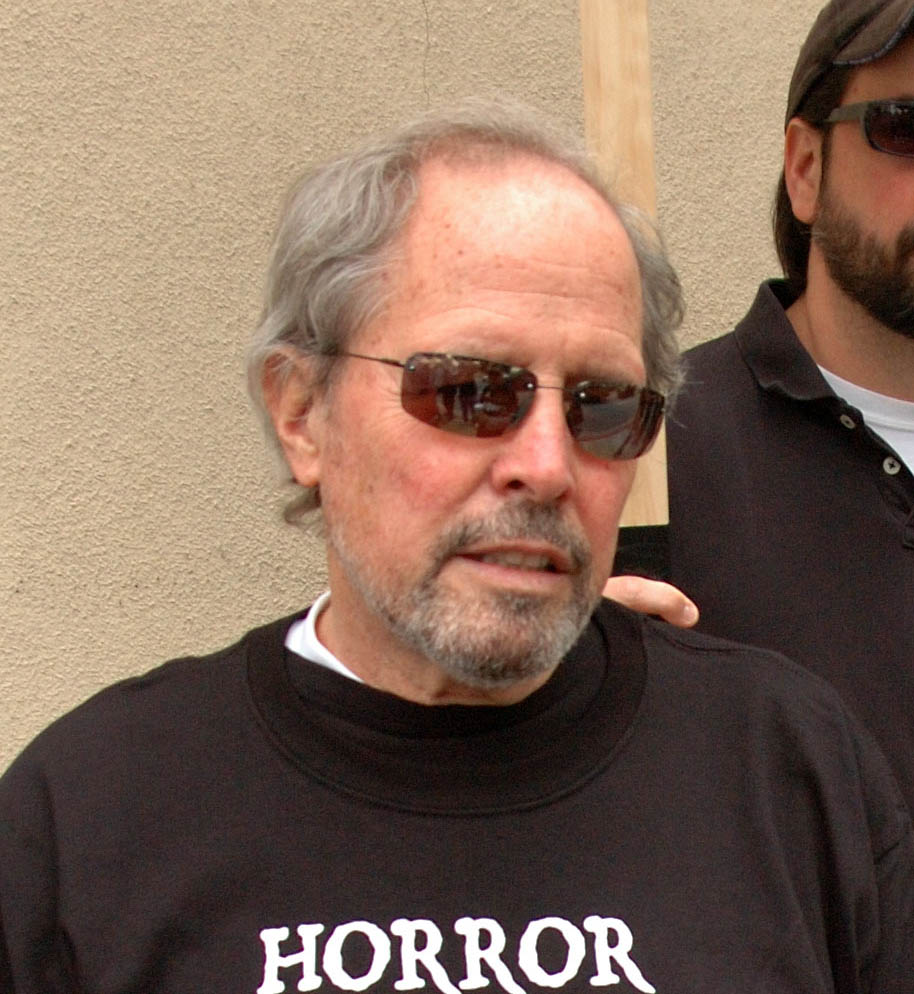
- Seltzer during the 2007–08 Writers Guild of America strike
- Born: February 12, 1940 (age 86); Highland Park, Illinois, U.S.
- Occupations: Screenwriter; producer; director
- Years active: 1966–2011
- Spouse: Eugenia Zukerman (m. 1987, divorced) Carrie Hauman (m. 2010)

David Seltzer (born February 12, 1940) is an American screenwriter, producer and director. He wrote the screenplays for the supernatural horror film The Omen (1976) and the action comedy film Bird on a Wire (1990). As writer-director, Seltzer's credits include the coming-of-age romantic sports film Lucas (1986), the comedy-drama film Punchline (1988), and the World War II drama film Shining Through (1992).

== Early life ==
David Seltzer was born to a Jewish family in Highland Park, Illinois in 1940.

== Career ==
Seltzer was uncredited for his contributions to the screenplay of the musical film Willy Wonka & the Chocolate Factory (1971). The author of the original book, Roald Dahl, is credited as the sole screenwriter, but it has been revealed that Seltzer rewrote 30 percent of Dahl's script, adding such elements as the "Slugworth subplot", music other than the original Oompa Loompa compositions (including "Pure Imagination" and "The Candy Man"), and the ending dialogue for the film.

Seltzer's writing credits include the screenplays for The Omen (1976), Prophecy (1979), Six Weeks (1982), My Giant (1998), Dragonfly (2002), and Bird on a Wire (1990). He wrote and directed Lucas (1986) starring Corey Haim, Charlie Sheen and Winona Ryder, Punchline (1988) starring Sally Field and Tom Hanks, Shining Through (1992) starring Melanie Griffith and Michael Douglas, and Nobody's Baby (2001) starring Gary Oldman and Skeet Ulrich.

In 2002, Seltzer was reported to be writing a UK remake of Alfred Hitchcock's Strangers on a Train (1951), from the novel by Patricia Highsmith. In 2008, he was reported to be writing an "Untitled Earthquake Project" for Hollywood director and producer J. J. Abrams, the plot of which was closely guarded, though it was confirmed that the film was not a remake of the disaster film Earthquake (1974).

== Filmography ==
Film

| Year | Title | Director | Writer | Producer |
|---|---|---|---|---|
| 1971 | Willy Wonka & the Chocolate Factory | No | Uncredited | No |
| 1971 | The Hellstrom Chronicle | No | Yes | No |
| 1972 | One Is a Lonely Number | No | Yes | No |
| 1972 | King, Queen, Knave | No | Yes | No |
| 1975 | The Other Side of the Mountain | No | Yes | No |
| 1976 | The Omen | No | Yes | No |
| 1979 | Prophecy | No | Yes | No |
| 1982 | Six Weeks | No | Yes | No |
| 1983 | Table for Five | No | Yes | No |
| 1986 | Lucas | Yes | Yes | No |
| 1988 | Punchline | Yes | Yes | No |
| 1990 | Bird on a Wire | No | Yes | No |
| 1992 | Shining Through | Yes | Yes | Yes |
| 1997 | The Eighteenth Angel | No | Yes | No |
| 1998 | My Giant | No | Yes | No |
| 2001 | Nobody's Baby | Yes | Yes | No |
| 2002 | Dragonfly | No | Yes | No |
| 2006 | The Omen | No | Credit only | No |

TV movies

| Year | Title | Writer | Producer |
|---|---|---|---|
| 1974 | Larry | Yes | No |
| 1977 | Green Eyes | Yes | Yes |
| 1985 | Private Sessions | Yes | No |
| 2011 | Cinema Verite | Yes | No |
