= The Adventures of Dudley the Dragon =

- Genre: Children's television series Comedy; Musical; Fantasy; Slice of life
- Created by: Ira Levy; Peter Williamson; Alex Galatis
- Based on: The Conserving Kingdom by the Ontario Ministry of Energy
- Developed by: YTV Studios
- Directed by: Stan Swan; Richard Mortimer; Louise Shekter; Allan Novak; E. Jane Thompson; Sue Brophey
- Presented by: Mark Gordon
- Starring: Daniel DeSanto; Kirk Dunn; Alex Galatis; Daniel Goodfellow; Natasha Greenblatt; Graham Greene; Anthony Scavone; Asia Vieira; Robin Weekes
- Voices of: Alex Galatis; James Rankin; Wende Welch; Sue Morrison; Patrick McKenna
- Theme music composer: Glenn Schellenberg
- Opening theme: "The Adventures of Dudley the Dragon", sung by Jackie Richardson
- Ending theme: "The Adventures of Dudley the Dragon", sung by Jackie Richardson
- Composers: Glenn Schellenberg; Andrew Zealley; Cam Machinnes; Alex Galatis (song lyrics); Evelyne Datl; Randy Vancourt
- Country of origin: Canada
- Original languages: English; French
- No. of seasons: 5
- No. of episodes: 65

Production
- Executive producers: Ira Levy; Peter Williamson
- Producers: Ira Levy; Peter Williamson; Breakthrough Films & Television Inc.
- Production locations: Toronto, Ontario, Canada
- Editors: Darren Jennekens; Jay Houpt
- Camera setup: Steven W. Benson; John Dynes; John Fox; Steve Cruickshank; Ted Hart; Eric Schurman; Kim Stephenson; Tom Swartz; Alfie Kemp; Blair Locke
- Running time: 30 min.
- Production company: Breakthrough Films & Television Inc.

Original release
- Network: TVOntario (1993–1995); YTV (1996–1997)
- Release: October 8, 1993 – September 13, 1997

The Adventures of Dudley the Dragon is a Canadian children's television series which aired on YTV in Canada and on public television stations (through Tampa, Florida PBS member station WEDU) in the United States. It aired from 1993 to 1997 and later reran until 1999. Made in live-action, it incorporated actors, full body costume characters (notably the titular dragon) and puppets.

Graham Greene won a Gemini Award in 1994 for his role. He was nominated in 1998 for the episode The Tiny Little Raincloud. Jackie Burroughs was also nominated in 1994 for the same award, this time for performing in the episode High Flying Dragon.

== Premise ==
The series follows Dudley, a dragon who recently woke up from centuries of hibernation and his new 10-year-old friends Matt and Sally, both of whom guide Dudley around the modern world and the trio would learn about environmentalism, friendship and pro-social values. Besides Matt and Sally, Dudley was later joined by other kids, Terry, Julia, Mickey and Laura. Other recurring characters included a laid back frog named Sammy, the Robins, a grouchy apple tree named Mr. Crabby Tree and a lovable caveman.

== Cast ==
=== Puppets ===
- Dudley the Dragon – Alex Galatis (Seasons 1–2, costumed performer and voice; Seasons 3–5, voice only) and Kirk Dunn (Seasons 3–5, costumed performer). A lovable, innocent, happy-go-lucky green dragon. In the series premiere, Dudley wakes up from centuries of hibernation. He quickly befriends Sally and Matt, among others, and just as quickly adjusts to his new surroundings. However, Dudley still has childlike qualities, notably having to learn valuable lessons from his friends. Nevertheless, Dudley proves to be a great friend to everyone. Dudley lives in a colourful cave, with his favourite teddy bear, Freddy Bear. His favourite food is dragonberries. Dudley has a love for adventure, but sometimes, when the adventures get just a little out of hand, Dudley would prefer to be back at home with his friends. In the series' final episode, The Last Dudley, Dudley realized that he was the only dragon still around. Dudley decides to take on one more adventure, looking for another dragon. Dudley doesn't have much luck, but in the end learns that his friends are his "true dragon friends". At the very end of the episode, a dragon that looks and sounds similar to Dudley (but wears a bowtie and glasses) shows up and asks Dudley if he's seen any dragons around. He is the main protagonist in the series.
  - Dudley's first introduction actually predates the creation of the series "Dudley the Dragon" by several years. In 1983, the Ontario Ministry of Energy wanted to teach children the importance of energy conservation. Karen Waterman wrote a play (The Conserving Kingdom), that did just that. The play featured a bumbling dragon named Dudley. The Conserving Kingdom was performed in grade schools from 1984 to 1987, and also led to a TV special in 1986. Dudley was a full-bodied puppet performed by Alex Galatis. In 1992, when Dudley got his own TV show, Galatis continued to perform Dudley. Galatis performed Dudley by using his right arm to operate Dudley's head and mouth, and his left arm to operate Dudley's left arm. During the first seasons of Dudley the Dragon, Dudley's right arm rested on his chest, with no form of movement. In between the first and second season, the Dudley costume was modified, with the right arm moving thanks to the help of a fishing line attached to Dudley's arm. The same process is used to perform various full-bodied Muppets, most notably Big Bird (from another PBS show). The new puppet also had an eyelid mechanism, but it wasn't until the third season that Dudley's eyelids could move at will. Also, beginning with the third season, actor Kirk Dunn took Galatis' duties as Dudley's costume performer. Nevertheless, Galatis continued to provide Dudley's voice for the remainder of the series. Dudley is the only character in the series to appear in every episode. In the short-lived French version of the series, Dudley was renamed "Arthur".

The remaining puppets were all hand puppets, performed by James Rankin, Sue Morrison, and (in early episodes) Wende Welch.

- Sammy the Frog – James Rankin (Seasons 1–5). Sammy is a laid-back frog who has a love for playing the saxophone. Sammy is typically on the sidelines, commenting on the adventures of Dudley's and the others. However, Sammy also frequently acts as a mentor to Dudley and the kids. Sammy is typically the first one to feel that something bad is going to happen, and often warns Dudley (whom he often refers to as "Big Green") about getting into trouble. In "Have Yourself a Crabby Little Christmas", it is revealed that Sammy is Jewish (his faith). Sammy has a Spanish-language cousin named Yammi, who appeared occasionally, though never in any scenes with his cousin (most likely due to the fact that James Rankin performed both characters). Sammy's first appearance was in the series premiere, and his last appearance was in the second-to-last episode Lullaby Dragon. In the short-lived French version of the series, he was named "Ti-Louis".
- Mr. Robin – James Rankin (Seasons 1–5). A chipper, though often forgettable robin. Mr. Robin is happily married to his wife, Mrs. Robin, and the two are almost always seen together. Like Sammy, Mr. Robin will also sometimes be the one to warn Dudley (whom he refers to as "Mr. Dudley") about getting into mischief. Mr. Robin's first name is Charles. His first appearance was in the series premiere, and his last appearance was in the series' final episode. In the French version of the series he was named "M. Rouge-Gorge".
- Mrs. Robin – Wende Welch (Season 1), Sue Morrison (Seasons 1–5). Like her husband, Mrs. Robin is very chipper, even when things go wrong. She's happily married to her husband, and also sometimes tries to talk Dudley out of getting into trouble. Mrs. Robin's first name is Tiffany. Her first appearance was in the series premiere, and her last appearance was in the series' final episode. Mrs. Robin was played by Wende Welch for the first few episodes (the last being "Dudley Meets Mr. Can"), but was quickly replaced by Sue Morrison. In the French version of the series, Mrs. Robin was named "Mme. Rouge-Gorge".
- Grandpa Robin – James Rankin (Seasons 2–5). A wise elderly robin who has "been around the world seven times plus two". He is the grandfather of either Mr. or Mrs. Robin. Grandpa Robin has a good knowledge of the magic that goes on in the forest, including the origins of "Giggle Soup" and "Bubble Pie". Like Mr. and Mrs. Robin, Grandpa Robin is kind and cheerful, but can also be forgettable. He too often acts as a guide to Dudley and the kids. Grandpa Robin also apparently asks as a school teacher for some of the kids, as evidenced in the episode "Alphabet Dragon". His first appearance was in the second-season episode "Dudley Through the Looking Glass". His last appearance was in the fifth-season episode "The Wishing Well". In the French version of the series, he was named "Gran-Pere Rouge Gorge".
- Junior Robin – James Rankin (Seasons 4–5). The Robin's infant son who appeared in the episode "Junior Robin's Big Day Out". At first, Junior was reluctant to fly and eat worms like other robins. He also initially had a fear of Dudley (although he liked Mickey). Eventually, with some help from Dudley and Mickey, Junior learned how to fly. Junior returned in the second-to-last episode "Lullaby Dragon". In the episode, Dudley was upset because he lost Freddy Bear. Dudley eventually found out that Junior Robin found Freddy Bear, and wanted to keep him. Dudley was reluctant to give up Freddy Bear, but eventually decided that Junior could take good care of Freddy.
- Yammi the Frog – James Rankin (Seasons 1, 3 and 5). Sammy's Spanish-language cousin who only appeared in three episodes ("Dudley in the Rainforest", "Dudley and the Lost City", and the series final episode, "The Last Dudley"). Like his cousin, Yammi likes music, and plays an instrument (the guitar). Yammi looks and sounds similar to Sammy, but has a slight Latin accent, a black moustache and eyebrows, and a purple serape. In the French version of the series, Yammi was named "Ti-Gus".
- The Dodo – James Rankin (Seasons 1, 3 and 4). A happy, fun-loving dodo bird, who loves saying, "dodo!". Like Yammi, The Dodo only appeared in three episodes. In his first appearance, the season 1 finale "Dudley and the Dodo", The Dodo thinks that Dudley is his mother. However, The Dodo quickly learned otherwise, and became good friends with Dudley and Sally. In his next appearance, "Dudley's Amazing Journey", we learn that the Dodo lives in a cave, and has a love for worms and jelly beans. The Dodo finds himself in danger in his last appearance, "The Royal Crown", where the Prince tries to pluck the Dodo's feathers as decorations for his crown. However, the Prince quickly learned that the Dodo's feather mean a lot to the Dodo, and ultimately decides not to pull the Dodo's feathers.
- Didi the Woodpecker – Wende Welch (Season 1), Sue Morrison (Seasons 1–2). A colourful female woodpecker who appeared occasionally during the first two seasons. Her first appearance was in the episode "Mr. Crabby Tree" (where she was portrayed by Wende Welch), and her last appearance was in the season 2 finale, "Imagine That!". In the French version of the series, Didi was renamed "Madame Lepic".
- Katrina the Whale – Wende Welch (Season 1), Sue Morrison (Seasons 1–3). A whale that lived in the ocean and only appeared in a few episodes. She first appeared in the second episode, "Dudley's Tea Party" (where she was portrayed by Wende Welch), and made her last appearance, a short non-speaking cameo, in the episode "Mr. Crabby Tree's Really Great Adventure". In the French version of the series, Katrina was named "Irène".
- Rosie the Skunk – Sue Morrison (Seasons 1 and 5). A sassy skunk who only appeared in two episodes, "Dudley Goes Camping" and "Doggone Dragon". In the French version of the series, her name was spelled "Rosi".
- Bernardo – James Rankin (Season 2). Sammy's Italian cousin. Appeared in the episode "Dudley and the Great Race".
- Kostus – James Rankin (Season 2). Sammy's Greek cousin. Appeared in the episode "Dudley and the Great Race".
- Radar the Dog – James Rankin (Season 2). A computer character created by Terry who appeared in the episode "Dudley and Flammo the Magician".
- Rita the Frog – James Rankin (Season 4). A First Nations frog who bears a strong resemblance to Sammy. However, when Dudley brings up Sammy, Rita claims that she's never heard of him. Like Sammy, Rita is musically gifted (she plays the drum). She only appeared in one episode, "Mama Crabby Tree".

=== The kids ===
- Sally – Asia Vieira (Seasons 1–5). A friendly, fun-loving girl, and Dudley's best friend. She was the first person that Dudley met when he woke up from his hibernation. Sally is a responsible person, often acting as an older sister to Dudley and some of the other characters. Sally is into gymnastics, as seen in the episodes "Mr. Crabby Tree's Really Great Adventure" and "The Red Sneakers". Sally also has a bag that coincidentally always has a specific item needed for a specific adventure. Sally's bag was a running gag throughout the series, with the mention of it often leading to somebody saying, "I've got to get one of those bags". Sally appeared in most of the episodes from the first two seasons, but appeared less in the remaining three seasons (five in season 3, two in season 4, and two in season 5). The reason for Sally's fewer appearances in later seasons most likely had to do with the lack of availability of Asia Vieira, who was working on several other projects around the same time. She was also featured in the series' final episode. For the first season of the short-lived French version of the series, Sally was named "Sophie", and was portrayed by Annick Obonsawin. During the second season of the French series, she was renamed "Annick", and was portrayed by future Dudley regular Andréanne Bendir. An older version of Sally (portrayed by Marcia Bennett in the English version, and Louise Nolan in the French version) appeared in the episode "Dudley Through the Looking Glass".
- Matt – Daniel DeSanto (Seasons 1–3). Sally's brother and an aspiring detective. Whenever some sort of strange situation occurs, Matt will often say, "A mystery! Let's investigate!" Matt will then try to solve the 'mystery', often with the help of his sister. Like Sally, Matt appeared in most of the episodes during the first two seasons. However, he too made fewer appearances after the second season. Like Asia Vieira, this most likely had to do with DeSanto's commitments to other projects at the time (which included the voice of Carlos on The Magic School Bus, and portraying Tucker in the series Are You Afraid of the Dark?). Matt only appeared in three episodes during the third season ("The Spooky Castle", "The Tree House", and "Mr. Crabby Tree's Really Great Adventure") before vanishing from the series altogether (although he would be mentioned a few times by other characters in future episodes). For the first season of the short-lived French version of the series, Matt was named "Max", and was portrayed by Anael G. Roy. During the second season of the French series, he was renamed "Mathieu", and was portrayed by Owen Leitch.
- Terry – Robin Weekes (Seasons 2–5). A clever boy, with a wristwatch computer and a knack for inventing things. Terry first appeared in the season 2 episode "Dudley and Flammo the Magician", but his official introduction was in the season 2 finale, "Imagine That!". In the episode, Terry is introduced as a loner with an asocial personality, who isn't that fond of the activities that Dudley and the others take part in. However, Dudley's friendly personality brings Terry into befriending the gang. While Terry could still have his moments of pessimism, he would take part in Dudley's adventures just as much as the other kids would, with his computing knowledge being a great help. In the episode "Dudley and the Tooth Fairy", Terry helps Chloe the tooth fairy get her wings. Terry continued to appear regularly for the remainder of the series, making his last appearance in the episode "Dudley and the Knight Club". In the short-lived French version of the series, Terry was renamed "Bastien", and was portrayed by Barnabè Geisweiller.
- Mickey – Daniel Tordjman-Goodfellow (Seasons 3–5). Making his first introduction in the season 3 premiere, "The Living Doll", Mickey more or less took over the 'aspiring detective' role previously handled by Matt. Mickey was often friendly and helpful, but sometimes mischievous, as evidenced in the episode "The Boy Who Cried Witch". In the episode, Mickey has a bad habit of telling tall tales, but eventually learns his lesson. He has a love for sports, particularly basketball and baseball. Mickey also seems to look up to Terry as an older brother, trying to be like him in the episode "Dudley and the Lost City". Like Terry, he continued to appear regularly for the remainder of the series. His last appearance was in the episode "Spooky Birthday".
- Julia – Natasha Greenblatt (Seasons 3–5). Julia was originally introduced in the season 3 premiere "The Living Doll". In the episode, Julia is introduced as a doll who wants to be a human again after the troll turned her into a doll. With the help of Dudley and Mickey, she comes to life. Strangely, after her introduction, Julia's past life as a doll was never mentioned again. In fact, in some later episodes, it's implied that Julia lives a pretty normal life (it's said that she has parents in "Dudley and the Tooth Fairy", and she mentions having a sister in the episode "Lullaby Dragon"). In most of her earlier appearances, Julia was depicted as the youngest of the group, the curious one who often had to be looked after by Dudley and the older kids. However, as time went on, Julia began to more or less occupy a similar role to Sally's, acting as a good friend and replacement older sister to Dudley. Like Terry and Mickey, Julia appeared regularly throughout the remainder of the series, her last appearance being in the series' final episode.
- Laura – Andréanne Bénidir (Seasons 4–5). Laura had a very similar personality to Sally's, acting as an energetic older sister to Dudley. Ironically, Bénidir had portrayed Asia Vieira's French counterpart in the second and final season of the short-lived French Dudley/Arthur series, "Les Aventures d'Arthur le Dragon". It seems that Bénidir's addition to the English-language Dudley cast had to do with Vieira's absence from the series. Bénidir's Laura character had very similar traits to Sally, such as being good friends with the Dodo, and being described as Dudley's best friend. At the end of the episode "Dudley's Big Decision", Laura moves away to join her parents out East. Throughout the episode, Dudley is upset because he's afraid of losing his "best friend". At one point, Laura gives Dudley a photo of the two of them (actually a photo of Dudley and Bénidir taken from an episode of the French Dudley/Arthur series). Also of interest is that in the opening scene of the series final episode, Sally meets up with Dudley, and the two act as though they haven't seen each other in a long time. All of this could lead to the possibility that "Dudley's Big Decision" was originally written for Asia Vieira's Sally. Whatever the case, both Laura continued to appear regularly during the fifth season (and finally appeared with Sally in one episode, "The Great Dragonberry War"). Her first appearance was in the fourth-season episode "The Royal Crown". Her last appearance was in the second-to-last episode "Lullaby Dragon".

=== Recurring characters ===
These characters, while mostly portrayed by well-known performers, made several appearances throughout the series.

- Mr. Crabby Tree – Graham Greene (Seasons 1–5). A grouchy, wisecracking tree who made his first introduction in the third episode, "Mr. Crabby Tree". Mr. Crabby Tree, while frequently in a bad mood, still has his good side. He does often act as a mentor to Dudley and the kids, and even once called Dudley his best friend. In the episode "Mr. Crabby Tree's Really Great Adventure", Mr. Crabby Tree made a wish on a shooting star that for one day, he would be able to move around and do all of the things he wanted to do. A running gag during the fourth season involved Mr. Crabby Tree's ability to walk, despite returning to life as a stand-still tree at the end of “Mr. Crabby Tree’s Really Great Adventure”. Oftentimes, a character would question how Mr. Crabby Tree is able to walk, which would be followed by a brief excuse from Mr. Crabby Tree (i.e. finding a lucky four-leaf clover, borrowing a luck rabbit's foot, etc.). In the episode "The Wishing Well", Mr. Crabby Tree made yet another wish, this time to be human. However, Mr. Crabby Tree quickly grew tired of life as a human, and by the end of the episode, went back to living as a tree. Mr. Crabby Tree's mother (also played by Graham Greene) appeared in the episode "Mama Crabby Tree". Mr. Crabby Tree's last appearance was in the episode "The Boy Who Cried Witch". In the short-lived French version of the series, Mr. Crabby Tree was named "M. Pommier-Grognon". Unlike most of the other actors in the series, Graham Greene actually played his role in both the English and French versions of the series (though his voice was dubbed in the French version).
- The Caveman – Martin Julien (Seasons 3–5). The Caveman is a friendly caveman who first appeared in the episode "Dudley and the Caveman". In the episode, The Caveman is introduced as a bully who constantly picks on other characters, and even steals Freddy Bear from Dudley. However, Dudley learns to be nice to the Caveman, and eventually the two become good friends. In all future episodes with the Caveman, he's friendly and helpful. Like Dudley, The Caveman has a love for dragonberries. This once led to an argument between the two in the episode "The Great Dragonberry War", where Dudley and the Caveman fight over ownership of a dragonberry bush. Despite this argument, Dudley and the Caveman are almost always the best of friends. The Caveman often speaks in "caveman talk", talking in third person, among other things. His last appearance was in the episode "The Pumpkin King".
- The Troll – Martin Julien (costume) and Patrick McKenna (costume and voice, and later voice only) (Seasons 2–5). A rather grumpy, but magicical troll who always cooks up different potions for different purposes. Despite the Troll meaning well, his magic often backfires, resulting in some sort tragedy. Patrick McKenna originally performed in the Troll's costume and did the Troll's voice at the same time. Later, Martin Julien took over the costume, but McKenna still provided the Troll's voice. He made his first appearance in the season 2 episode "Dudley and the Gingerbread House" and made his last appearance in the season 5 episode "Doggone Dragon". In the latter episode, the Troll accidentally turns himself into a dog named Buster. Buster was portrayed by Cliff Saunders. In the French version of the series, the Troll was named "Le Sorcier".
- The Prince – Jesse Collins (Seasons 3–5). The Prince is the oldest son and heir apparent to the King of All Living Things. He is a generally stuck-up, arrogant character who finds himself incredibly handsome. The Prince often finds himself going by tradition and his arrogant instincts until Dudley and the gang teach him a lesson. The Prince has done his share of nasty things such as cheating in a foot race against Dudley, not inviting Julia to a ball because of her gender, and wanting to pull off the feathers of the Dodo in order to make a decoration for his crown. However, by the end of every episode, the Prince learns his lesson, proving that, like most of the show's villains, he was merely misguided rather than evil. The Prince made his first appearance in the episode "The Frog Princess", and his last appearance in the episode "Cinderella Ha-Ha".
- Chloe the Fairy – Anne-Marie MacDonald (Seasons 4–5). Chloe is a rather sarcastic, but responsible and well-meaning fairy who doubles as both a fairy godmother and a tooth fairy. Originally, Chloe didn't have her fairy wings, but with the help of Dudley and Terry, she finally managed to earn them. Chloe appeared in three episodes, "Dudley and the Tooth Fairy", "Alphabet Dragon", and "Cinderella Ha-Ha".
- Aggie – Jackie Burroughs (Seasons 1–2). Aggie is an adventure specialist who would sometimes join Dudley in his adventures. She appeared in four episodes: "High Flyin' Dragon", "Dudley in the Rainforest", "Dragons Ahoy!", and "Dudley and the Great Race". For her first two appearances in the French version of the series, Aggie was renamed "Rosi", and was portrayed by Marthe Moliki-Sassa. For her latter three appearances, she was renamed "Vivi", and was played by Lyne Tremblay.

=== Guest stars ===
- The Genie – Sky Gilbert (Seasons 1 and 3). A trouble-making Genie who appeared in two episodes. In his first appearances, "Dudley and the Genie", the Genie tries to get Dudley to waste his energy resources. The Genie eventually returned to his lamp, but was released when Dudley came upon the lamp in the episode "The Red Sneakers". In that episode, the Genie convinced Dudley, Sally and Mickey (and unsuccessfully tried to convince Sammy and Julia) to replace practicing for physical activities with a pair of magical red sneakers. In the end, Julia wishes for a pair of red sneakers for the Genie. The Genie winds up going out of control, and agrees to get rid of all of the red sneakers. Julia wishes for the sneakers to be off of everyone but the Genie. Ultimately, the Genie is stuck with the out-of-control sneakers. His fate afterwards is unknown. It is also unknown who portrayed the Genie in the short-lived French version of the series. He was the first antagonist in the series.
- Clarence the Can – Ed Sahely (Season 1). A talking trash can who appeared in the episode "Dudley Meets Mr. Can".
- The Tiny Giant – Gary Farmer (Season 1). A normal-sized "giant" who appeared in the episode "Dudley Meets a Tiny Giant". In the French version of the series, he was portrayed by Bernard Gagnon.
- Vernon the Toxin – Earl Pastko (Season 1). A scary skeleton-like character that appeared in Dudley's nightmare in the episode "Dudley and the Toxins". Earl Pastko reprised his role for the French version of the episode, with his voiced dubbed by another actor.
- The Face of Nature – Jackie Richardson (Season 1). Appeared in the episode "Dudley Goes Camping". In the French version "Visage de la Nature" was portrayed by Louise Shekter, who directed and adapted many of the episodes for the French version of Dudley.
- The Snowman – Keith Knight (Season 2). Appeared in the episode "Dudley and the Snowman".
- The King of All Living Things – Jan Rubeš (Season 2). The King appeared in the episode "Dudley and the King", where he attempted to take down Mr. Crabby Tree. He is the father of the Prince. In the French version of the series, he was portrayed by René Lemieux.
- The Leprechaun – Eric Peterson (Seasons 2 and 3). A mischievous leprechaun who is able to produce magic, as well as transport from place to place, and even shift in size, by saying his name ("McCopper Bequick"). Dudley first met him in the episode "Dudley and the Leprechaun". The Leprechaun had a bad habit of smoking, and at the end of the episode promised Dudley that he would give up smoking. He returned in the episode "The Tree House", where it's revealed that he did not keep his promise. Dudley and Matt tried unsuccessfully to catch the Leprechaun, but Julia eventually managed to catch him. The Leprechaun later invited Dudley, Matt and Julia to his home (in a tree) for some tea, but quickly turns them off, as his home is filled with cigarette smoke. The Leprechaun promised to transport Dudley and co. out of his home, but unfortunately bumped his head before he was able to do that. The bump caused the Leprechaun to forget his name, which meant that the gang had to take venture through the Leprechaun's entire smoke-filled house for an exit. The bump also caused the Leprechaun to wonder why he began smoking in the first place, and eventually led to him giving up smoking altogether. In the French version of the series, the Leprechaun was portrayed by Olivier L'Ècuyer, who also dubbed Dudley's voice for the French series.
- Pablo Pickle – Diego Matamoros (Season 2). A famous artist who appeared in the episode "Dudley Meets Pablo Pickle". Mr. Pickle turned out to be prejudiced, as evident by his hatred for the color green (including a dislike towards both Dudley and Sammy). However, Dudley and the gang taught Mr. Pickle to love everyone, no matter how different they are. In the French version of the series, "Pablo Picot" was played by Daniel Richer.
- Flammo the Magician – Clark Johnson (Season 2). A magician who appeared in the episode "Dudley and Flammo the Magician". Flammo was initially a threat to the woods, as he dangerously used flammable material in his act. After his wand is destroyed, Flammo decides against using fire. Angelo Cadet portrayed the character in the French version of the series.
- The Alien – Julian Richings (Season 2). An alien from outer space who appeared in the episode "Dudley Meets the Alien". Julian Richings reprised his role for the French version, with his voice dubbed by a French actor.
- The Daisy – Erica Luttrell (Season 3). A talking daisy whom Dudley and Mickey met in the episode "The Unhappy Garden". The Daisy was initially sick and covered in colorful spots (due to Dudley carelessly throwing away water filled with paint).
- Lola the Butterfly – Diane Flacks (Season 3). A happy-go-lucky butterfly who appeared in the episode "The Unhappy Garden". Lola is an expert flyer, and also cares greatly about the garden that she lives in.
- Venus Flytrap – Diane Flacks (Season 3). An extremely happy, wisecracking Venus flytrap who appeared in the episode "The Unhappy Garden".
- The Rose Queen – Diane Flacks (Season 3). A rose that acts as the Queen of a garden. She appeared in the episode "The Unhappy Garden".
- Lou the Lion – Saul Rubinek (Season 3). A friendly, happy-go-lucky lion who befriended Dudley and Mickey in the episode "Dudley and the Lion".
- Princess Pureheart – Mary Walsh (Season 3). Appeared in the episode "The Frog Princess". She was originally a frog who was turned into a human Princess thanks to a kiss from the Prince. The Princess tried several attempts to make the Prince fall in love with her, but the attempts failed due to the Prince's dislike towards Pureheart's frog-like behaviour. The Prince led Princess Pureheart to believe that she was not of pure heart, but Dudley, Julia and Sammy convinced her otherwise. The Princess has a very friendly, upbeat personality, but often displays frog-like mannerisms (particularly a bad habit of eating flies).
- The Bear – Andrew Massingham (Season 4). A bear who is good friends with Caveman. Appeared in the episode "You and Me and Caveman Makes Three".
- The Tiny Raincloud – Robin Duke (Season 4). A raincloud who appeared in the episode "Dudley and the Tiny Raincloud". She wound up leaving the woods after Dudley, Julia and Mickey hurt her feelings. The three eventually learned the importance of rain, and managed to convince the Raincloud to return.
- The Brave Sir Pointdexter of Knot – Albert Schultz (Season 4), Peter Keleghan (Season 5). Also known as "Pointy". A brave, but somewhat arrogant knight who first appeared in the episodes "Good Knight Dragon", where he was portrayed by Albert Schultz. In the episode, it is revealed that dragons and knights never got along with each other. As a result, Pointy and Dudley initially did not see eye-to-eye. But the two eventually became friends. Pointy returned for the episode "Dudley and the Knight Club", where he was portrayed by Peter Keleghan. In the episode, Pointy is the founder of the Knight Club, an organization for people who are considered "cool". Terry is initially a member of this club, but eventually quits after seeing the mean tricks Pointy pulls on people, including several tricks used to initiate Dudley into the club. Dudley also eventually learns of Pointy's mean-spiritedness, and quits the club shortly after being accepted.
- Sabrina the Clown – Linda Kash (Season 4). A circus clown who showed up in the forest in the episode "Dudley and the Balloon Forest". Sabrina had a need for being funny, which eventually led to trouble. She began to pull off a few mean-spirited pranks on the Troll, even going so far as to steal the Troll's book of magic. Things only got worse when she accidentally turned both Mrs. Robin and Sally into balloons. Like most of the characters in the series, Sabrina eventually learned her lesson.
- Catherine Two Birds Flying – Michelle St. John (Season 4). Also known as "Cathy". A First Nation who helped Mr. Crabby Tree find his mother in the episode "Mama Crabby Tree".
- Mama Crabby Tree – Graham Greene (Season 4). Mr. Crabby Tree's mother, who appeared at the end of the episode "Mama Crabby Tree".
- Jacob Spookem – Greg Thomey (Season 5). A deceased lumberjack who eventually revised as a ghost. Appeared in the episode "Dudley and the Cowardly Ghost". Spookem was initially a coward, but found his courage with the help of Dudley, Mickey, and Laura.
- The Sprite - Catherine Fitch (Season 5). Lived inside of a necklace that the Troll created in the episode "Dudley's Big Decision". In the episode, Dudley asked the Troll to help stop Laura from moving away. The Sprite used hypnotic poems in order to force Laura to stay in the forest. The Sprite eventually caused Laura to become a temperamental loner. With the help of Dudley, Laura was able to get rid of the necklace, causing the Sprite to vanish.
- Gabby Tree – Sheila McCarthy (Season 5). A female talking tree whom Mr. Crabby Tree attempted to pursue in the episode "Mr. Crabby Tree Falls in Love". Gabby Tree is essentially a female counterpart to Crabby Tree. She was initially turned off by Crabby Tree, but he eventually won her over.
- Buster the Dog – Cliff Saunders (Season 5). Buster is actually what the Troll turned into in the episode "Doggone Dragon" after a mishap in one of his experiments.
- The Face in the Well – Jackie Richardson (which herself sings the series' theme music) (Season 5). The face inside of a wishing well in the episode "The Wishing Well". Granted Mr. Crabby Tree his wish to become a human being, and later changed him back into a tree after he learned that he preferred his old life.
- Willomena the Witch – Mary Walsh (Season 5). A mischievous witch who appeared in the episodes: "The Boy Who Cried Witch", "The Pumpkin King", and "Spooky Birthday". She is the most antagonistic of her family, ahead of her sister, Ernestina.
- Ernestina the Witch – Cathy Jones (Season 5). Willomena's sister, who also appeared in the episodes: "The Boy Who Cried Witch", "The Pumpkin King", and "Spooky Birthday". While often assisting her sister in evil schemes, Ernestina also tends to be a little more worldly and generous.
- The Pumpkin King – John Neville (Season 5). Appeared in the episodes "The Pumpkin King" and "Spooky Birthday".
- The Scarecrow – Daniel Kash (Season 5). Appeared in the episodes "The Pumpkin King" and "Spooky Birthday".
- The Great Mezmra the Fortuneteller – Rick Mercer (Season 5). A fortune teller who tricks Dudley into joining his sideshow in the series' final episode, "The Last Dudley". He was the last antagonist in the series.

== Episodes ==
=== Season 1 (1993) ===
Episode #	Title	Summary	Characters	Written/directed by	Original airdate
1	"Dudley Finds His Home"	Dudley emerges from a 100-century slumber and finds to his horror that everything has changed. It's up to two children (who are as amazed at Dudley as he is about this new world) to convince Dudley that he is still on familiar ground. First appearances of Dudley, Sally, Matt, Mr. and Mrs. Robin and Sammy.	Dudley the Dragon; Sally; Matt; Mr. Robin; Mrs. Robin; Sammy the Frog	Written by: Alex Galatis; Directed by: Stan Swan	
2	"Dudley's Tea Party"	A planned tea party goes awry when all the water around Dudley dries up. First appearance of Katrina the Whale.	Dudley the Dragon; Sally; Matt; Mr. Robin; Mrs. Robin; Sammy the Frog; Katrina the Whale	Written by: Alex Galatis; Louise Shekter (French adaptation); Directed by: Richard Mortimer; Louise Shekter (French director)	
3	"Mr. Crabby Tree"	Mr. Crabby Tree gets his first appearance on the show and he ends up leaving Dudley spinning through the tree rings of time! Now, Dudley must try to do what he can do to get back to his own home timeline. First appearances of Mr. Crabby Tree and Didi the Woodpecker.	Dudley the Dragon; Sally; Matt; Didi the Woodpecker; Guest Starring: Graham Greene as Mr. Crabby Tree	Written by: Alex Galatis Directed by: Richard Mortimer	
4	"Dudley and the Genie"	Is it all too good to be true for after Dudley finds a Genie? He really wants Dudley to waste his energy resources.	Dudley the Dragon; Sally; Matt; Mr. Robin; Mrs. Robin; Sammy the Frog; Guest Starring: Sky Gilbert as the Genie	Written by: Alex Galatis; Louise Shekter (French adaptation); Directed by: Stan Swan; Louise Shekter (French director)	
5	"Dudley Meets Mr. Can"	When Dudley awakes up of his birthday party, He runs into a nasty demeanour problem from his garbage can. Dudley says he's totally absolved from the blame for making a pile of garbage, but is he? He must find the real truth!	Dudley the Dragon; Sally; Matt; Mr. Robin; Mrs. Robin; Sammy the Frog; Featuring: Graham Greene as Mr. Crabby Tree; Guest Starring: Ed Sahely as Clarence the Can	Written by: Susin Nielsen; Louise Shekter (French adaptation); Directed by: Richard Mortimer; Louise Shekter (French director)	
6	"Dudley Gets a Tummy Ache"	When Dudley feels unwell, Sally plays detective, and then holds a trial to try to figure out who might've poisoned him. The true culprit catches everyone by surprise.	Dudley the Dragon; Sally; Matt; Mr. Robin; Mrs. Robin; Sammy the Frog; Featuring: Graham Greene as Mr. Crabby Tree	Written by: Alex Galatis Directed by: Stan Swan	
7	"Dudley Meets a Tiny Giant"	A Tiny Giant teaches Dudley several things about insects' relationship with plants.	Dudley the Dragon; Sally; Matt; Sammy the Frog; Guest Starring: Gary Farmer as the Tiny Giant	Written by: Alex Galatis; Louise Shekter (French adaptation); Directed by: Stan Swan; Louise Shekter (French director)	
8	"High Flyin' Dragon"	Dudley leases a hot-air balloon, and in it, he winds up in a breathtaking hazard. First appearance of Aggie.	Dudley the Dragon; Mr. Robin; Didi the Woodpecker; Guest Starring: Jackie Burroughs as Aggie	Written by: Alex Galatis; Louise Shekter (French adaptation); Directed by: Stan Swan; Louise Shekter (French director)	
9	"Dudley and the Toxin"	Dudley goes through one big time of a nightmare thanks to a poisonous substance called Vernon, that's causing it.	Dudley the Dragon; Sally; Matt; Mr. Robin; Mrs. Robin; Katrina the Whale; Guest Starring: Earl Pastko as Vernon the Toxin	Written by: Susin Nielsen; Louise Shekter (French adaptation); Directed by: Stan Swan; Louise Shekter (French director)	
10	"Dudley Goes Camping"	Dudley and Sally want their camp-out to go swimmingly, but not if the Face of Nature can help it. First appearance of Rosie the Skunk.	Dudley the Dragon; Sally; Matt; Rosie the Skunk; Guest Starring: Jackie Richardson as the Face of Nature	Written by: Robert Sandler and Allen Booth; Louise Shekter (French adaptation); Directed by: Stan Swan; Louise Shekter (French director)	
11	"Dudley in the Rainforest"	Dudley and Aggie are forced into a rainforest on a rescue mission, while trying to describe a lapsing into the normal diatribes. First appearance of Yammi.	Dudley the Dragon; Sally; Mr. Robin; Mrs. Robin; Yammi the Frog; Featuring: Jackie Burroughs as Aggie	Written by: Robert Sandler and Allen Booth; Louise Shekter (French adaptation); Directed by: Stan Swan; Louise Shekter (French director)	
12	"Dudley and the Dodo"	What's Dudley doing with a dodo? And what's the dodo doing with the notion that Dudley is his mother? Is this too good to be real? Find out! First appearance of the Dodo.	Dudley the Dragon; Sally; Matt; Sammy the Frog Didi the Woodpecker; The Dodo	Written by: Alex Galatis; Louise Shekter (French adaptation); Directed by: Stan Swan; Louise Shekter (French director)	

=== Season 2 (1994) ===
Episode #	Title	Summary	Characters	Written/directed by	Original airdate
13	"Dudley and the Gingerbread House"	Dudley and Sally don't realize that the troll that they met, is really trying to use them in order to get a horrible "recipe"! First appearance of the Troll.	Dudley the Dragon; Sally; Matt; Mr. Robin; Mrs. Robin; Sammy the Frog; Guest Starring: Patrick McKenna as the Troll	Written by: Alex Galatis; Louise Shekter (French adaptation); Directed by: Allan Novak; Louise Shekter (French director)	
14	"Dudley and the Snowman"	Dudley and the others build a snowman and try to prevent him from melting via a refrigerated dome built from old fridge parts, inadvertently producing chlorofluorocarbons. Spring, which the snowman wants to see, does not come as a result of ozone depletion and the snowman acquiesces his fate and requests the dome be shut down.	Dudley the Dragon; Sally; Matt; Featuring: Graham Greene as Mr. Crabby Tree; Guest Starring: Keith Knight as the Snowman	Written by: Alex Galatis Directed by: Allan Novak	
15	"Dudley Through the Looking Glass"	What Grandpa Robin's mirror shows Dudley is understanding for senior citizens. First appearance of Grandpa Robin.	Dudley the Dragon; Old Dudley the Dragon; Sally; Grandpa Robin Sammy the Frog; Old Sammy the Frog; Guest Starring: Marcia Bennett as Old Sally	Written by: Alex Galatis; Louise Shekter and Danielle Bouchard (French adaptation); Directed by: Allan Novak; Louise Shekter (French director)	
16	"Dudley and the King"	It's good to be the king, thinks the King of All Living Things. He is intent on taking down Mr. Crabby Tree, thinking he's nothing but trouble, but Dudley and friends know better.	Dudley the Dragon; Sally; Mrs. Robin Sammy the Frog; Featuring: Graham Greene as Mr. Crabby Tree; Guest Starring: Jan Rubeš as the King of All Living Things	Written by: Alex Galatis; Louise Shekter (French adaptation); Directed by: Stan Swan; Louise Shekter (French director)	
17	"Have Yourself a Crabby Little Christmas"	Dudley and friends prepare for Christmas time, but Mr. Crabby Tree plans to ruin the holiday with his crabby apples.	Dudley the Dragon; Sally; Matt; Mr. Robin; Mrs. Robin; Sammy the Frog; Didi the Woodpecker; Featuring: Graham Greene as Mr. Crabby Tree; Guest Starring: Geraint Wyn Davies as the Narrator	Written by: Alex Galatis; Louise Shekter (French adaptation); Directed by: Stan Swan; Louise Shekter (French director)	
18	"Dudley and the Leprechaun"	Nothing but bad luck of the "Irish" here, as a leprechaun does his smoke-and-mirrors act, much to the hindrance of others' health.	Dudley the Dragon; Sally; Matt; Didi the Woodpecker; Guest Starring: Eric Peterson as the Leprechaun	Written by: Alex Galatis; Louise Shekter (French adaptation); Directed by: Stan Swan; Louise Shekter (French director)	
19	"Dragons Ahoy!"	Dudley is on the voyage that could cost him his life. Something has to be done to cure his "flu." And even if he gets cured, it won't change the people who wish to endanger his health, as we shall soon see and find out what happens.	Dudley the Dragon; Matt; Mr. Robin; Katrina the Whale; Featuring: Jackie Burroughs as Aggie	Written by: Alex Galatis; Louise Shekter (French adaptation); Directed by: Stan Swan; Louise Shekter (French director)	
20	"Dudley and the Great Race"	Two teams of two stage an around-the-world race between a hot-air balloon and a faulty car. It's not so much a need for speed in this duel, as Dudley and Sally learn to their dismay. Last appearance of Aggie.	Dudley the Dragon; Sally; Matt; Sammy the Frog; Featuring: Jackie Burroughs as Aggie	Written by: Alex Galatis; Louise Shekter and Danielle Bouchard (French adaptation); Directed by: Stan Swan; Louise Shekter (French director)	
21	"Dudley Meets Pablo Pickle"	Dudley and friends have heard nothing but wonderful stories about the artist Pablo Pickle. What they don't know is that Pablo doesn't care to paint the colour green, much to Dudley's dismay.	Dudley the Dragon; Sally; Matt; Mr. Robin; Mrs. Robin; Sammy the Frog; Guest Starring: Diego Matamoros as Pablo Pickle	Written by: Luciano Casimiri; Louise Shekter (French adaptation); Directed by: Stan Swan; Louise Shekter (French director)	
22	"Dudley Makes a Movie"	Dudley assigns a role for everyone in the movie he plans to shoot. But something about Sally's role is just not right.	Dudley the Dragon; Sally; Matt; Sammy the Frog; Didi the Woodpecker; Katrina the Whale	Written by: Tess Fragoulis Directed by: Stan Swan	
23	"Dudley and Flammo the Magician"	A magical musical act comes to the woods and proves to be hazardous. There's no way anyone can confuse "flammable" and "inflammable" when all this is over. First appearance of Terry.	Dudley the Dragon; Terry; Mr. Robin Mrs. Robin Radar the Dog; Guest Starring: Clark Johnson as Flammo the Magician	Written by: Alex Galatis; Louise Shekter (French adaptation); Directed by: Stan Swan; Louise Shekter (French director)	
24	"Dudley Meets the Alien"	An unfriendly alien tries to take command of the woods in general and of Sally and Terry in particular.	Dudley the Dragon; Sally; Terry; Mr. Robin; Guest Starring: Julian Richings as the Alien	Written by: Siobhan Flanagan; Louise Shekter (French adaptation); Directed by: Stan Swan; Louise Shekter (French director)	
25	"Imagine That!"	Dudley holds another tea party, This time it's complete with big games. It seems that Terry doesn't want to join in, though, thinking their games are too silly. First official introduction of Terry, despite having already appeared in a few episodes. Last appearance of Didi.	Dudley the Dragon; Sally; Terry Grandpa Robin; Didi the Woodpecker	Written by: Louise Shekter (English and French adaptations); Directed by: Stan Swan; Louise Shekter (French director)	

=== Season 3 (1995) ===
Episode #	Title	Summary	Characters	Written/directed by	Original airdate
26	"The Living Doll"	The Troll turned Julia from an human into a doll that has feelings. She also needs Dudley's help to solve a problem. The first appearances of Julia and Mickey.	Dudley the Dragon; Julia; Mickey; Katrina the Whale; Featuring: Martin Julien and Patrick McKenna as the Troll	Written by: Alex Galatis Directed by: Sue Brophey	
27	"The Spooky Castle"	It's Halloween Night for Dudley and the company, and everyone dresses up in their costumes! But it seems that Dudley may probably not be ready for what scary things haunts ahead. Sally tells the gang a scary story involving them exploring a spooky old castle. Grandpa Robin teaches Dudley that sometimes it's fun to be scared.	Dudley the Dragon; Sally; Matt; Terry; Julia; Grandpa Robin	Written by: Alex Galatis; Directed by: Sue Brophey	
28	"The Tree House"	Once again the leprechaun is out and about, blowing second-hand smoke everywhere, much to the dismay of Dudley and friends. After the leprechaun is caught by Julia, he invites her, Dudley, and Matt to his home inside of a tree. The group find out that the leprechaun's home is filled with cigarette smoke, they want out. Unfortunately, the leprechaun gets a bump on the head, causing him forget his name (the only way for him to use his magic is by saying his name). The only way to escape is by climbing all the way to the top of tree.	Dudley the Dragon; Matt; Julia; Mr. Robin; Featuring: Eric Peterson as the Leprechaun	Written by: Alex Galatis; Directed by: Sue Brophey	
29	"The Unhappy Garden"	A garden weeps for a clean environment. A friendly butterfly, with help from Dudley and Mickey, tries to solve the garden's dilemma. Along the way, Dudley and Mickey meet a troubled daisy, a silly Venus flytrap, and the Rose Queen.	Dudley the Dragon; Mickey; Guest Starring: Erica Luttrell as the Daisy and Diane Flacks as Lola the Butterfly, Venus Flytrap and the Rose Queen	Written by: Tess Fragoulis; Directed by: Dennis Saunders	
30	"Dudley and the Lion"	Dudley and Mickey are taught (with help from their new friend Lou the Lion) the need to be safe. When the two first meet Lou, they help him get a thorn out of his paw. Lou remains loyal to his new pals, and even pitches gives the two a helping hand when their kite gets loose.	Dudley the Dragon; Mickey; Mr. Robin; Mrs. Robin; Sammy the Frog; Guest Starring: Saul Rubinek as Lou the Lion	Written by: Luciano Casimiri; Directed by: Sue Brophey	
31	"Mr. Crabby Tree's Really Great Adventure"	Mr. Crabby Tree sees a shooting star, and wishes that for one day, he could be able to move around. With the help of Dudley and the gang, Mr. Crabby Tree is able to do every physical activity he always wanted to do, including play tag, do gymnastics, dance, and go fishing (in a different way). The group even throw a surprise party for Mr. Crabby Tree in honor of his special day. The last appearances of Matt and Katrina.	Dudley the Dragon; Sally; Matt; Terry; Julia; Sammy the Frog; Katrina the Whale; Featuring: Graham Greene as Mr. Crabby Tree	Written by: Alex Galatis; Directed by: E. Jane Thompson	
32	"Once Upon a Time"	Dudley and Mr. Crabby Tree teach Julia the world of imagination hidden in reading books. The three read the story of Little Red Riding Hood. Julia imagines herself and her friends in the story; she and Dudley respectively play "Little Little Red Riding Hood" and "Little Big Red Riding Hood", while Sally portrays their mother, Sammy plays a reluctant Humpty Dumpty, and Mr. Crabby Tree takes on a dual role as the Wolf and the Grandmother.	Dudley the Dragon; Sally; Julia; Sammy the Frog; Featuring: Graham Greene as Mr. Crabby Tree	Written by: Alex Galatis; Directed by: Stan Swan	
33	"Dudley and the Caveman"	Dudley encounters a caveman who probably dates back further than Dudley. Turns out that caveman is really an unrighteous bully. He steals Dudley's beloved teddy bear, Freddy. Dudley and Mickey attempt to get Freddy back, and in the process, Dudley learns how to deal with a bully. The first appearance of the Caveman.	Dudley the Dragon; Mickey Mr. Robin Mrs. Robin; Sammy the Frog; Featuring: Graham Greene as Mr. Crabby Tree; Guest Starring: Martin Julien as the Caveman	Written by: Alex Galatis; Directed by: Stan Swan	
34	"Dudley's Amazing Journey"	There's a whole new world under the surface of the Earth, waiting for Dudley to visit it. He, Sally and Julia journey the centre of the Earth, and reunite with their old friend the Dodo. Meanwhile, Julia learns to be careful when exploring.	Dudley the Dragon; Sally; Julia; The Dodo	Written by: Alex Galatis; Directed by: Stan Swan	
35	"The Trouble with Bubbles"	Look underneath the bubble screen. Has Dudley broken a promise? Grandpa Robin treats Dudley and company to a special lunch of Giggle Soup and Bubble Pie. He has the gang promise not to eat too much of either dish, but Dudley just can't help himself. After flying high with bubbles from too much Bubble Pie, Dudley learns to keep his promise.	Dudley the Dragon; Julia; Mickey; Grandpa Robin Sammy the Frog	Written by: Alex Galatis; Directed by: Peter Williamson and Ira Levy	
36	"The Red Sneakers"	The biggest peace of mind comes from trying your best. Dudley, Sally and Mickey have to learn this in preparation for an athletic adventure, when a genie causes the group's activities to go out of control with a pair of red sneakers.	Dudley the Dragon; Sally; Julia; Mickey; Sammy the Frog; Featuring: Sky Gilbert as the Genie	Written by: Siobhan Flanagan; Directed by: Stan Swan	
37	"Dudley and the Lost City"	Dudley, Terry and Mickey find a map leading to the Lost City, and decide to follow it. But Terry isn't too happy about Mickey tagging along. While on their journey, the trio also have to search for Mr. Robin, who was also headed for the Lost City. Meanwhile, Terry learns to appreciate Mickey.	Dudley the Dragon; Terry; Mickey; Mr. Robin; Mrs. Robin; Yammi the Frog	Written by: Luciano Casimiri; Directed by: Stan Swan	
38	"The Frog Princess"	Previously a frog, Princess Pureheart returns to her initial human form after receiving a kiss from an arrogant Prince. She attempts to marry the Prince, but he is immediately turned off by her frog-like behaviour (notably, a bad habit of eating flies). Dudley, Julia and Sammy teach the Princess Pureheart to truly keep a pure heart, and to also respect herself, despite what others may think of her. The first appearance of the Prince.	Dudley the Dragon; Julia; Sammy the Frog; Guest Starring: Jesse Collins as the Prince and Mary Walsh as Princess Pureheart	Written by: Alex Galatis; Directed by: E. Jane Thompson	

=== Season 4 (1996) ===
Episode #	Title	Summary	Characters	Written/directed by	Original airdate
39	"The Royal Crown"	There is still a dodo lying around, and the Prince wants the dodo's feathers for his crown. As the Dodo is the last of his kind, this really puts him in danger. Eventually, The Dodo has no choice but to leave his home behind. But before he's able to leave, the Prince kidnaps him. It's up to Dudley, Laura, and Mickey to save their feathered friend. Eventually, the Prince learns that the Dodo's feathers are just as important to the Dodo has the Prince's crown is to himself. The first appearance of Laura. The last appearance of the Dodo.	Dudley the Dragon; Mickey; Laura; The Dodo; Featuring: Jesse Collins as the Prince	Written by: Siobhan Flanagan; Directed by: Steve Wright	
40	"You and Me and Caveman Makes Three"	Dudley and Laura plan a camping trip for just the two of them. But plans change when the lonely Caveman pays the two a visit. Laura warmly invites the Caveman to camp with them, much to Dudley's reluctance. Dudley grows jealous of Laura's attention towards the Caveman, but eventually learns the importance of friendship and respect towards others.	Dudley the Dragon; Laura; Grandpa Robin; Featuring: Martin Julien as the Caveman; Guest Starring: Andrew Massingham as the Bear	Written by: Luciano Casimiri; Directed by: Darrell Wasyk	
41	"Dudley's Birthday Surprise"	One of Dudley's favourite days of the year is his birthday. To celebrate, Sally bakes him a strawberry cake with dragonberry icing, Julia wraps presents, and Sammy decorates. At Dudley's party, he blows out the candles on his cake to make a wish and wishes every day could be his birthday. However, the more he wishes for his birthday everyday, the more bossy he becomes to his friends, saying if they don't do what he tells them to do, they can't come to his party. On his third birthday, Sally and Julia decide not to go to his party because of how bossy he's acting. To apologize for being bossy, Dudley throws Sally and Julia a birthday party with the cake they want to eat, the colour decorations they want, and play the games they want to play, making it a happy birthday for both the girls.	Dudley the Dragon; Sally; Julia; Sammy the Frog	Written by: Alex Galatis; Directed by: Peter Williamson	
42	"Dudley and the Tiny Raincloud"	Dudley wants the rain to stop, but that isn't at all what the forest wants. Certainly Mr. Crabby Tree is not pleased by the ensuing dry spell. Dudley, Julia and Mickey upset a tiny raincloud after telling it to go away. The gang learn that Mr. Crabby Tree could deteriorate without any water. They try to do all they can to get the raincloud to return, and when they finally succeed, there's just one hitch: the raincloud doesn't know how to rain. Can Dudley save the day?	Dudley the Dragon; Julia Mickey; Featuring: Graham Greene as Mr. Crabby Tree; Guest Starring: Robin Duke as the Tiny Raincloud	Written by: Alex Galatis; Directed by: Stan Swan	
43	"Dudley and the Tooth Fairy"	Dudley and Terry are put to the test when a tooth fairy does not have the sugar-coated image they had envisioned. Terry loses his tooth, and is advised by Dudley to put it under his pillow that night for the tooth fairy. Terry is initially skeptical of the tooth fairy's existence, but learns the truth when Chloe pays a visit. Unlike most fairies, Chloe doesn't have her wings, and has to spend the entire night traveling on soar feet. The only way for her to get her wings is to make all of her trips before morning. With the help of Dudley and Terry, Chloe finally becomes the fairy she always wanted to be. The first appearance of Chloe the Tooth Fairy.	Dudley the Dragon; Terry; Julia; Featuring: Martin Julien as the Caveman and the Troll and Patrick McKenna as the voice of the Troll; Guest Starring: Anne-Marie MacDonald as Chloe the Tooth Fairy	Written by: Alex Galatis; Directed by: Peter Williamson	
44	"Good Knight Dragon"	The forest is divided into factions, with Dudley on one side and a Knight his polar opposite–or is he?	Dudley the Dragon; Julia; Sammy the Frog; Featuring: Graham Greene as Mr. Crabby Tree; Guest Starring: Albert Schultz as the Knight	Written by: Luciano Casimiri; Directed by: Steve Webb	
45	"Dudley and the Balloon Forest"	A mischievous clown coaxes Dudley and Sally to take a Troll's magic spell book. What they get is definitely not a touch of brilliance.	Dudley the Dragon; Sally; Mr. Robin; Mrs. Robin; Featuring: Martin Julien as the Troll and Patrick McKenna as the voice of the Troll; Guest Starring: Linda Kash as Sabrina the Clown	Written by: Alex Galatis; Directed by: Peter Williamson	
46	"Mama Crabby Tree"	Dudley and Julia get Mr. Crabby Tree to learn about genealogy and Aboriginal culture.	Dudley the Dragon; Julia; Rita the Frog; Featuring: Graham Greene as Mr. Crabby Tree; Guest Starring: Graham Greene as Mama Crabby Tree and Michelle St. John as Catherine	Written by: Alex Galatis; Directed by: Steve Swan	
47	"Sammy the Flying Frog"	Everyone goes on vacation, leaving Sammy alone until he vacates the forest for his own jaunt.	Dudley the Dragon; Julia; Mr. Robin; Mrs. Robin Sammy the Frog	Written by: Peter Williamson; Directed by: Peter Williamson	
48	"Junior Robin's Big Day Out"	Junior Robin, the infant son of Mr. and Mrs. Robin, is suddenly Dudley and Mickey's responsibility. The first appearance of Junior Robin.	Dudley the Dragon; Mickey; Mr. Robin; Mrs. Robin; Junior Robin	Written by: Peter Williamson; Directed by: Peter Williamson	
49	"Showbiz Dragon"	It's a common theme: conduct a show to raise support for the needy. Dudley is ready for his own Live Aid to help the Roin family. But he'll need Laura to step out of her stage fright.	Dudley the Dragon; Laura; Mr. Robin; Mrs. Robin Sammy the Frog; Featuring: Graham Greene as Mr. Crabby Tree and Martin Julien as the Caveman	Written by: Peter Williamson; Directed by: Peter Williamson	
50	"The Prince's New Clothes"	TV commercials are deceitful and dishonest about everything, say some. No one takes it to an extreme like Dudley, who wants to fool a Prince with his own brand of Deceit-O-Vision.	Dudley the Dragon; Terry; Mr. Robin; Mrs. Robin Sammy the Frog; Featuring: Jesse Collins as the Prince	Written by: Alex Galatis; Directed by: Peter Williamson	
51	"Alphabet Dragon"	Dudley makes a wish to his fairy godmother that he go to school. He is confronted with the challenges of learning and how those challenges can be overcome as easy as A-B-C.	Dudley the Dragon; Terry; Mickey; Grandpa Robin; Featuring: Anne-Marie MacDonald as Chloe the Fairy Godmother	Written by: Alex Galatis; Directed by: Peter Williamson	

=== Season 5 (1997) ===
Episode #	Title	Summary	Characters	Written/directed by	Original airdate
52	"Dudley and the Cowardly Ghost"	Dudley hears stories of a legendary ghost, but when he does meet "Jacob Spookem," he finds this ghost doesn't know how to scare people. It's up to Dudley, Laura, and Mickey to embolden him.	Dudley the Dragon; Mickey; Laura; Sammy the Frog; Guest Starring: Greg Thomey as Jacob Spookem the Cowardly Ghost	Written by: Alex Galatis; Directed by: Steve Wright	
53	"Dudley's Big Decision"	When Laura and her parents move away from the forest, Dudley seeks the Troll's help to ruin Laura's plans.	Dudley the Dragon; Terry; Laura; Featuring: Graham Greene as Mr. Crabby Tree, Martin Julien as the Troll and Patrick McKenna as the voice of the Troll; Guest Starring: Catherine Fitch as the Sprite	Written by: Alex Galatis (story); Kirk Dunn and Claire Dunn (teleplay); Directed by: Darrell Wasyk	
54	"Mr. Crabby Tree Falls in Love"	Who would have believed Mr. Crabby Tree would want to change his ways? He sheds his crabby ways on Valentine's Day in an effort to impress Gabby Tree, a lovely apple tree.	Dudley the Dragon; Julia; Featuring: Graham Greene as Mr. Crabby Tree; Guest Starring: Sheila McCarthy as Gabby Tree	Written by: Alex Galatis (story); Luciano Casmiri (teleplay); Directed by: Stan Swan	
55	"Doggone Dragon"	The mischievous Troll takes a turn for the worse as he tries to create a potion that will make him stronger. He turns himself into a dog, much to the delight of Dudley and Mickey. But Mickey will not be happy for long. The last appearances of the Troll and Rosie.	Dudley the Dragon; Terry; Mickey; Rosie the Skunk; Featuring: Martin Julien as the Troll and Patrick McKenna as the voice of the Troll; Guest Starring: Cliff Saunders as Buster the Dog	Written by: Alex Galatis; Directed by: Darrell Wasyk	
56	"The Royal Cup"	It's a Tortoise and the Hare story as Dudley and the Prince race for the Royal Cup. Watch and find out to see who wins!	Dudley the Dragon; Terry; Julia; Mr. Robin; Mrs. Robin Sammy the Frog; Featuring: Jesse Collins as the Prince	Written by: Alex Galatis (story); Luciano Casmiri (teleplay); Directed by: Jesse Collins	
57	"The Wishing Well"	Mr. Crabby Tree wants to roam around. When a wishing well grants him a human body, Mr. Crabby Tree soon regrets it. The last appearance of Grandpa Robin.	Dudley the Dragon; Laura; Grandpa Robin; Featuring: Graham Greene as Mr. Crabby Tree; Guest Starring: Jackie Richardson as the Face in the Well	Written by: Alex Galatis; Directed by: Stan Swan	
58	"Cinderella Ha-Ha"	The Prince commands a masquerade ball for his own amusement. This is evident when girls are deemed unfunny and are not considered for the ball. Chloe the Fairy Godmother has a plan in store for both the Prince and Julia to learn lessons. The last appearances of the Prince and Chloe.	Dudley the Dragon; Julia Mickey; Sammy the Frog; Featuring: Jesse Collins as the Prince and Anne-Marie MacDonald as Chloe the Fairy Godmother; Note: In the credits, Chloe's name is misspelled as "Chleo".	Written by: Alex Galatis; Directed by: Jesse Collins	
59	"Dudley and the Knight Club"	Dudley wants to become a Knight in armor to improve his image. That prompts a knight called Pointdexter to put Dudley through dangerous tests to prove himself worthy of knighthood. The last appearance of Terry.	Dudley the Dragon; Terry; Mickey; Sammy the Frog; Guest Starring: Peter Keleghan as Sir Pointdexter	Written by: Alex Galatis (story); Kirk Dunn and Claire Dunn (teleplay); Directed by: Darrell Wasyk	
60	"The Great Dragonberry War"	Dudley and the Caveman go to war over care of a dragonberry bush called "Priscilla."	Dudley the Dragon; Sally; Laura; Sammy the Frog; Featuring: Martin Julien as the Caveman	Written by: Alex Galatis (story); Daphne Ballon (teleplay); Directed by: Stan Swan	
61	"The Boy Who Cried Witch"	The first in a three-part saga finds Mickey making up stories about witches that are out to get everyone in the forest. Part 2 is the next episode below. The last appearance of Mr. Crabby Tree.	Dudley the Dragon; Mickey; Sammy the Frog; Featuring: Graham Greene as Mr. Crabby Tree; Guest Starring: Mary Walsh as Willomena the Witch and Cathy Jones as Ernestina the Witch	Written by: Alex Galatis; Directed by: Steve Wright	
62	"The Pumpkin King"	In the second part of the trilogy, Dudley, Laura and the Caveman all desire something badly à la The Wizard of Oz. They travel to the Pumpkin King, who will grant them their separate wishes if they can retrieve the hat of one of the witches who had threatened their habitat in the previous episode. The third and final part is the next episode below. The last appearance of the Caveman. Episode produced in memory of Dr. Irving Levy.	Dudley the Dragon; Laura; Featuring: Martin Julien as the Caveman, Mary Walsh as Willomena the Witch and Cathy Jones as Ernestina the Witch Guest Starring: John Neville as the Pumpkin King and Daniel Kash as the Scarecrow; Note: Daniel Tordjman-Goodfellow is listed as playing Mickey, despite being absent from this episode.	Written by: Alex Galatis; Directed by: Steve Wright	
63	"Spooky Birthday"	In the third and final part of the trilogy, Willomena and Ernestina were the twin witches who had victimized Dudley and his friends. Now the two witches want to hold a birthday party. It seems impossible for the witches to agree on even that, and now Dudley and his friends may have to go what's coming up to them, by paying the price and that might cost their lives! The last appearance of Mickey.	Dudley the Dragon; Julia Mickey; Laura; Sammy the Frog; Featuring: Mary Walsh as Willomena the Witch, Cathy Jones as Ernestina the Witch, John Neville as the Pumpkin King and Daniel Kash as the Scarecrow	Written by: Alex Galatis; Directed by: Steve Wright	
64	"Lullaby Dragon"	Dudley's plans for a sleepover with his friends seems in jeopardy when he discovers he has lost his comforting teddy bear! Now Dudley will have to look for it! The last appearances of Laura, Sammy, and Junior Robin.	Dudley the Dragon; Julia; Laura; Mrs. Robin; Junior Robin Sammy the Frog; Note: Strangely, the end credits list Asia Vieira as Sally, rather than Andréanne Bénidir as Laura.	Written by: Alex Galatis; Directed by: Andrew Ainsworth	
65	"The Last Dudley"	This is the last episode to be produced and aired in the television series. Dudley needs companionship from another dragon. This prompts a fortune-teller called the Great Mezmra to snare Dudley into his side show with the promise that they would find another dragon. The last appearances of Dudley, Sally, Julia, Mr. and Mrs. Robin, and Yammi.	Dudley the Dragon; Sally; Julia; Mr. Robin; Mrs. Robin; Yammi the Frog; Unnamed Dragon; Guest Starring: Rick Mercer as The Great Mezmra the Fortuneteller; Note: During the final scene, Dudley sees images of his "true dragon friends"; the following characters appear: Chloe the Fairy Godmother (Anne-Marie MacDonald), Mr. Crabby Tree (Graham Greene), Matt (Daniel DeSanto), Terry (Robin Weekes), the Troll (Martin Julien/Patrick McKenna), Mickey (Daniel Tordjman-Goodfellow), Laura (Andréanne Bénidir), the Prince (Jesse Collins), the Caveman (Martin Julien), Julia (Natasha Greenblatt), and Sally (Asia Vieira).	Written by: Alex Galatis; Directed by: Steve Wright	

== Production ==
Dudley first appeared in The Conserving Kingdom, a 1982 play made by the Ontario Ministry of Energy, and the rights to the character were bought by Ira Levy and Peter Williamson, partners in Toronto's Breakthrough Films and Television Inc, who produced the show with provincial educational broadcaster TVO. Dudley appeared as a six-story tall giant balloon in the Macy's Thanksgiving Day Parade. The creators have explained that the show does not directly compete with Barney, to which it has been compared and seen as more entertaining for adults, as Dudley was intended for what they claim is a slightly older age group of 3 to 7 years old. Jean Morphee-Barnard, an educational consultant on the show, said that, "We don't want to use violence or insults. We want to avoid stereotyping; girls have to be just as involved as the boys are. And usually our villains are misguided rather than evil." The creators of the show have stipulated that merchandising, such as toys and clothing or food products, should be made from natural fibres or should not include any sugar or preservatives. Series writer and co-creator Alex Galatis was inside the costume for the first two seasons, but later only did the voice.

In 2009, Breakthrough announced plans to revive the property as a CGI-animated series with Greene set to return. The project would ultimately not see fruition.

== Broadcast and home media ==
In 2008, Breakthrough closed a deal with APTN to rebroadcast the show. APTN also broadcast the series in French as Les Aventures d’Arthur le Dragon. In the U.S. it currently airing on Heartland and Retro TV as of 2023.

=== VHS releases ===
VHS Tapes released from GoodTimes Entertainment and Malofilm Video.

List of releases	Episodes	Company	Release date
The Dragon Tales	"Dudley Finds His Home" "Mr. Crabby Tree" "High Flyin' Dragon"	Malofilm Video	1994
The Fantastic Tales	"Dudley Meets the Alien" "Dudley and the Gingerbread House"	Malofilm Video	1994
Have Yourself a Crabby Little Christmas	"Have Yourself a Crabby Little Christmas"	Malofilm Video	1994
The Mystery Tales	"Dudley's Tea Party" "Dudley Gets a Tummy Ache"	Malofilm Video	1994
The Travel Tales	"Dudley in the Rainforest" "Dudley and the Great Race"	Malofilm Video	1994
Dudley Finds His Home	"Dudley Finds His Home"	GoodTimes Entertainment	April 27, 1995
Dudley's Tea Party	"Dudley's Tea Party"	GoodTimes Entertainment	April 27, 1995
Mr. Crabby Tree	"Mr. Crabby Tree"	GoodTimes Entertainment	April 27, 1995
Dudley and the Genie	"Dudley and the Genie"	GoodTimes Entertainment	April 27, 1995
Dudley Gets a Tummy Ache	"Dudley Gets a Tummy Ache"	GoodTimes Entertainment	April 27, 1995

== Les Aventures d'Arthur le Dragon ==
During the production of the first two seasons of "Dudley", a French version was also produced and aired on TFO (from September 26, 1993 to March 11, 1994) and Canal Famille (from March 11, 1994 to 1995) in Canada and on TF1 and France 3 in France. For the French version, puppeteers Alex Galatis, James Rankin, and Sue Morrison (as well as Patrick McKenna, who played the Troll) continued to portray their characters, with their voices dubbed by French-speaking actors. These actors included Olivier L'Ècuyer, Christian Laurin, and Mireille Dumont. Asia Vieira, Daniel DeSanto, and Robin Weekes were replaced by French actors. The young actors portraying the kids would watch Vieira, DeSanto, and Weekes perform a scene, and then would do their version of the same scene. In addition, most of the Canadian guest stars on the show were replaced by French celebrities, with the exception of Graham Greene, who continued to portray "Mr. Crabby Tree" (with his voiced dubbed by a French actor). As a result of its cancellation, the version was not distributed to other French-speaking nations.

French Cast

- Alex Galatis as "Arthur le Dragon" ("Dudley", puppetry only)
- Olivier L'Éuyer as "Arthur le Dragon" ("Dudley", voice only), 'Le Lutin" ("The Leprechaun")
- Annick Obonsawin as "Sophie" ("Sally", season 1)
- Andréanne Bendir as "Annick" ("Sally", season 2)
- Anael G. Roy as "Max" ("Matt", season 1)
- Owen Leitch as "Mathieu" ("Matt", season 2)
- Barnabé Geisweiller as "Bastien" ("Terry", season 2)
- James Rankin as "Ti-Louis" ("Sammy", puppetry only), "M. Rouge-Gorge" ("Mr. Robin", puppetry only), "Gran-Pere Rouge Gorge" ("Grandpa Robin", puppetry only), "Ti-Gus" ("Yammi", puppetry only), "Dodo" (puppetry only), "Radar" (puppetry only)
- Christian Laurin as "Ti-Louis" ("Sammy", voice only), "M. Rouge-Gorge" ("Mr. Robin", voice only), "M. Pommier-Grognan" ("Mr. Crabby Tree", voice only), "Gran-Pere Rouge Gorge" ("Grandpa Robin", voice only), "Ti-Gus" ("Yammi", voice only), "Bernardo" (voice only), "Kostus" (voice only), "Maluron" ("Vernon the Toxin", voice only), "Radar" (voice only), "Le Sorcier" ("The Troll", voice only), "Extraterrestre" ("The Alien", voice only)
- Wende Welch as "Mme. Rouge-Gorge" ("Mrs. Robin", puppetry only, first few episodes), "Madame Lepic" ("Didi the Woodpecker", puppetry only, first few episodes), "Iréne" ("Katrina the Whale", puppetry only, first few episodes)
- Sue Morrison as "Mme. Rouge-Gorge" ("Mrs. Robin", puppetry only), "Madame Lepic" ("Didi the Woodpecker", puppetry only), "Iréne" ("Katrina the Whale", puppetry only), "Rosi" ("Rosie the Skunk", puppetry only)
- Mireille Dumont as "Mme. Rouge-Gorge" ("Mrs. Robin", voice only), "Madame Lepic" ("Didi the Woodpecker", voice only), "Iréne" ("Katrina the Whale", voice only), "Rosi" ("Rosie the Skunk", voice only), "Giselle La Poubelle" ("Clarence the Can", voice only)
- Graham Greene as "M. Pommier-Grognan" ("Mr. Crabby Tree", performance only)
- Patrick McKenna as "Le Sorcier" ("The Troll", performance only)
- Marthe Moliki-Sassa as "Rosi" ("Aggie", season 1)
- Lyne Tremblay as "Vivi" ("Aggie", season 2)
- Ed Sahely as "Giselle La Poubelle" ("Clarence the Can", performance only)
- Bernard Gagnon as "Grand et Petit Géant" ("The Tiny Giant")
- Earl Pastko as "Maluron" ("Vernon the Toxin", performance only)
- Louise Shekter as "Visage de la Nature" ("The Face of Nature")
- René Lemieux as "Le Roi" ("The King of All Living Things")
- Daniel Richer as "Pablo Picot" ("Pablo Pickle")
- Angelo Cadet as "Flammo"
- Julian Richings as "Extraterrestre" ("The Alien", performance only)
