= Omen IV: The Awakening =

1991 made-for-television film directed by Dominique Othenin-Girard

- Genre: Horror
- Based on: Characters by David Seltzer
- Screenplay by: Brian Taggert
- Story by: Harvey Bernhard; Brian Taggert
- Directed by: Jorge Montesi; Dominique Othenin-Girard
- Starring: Faye Grant; Michael Woods; Asia Vieira
- Music by: Jonathan Sheffer
- Country of origin: United States
- Original language: English

Production
- Executive producer: Mace Neufeld
- Producers: Harvey Bernhard; Robert J. Anderson
- Production location: Vancouver
- Cinematography: Martin Fuhrer
- Editor: Frank Irvine
- Running time: 97 minutes
- Production companies: FNM Films; Harvey Bernhard Productions; Mace Neufeld Productions
- Budget: $4.5 million

Original release
- Network: Fox
- Release: May 20, 1991

Related
- Omen III: The Final Conflict

Omen IV: The Awakening is a 1991 American supernatural horror television film directed by Jorge Montesi and Dominique Othenin-Girard and written by Brian Taggert, from a story by producer Harvey Bernhard and Taggert. The film is the fourth installment in The Omen franchise and stars Faye Grant, Michael Woods, Michael Lerner, and Asia Vieira. Its plot follows two attorneys who adopt a young girl, unaware of the fact that she is to possibly succeed Damien Thorn as the Antichrist.

The film was intended to be the first of many television sequels to 20th Century Fox's film history of popular titles. Bernhard, who also produced the previous three Omen films, felt there could be more done to the series. This was the last film he produced. He previously wrote the story for the second film.

Omen IV: The Awakening premiered on television in North America on the Fox network, on May 20, 1991. The film was given a theatrical release in some countries, such as Australia, where it premiered on August 9, and in the United Kingdom, where it opened on November 29 of the same year. It was largely panned by critics upon release.

== Plot ==
Virginia congressman Gene York and his attorney wife Karen, after numerous failed attempts to have children, go to a nun-owned orphanage where they adopt a child that they name Delia from a nun named Sister Yvonne.

At first, other than Delia scratching Karen and the later heart attack of the preacher overseeing her baptism, all seems normal. But seven years later, after the Yorks adopt a rottweiler that they name Ryder, Delia starts to display the traits and personality of an increasingly violent and manipulative sociopath. Furthermore, as the family doctor, Dr. Hastings, reveals that she is going through puberty, strange events begin to occur around Delia, including the death of the father of a boy whom she terrorized. Jo Thueson, a New Age practitioner hired by the Yorks as a nanny to help while Gene runs for the Senate, senses something suspicious about Delia after finding her healing crystals blackened by the girl's touch.

At the advice of her friend, an aura reader named Noah, Jo takes Delia to a fair, where all psychics present sense a feeling of unease brought on by the girl's presence. Jo manages to get Noah to take an Aura photograph of Delia before she storms off. But as Noah sees her photograph showing very dark colors, Delia causes a fire that sets the entire fairground ablaze. Though Noah warns her to leave after showing her the photo, Jo attempts to find out why her young charge is so full of negative energy. It is during this investigation that Jo learns of Delia's true identity, but before she can share this information with anyone she is sent plummeting out of a window by Ryder. Karen, who witnesses the fall, faints from shock and is taken to the hospital, where she learns that she is pregnant.

Becoming increasingly alarmed and suspicious of her adoptive daughter, Karen turns to her preacher, Father James Mattson, for help in understanding what Jo learned of Delia, and is told of the Antichrist. Eight months later, after learning that Sister Yvonne mysteriously left the orphanage when she and Gene adopted Delia, Karen hires detective Earl Knight to find Delia's biological parents. Knight's search takes him to Charlotte, North Carolina, where Sister Yvonne now goes by the name Felicity. He finds her taking part in a bizarre snake handling ceremony during which Felicity stands in a circle surrounded by venomous rattlesnakes. Earl shows Felicity a recent photograph of Delia, and unintentionally causes her to be bitten numerous times. After speaking to her before she dies, Knight finds clippings in Felicity's trailer relating to Gene. Unable to return to Virginia, Knight sends Karen a letter of his findings in the mail prior to being killed in a bizarre construction accident. Before his death, he saw with his own eyes what it would look like if the Antichrist won and established the "Kingdom of Perdition".

By this time, with her paranoia worsening, Karen has given birth to her son, Alexander, and is eventually able to leave the hospital and return home to meet the new nanny, Lisa Roselli. Growing increasingly distrustful of Delia around Alexander while learning of Yvonne and Knight's deaths, Karen receives the latter's letter that details Damien Thorn and reveals that Dr. Hastings is a Satanic disciple. Confronting Hastings for answers, Karen learns that Delia is actually Damien's daughter and that she is the protector of the new Antichrist: her twin brother, Alexander, whose embryo was carried inside Delia before being implanted into Karen by Hastings. Karen kills Hastings with a scalpel before returning home armed with his gun, where she kills Roselli, also a Satanic disciple, only to find Delia waiting for her, holding Alexander and drawing Karen's attention to the 666 symbol, clearly displayed on the palm of her brother's hand. Influenced by the baby's power, Karen ends up taking her own life. Afterwards, Gene, Delia, and Alexander attend her funeral.

== Cast ==
- Faye Grant as Karen York
- Michael Woods as Gene York
- Asia Vieira as Delia York
  - Brianne Harrett as Delia York (3 years old)
  - Rebecca Cynader as Delia York (2 years old)
  - Shelby Adams as Delia York (baby)
- Michael Lerner as Earl Knight
- Madison Mason as Dr. Lou Hastings
- Ann Hearn as Jo Thueson
- Jim Byrnes as Noah
- Don S. Davis as Jake Madison
- Megan Leitch as Sister Yvonne / Felicity
- Joy Coghill as Sister Francesca
- Cydney McPherson as Alexander York
- David Cameron as Father Hayes
- Duncan Fraser as Father Mattson
- Susan Chapple as Mother Superior
- Dana Still as Revival Preacher
- Andrea Mann as Miss Lisa Roselli
- Camille Mitchell as Madge Milligan
- Brenda Crichlow as Hildy Riggs
- William S. Taylor as Forrest Riggs
- Serge Houde as Morris Creighton
- Wendy Van Riesen as Lily Creighton
- James Sherry as Jerome
- Mikal Dughi as Miss Elsa Norris

== Production ==
Producer Harvey Bernhard, who'd produced the prior three films in The Omen series, stated that he'd wanted to prove in an era of ever increasing production budgets he would still be able to make a $4.5 million look as if it was made for $16 million. Despite the film being positioned as a TV film for Fox, Bernhard thought there was a good chance it could be held for a theatrical release. Dominique Othenin-Girard was initially hired to direct the film, but after two weeks of filming Othenin-Girard left the film with producer Harvey Bernhard citing "creative differences" and Jorge Montesi was hired to replace him.

=== Filming ===
Omen IV: The Awakening was filmed on location in Vancouver, British Columbia. Production was delayed when three of worst blizzards in history hit the city in rapid succession. As with other films in the series, the shoot was plagued by accidents and mishaps such as a stuntman crushing his knee against the dumpster’s rim missing his mark during a 15 foot fall and climactic Psychic Fair fire effect went wrong that caused the entire set to be engulfed in flames causing a sizable mushroom cloud which towered over Vancouver.

According to Harvey Bernhard the snake pit sequence frightened the entire crew: "We used 24 venomous rattlesnakes—not defanged—and two absolutely mad snake wranglers who told me they'd agreed to be bitten for $5,000 a hit. They weren't kidding! They had the antidote nearby." Bernhard said that the biting scenes in the film were real; "one of the snakes is actually biting one of the wranglers' arms."

=== Music ===
The score was mostly composed by Jonathan Sheffer, while passages from Jerry Goldsmith's original score recordings from The Omen and The Final Conflict were also sampled and used in climactic moments.

== Release ==
Fox chose to release the film on television due to recent poor box office performances of "devil films" such as The Guardian and The Exorcist III. The film had its first North American television airing on the Fox network, on May 20, 1991. According to the Nielsen ratings, 6.4 million homes tuned into the premiere, which amounted to 9.4 million viewers overall. The film received a theatrical release in some countries, such as Australia, where it opened on August 9, 1991. In the United Kingdom, the film debuted theatrically at the 14th Tyneside International Film Festival on October 12, 1991. It was subsequently given a general theatrical release in the United Kingdom beginning November 29, 1991.

== Reception ==
The movie received an overwhelmingly negative reception from critics. On the review aggregator website Rotten Tomatoes, the film has an approval rating of 17% based on 6 reviews, with an average rating of 2.6/10.

The Los Angeles Times' Chris Willman panned the film, writing: "The direction, credited to Jorge Montesi and Dominique Othenin-Girard--with "action sequences" by producer Harvey Bernhard—is as witless, visually dull and slow-moving as Brian Taggert's sub-pedestrian script would demand." Ken Tucker of Entertainment Weekly awarded the film a D+ rating, deeming it "just plain ridiculous... The most interesting detail about Omen IV is that its real heroes — the people who try to help the parents to control their daughter — are a gaggle of New Age psychics who wear "healing crystals" around their necks and say things like "Oh, there's nothing strange about metaphysics and New Thought; it's very positive.""

Lee Bacchus of The Province likened the film to "more camp than [a] classic horror tale," noting that the film "never takes itself too seriously." The Sydney Morning Herald noted that the film "obliterates any lingering traces of glamour left by its three successful prequels. It's hard to believe that anyone could reduce the usually reliable entertainment factors of demons among us and world apocalypse to snooze level but this does it." The Guardian's Derek Malcolm likened the film to a "cheapjack semi-remake of the original."

=== Home media ===
The film was released for the first time on LaserDisc in 1992 and 1993 with three versions: Japan PILF-1437 1992, U.S.A 1919-80 1992, and in Hong Kong 1919FF827L 1993. It was also released on DVD on September 4, 2001 through 20th Century Fox Home Entertainment as part of a four-film DVD collection featuring the previous two sequels and the 1976 original film. The film had its first Blu-ray release through Scream Factory on October 15, 2019 as part of a "Deluxe Edition" box set featuring the original film, its three sequels, and the 2006 remake.
