= Katts and Dog =

- Also known as: Rin Tin Tin: K-9 Cop (U.S.)
- Starring: Jesse Collins; Andrew Bednarski; Rudolph Von Holstein III; Nancy Anne Sakovich
- Composer: Paul Zaza
- Country of origin: Canada
- Original language: English
- No. of seasons: 5
- No. of episodes: 106

Production
- Executive producer: Herbert B. Leonard
- Running time: 30 minutes
- Production companies: Dover Beach Productions; Comweb Productions

Original release
- Network: CTV; CBN Cable/The Family Channel; La Cinq
- Release: September 17, 1988 – 1993

Katts and Dog is a French and Canadian-produced television series that ran from 1988 to 1993. It was known as Rin Tin Tin: K-9 Cop in the United States where it originally aired on CBN Cable/The Family Channel and Rintintin Junior in France on La Cinq. CTV broadcast the series in Canada.

When the episodes were filmed (and shown in Canada) the dog’s name was "Rudy". When the series was aired in the US and France, the name was dubbed as "Rinty" to go with the new title. However, some episodes of Katts and Dog have the American dubbing where "Rudy" is called "Rinty" throughout the episode. The episode "Hit and Run" is an example of this. Herbert B. Leonard, who owned the rights to the Rin Tin Tin trademark, was an executive producer on the show; he was not directly active in production and left before the series concluded in a dispute with Pat Robertson, who as owner of CBN had provided much of the show's funding.

When the series went out in Britain, it kept the title Katts and Dog, but the dog's name was changed to "Rinty".

== Synopsis ==
The series follows a police officer and his German Shepherd partner, a K-9 unit that works together to stop crime.

The show is about the life of a special breed of cop - Canine Officer Hank Katts; a strong, self-made survivor from immigrant stock who has fought his way up from a tough steel mill town - and his canine partner who fight crime and the forces of evil. Katts's courage and street smarts make him a good police officer, but his rebellious, questioning side makes him a difficult partner to work with. That is why he's assigned to the K-9 Corps, the police dog unit.

The show’s early episodes begin with Hank just finishing up Police Academy. Later on, it shows the first meeting between Katts and Rudy/Rinty when he rescues the apparently vicious animal from an abusive owner. When the dog's breed papers reveal it to be a great-great-grandson of the legendary film star dog Rin-Tin-Tin, it is assigned to the force with Hank as its handler and given a name reflecting its famous ancestor ... Rinnie.

With the latest in hi-tech crime-fighting equipment, the pair create a powerful team. Rinnie's instincts, loyalty and courage help Hank catch burglars, raid drug dens, defuse time bombs, find lost children and protect the weak from muggers.

It also shows the life of Hank’s nephew, Steve, through the death of his mother and his adoption by Officer Katts.

A 1991 TV movie had Officer Katts and Rudy visit Paris, titled Rin Tin Tin and the Paris Conspiracy, in the US.

== Cast ==
- Jesse Collins as Officer Hank Katts
- Andrew Bednarski as Steve Katts
- Rudolph Von Holstein III as Rudy/Rinty
- Denise Virieux as Officer Renee Daumier
- Nancy Anne Sakovich as Officer Leah McCray
- Peter MacNeill as Sergeant Callahan
- Dan Martin as Officer Lou Adams
- Phil Jarrett as Sergeant O.C. Phillips
- Denis Akiyama as Officer Ron Nakamura
- Brian Kaulback as Officer Dennis Brian
- Cali Timmins as Maggie Davenport
- Corrine Koslo as Officer Connie Booth
- Ken Pogue as Captain Cullen Murdoch
- Michael Quinsey as Max Kane/Dog Trainer
- Chuck Shamata as Lieutenant Logan

== Episodes ==
=== Season 1 (1988–89) ===
No. overall	No. in season	Title	Directed by	Written by	Original release date
1	1	"Boy Meets Dog"	Clay Borris	Chris Canaan & Michael Zettler & Shelly Altman	September 16, 1988
2	2	"A Catered Affair"	Clay Boris	Michael Zettler & Shelly Altman	1988
3	3	"Dogged Pursuit"	Patrick Corbett	Michael Zettler & Shelly Altman	1988
4	4	"Best Friends"	Patrick Corbett	Michael Zettler & Shelly Altman	1988
5	5	"Code of Honor"	Patrick Corbett	Michael Zettler & Shelly Altman	1988
6	6	"The Striptease Bank Robber"	Clay Borris	Avrum Jacobson	1988
7	7	"Hostages"	Clay Borris	Michael Zettler & Shelly Altman	1988
8	8	"Birds of a Feather"	Gilbert M. Shilton	Philip Rosenberg	1988
9	9	"Race Against Time"	Donald Shebib	Marlene Matthews	1988
10	10	"Diamonds"	Clay Boris	R.B. Carney	1988
11	11	"Kids Just Want to Have Fun"	Patrick Corbett	Angelo Stea & Peter Lauterman	1988
12	12	"Hear No Evil, Speak No Evil"	Don Shebib	Avrum Jacobson	1988
13	13	"Princess Rosa"	Clay Borris	Angelo Stea & Peter Lauterman	1988
14	14	"Comedy of Errors"	Clay Borris	Tony Di Franco	1988
15	15	"Protective Custody"	Clay Borris	Michael Zettler & Shelly Altman	1988
16	16	"The Candidate"	Gilbert Shilton	Peter Swet	1989
17	17	"The Hit"	Gilbert Shilton	Michael Zettler & Shelly Altman	1989
18	18	"Chateau"	Clay Borris	Marlene Matthews	1989
19	19	"The Orchid and the Lady"	Clay Borris	Lorne Rossman	1989
20	20	"Scotty's Law"	Clay Borris	Laurie Pearson	1989
21	21	"What If I'm Not a Cop?"	Clay Borris	Michael Zettler & Shelly Altman	1989
22	22	"Murder She Sang"	Roman Buchok	Angelo Stea & Peter Lauterman	1989

=== Season 2 (1989–90) ===
No. overall	No. in season	Title	Directed by	Written by	Original release date
23	1	"Freeze"	Clay Borris	Chris Canaan	1989
24	2	"Hot Under the Collar"	Clay Borris	Michael Zettler & Shelly Altman	1989
25	3	"A Family Affair"	Al Waxman	Laurie Pearson	1989
26	4	"12 Cops and a Baby"	Clay Borris	Michael Zettler & Shelly Altman	1989
27	5	"Decoy"	Clay Borris	Michael Zettler & Shelly Altman	1989
28	6	"The Gun"	Al Waxman	Michael Zettler & Shelly Altman	1989
29	7	"Lost and Found"	Al Waxman	Avrum Jacobson	1989
30	8	"Double Exposure"	Clay Borris	Michael Zettler & Shelly Altman	1989
31	9	"A Killer Among Us"	Roman Buchok	Angelo Stea & Peter Lauterman	1990
32	10	"Officer Down"	Clay Borris	Story by : Lionel E. Siegel; Teleplay by : Marlene Matthews	1990
33	11	"Jail Bait"	Peter Rowe	P. Barry	1990
34	12	"Mistaken Identity"	Clay Borris	Avrum Jacobson	1990
35	13	"Don't Drink the Water"	Dennis Berry	P. Barry	1990
36	14	"The Chameleon"	Clay Borris	Angelo Stea & Peter Lauterman	1990
37	15	"Day of Jeopardy"	Dennis Berry	Angelo Stea & Peter Lauterman	1990
38	16	"A Ride Into Danger"	Jean-Pierre Prevost	P. Barry	1990
39	17	"Diplomatic Immunity"	Dennis Berry	Story by : Elizabeth Baxter; Teleplay by : Angelo Stea & Peter Lauterman	1990
40	18	"The Grand Hotel Caper"	Jean-Pierre Prevost	Avrum Jacobson	1990
41	19	"Scent of Evil"	Dennis Berry	Story by : Claude-Michel Rome; Teleplay by : Angelo Stea & Peter Lauterman	1990
42	20	"Lost Dog"	Paolo Barzman	Story by : Olivier Mergault; Teleplay by : Laurie Pearson	1990
43	21	"Desperate Sunday"	Roman Buchok	Avrum Jacobson	1990
44	22	"Fatal Obsession"	Clay Borris	Laurie Pearson	1990

=== Season 3 (1990–91) ===
No. overall	No. in season	Title	Directed by	Written by	Original release date
45	1	"Father and Son"	Peter Rowe	TBD	1990
46	2	"Love Me, Love My Dog"	Don McCutcheon	TBD	1990
47	3	"Friendly Persuasion"	Peter Rowe	Lionel E. Siegel	1990
48	4	"Skyscraper"	Alan Simmonds	Avrum Jacobson	1990
49	5	"Kidnapped"	Clay Borris	Story by : Alison Reid; Teleplay by : Marlene Matthews	1990
50	6	"Count Your Blessings"	Don McCutcheon	Martin Lager	1990
51	7	"It's a Dog's Life"	Alan Simmonds	Avrum Jacobson	1990
52	8	"A Day in the Country"	Don McCutcheon	Tony DiFanco	1990
53	9	"And the Winner is..."	Clay Borris	Charles Lazer	1990
54	10	"Playing with Fire"	Roman Buchok	Laurie Pearson	1990
55	11	"On the Take"	Jesse Collins	TBD	1991
56	12	"Endangered Species"	Rob Malenfant	Martin Lager	1991
57	13	"Hard Choice"	Rob Malenfant	P.B. Gordon & Tony DiBarco	1991
58	14	"Smokescreen"	Roman Buchok	Laurie Pearson	1991
59	15	"Heartburn"	Don McCutcheon	Angelo Stea & Peter Lauterman	1991
60	16	"Number One with a Bullet"	TBD	TBD	1991
61	17	"The Fugitive"	Don McCutcheon	P.B. Gordon & Tony DiBarco	1991
62	18	"Spring Fever"	Alan Simmonds	Laurie Pearson	1991
63	19	"Over the Hill Gang"	Don McCutcheon	Angelo Stea & Peter Lauterman	1991
64	20	"Double Cross"	Peter Rowe	Martin Lager	1991
65	21	"36 Hours to Kill"	TBD	TBD	1991
66	22	"Cops and Robbers"	TBD	TBD	1991

=== Season 4 (1991) ===
No. overall	No. in season	Title	Directed by	Written by	Original release date
67	1	"By the Book"	Jesse Collins	Roy Sallows	1991
68	2	"Desperate Hours"	Clay Borris	Martin Lager	1991
69	3	"Lethal Injection"	Clay Borris	Tony DiFranco & Marlene Matthews	1991
70	4	"Fink"	Jesse Collins	Avrum Jacobson	1991
71	5	"Penny from Heaven"	Don McCutcheon	Marlene Matthews	1991
72	6	"Counterfeit Love"	TBD	TBD	1991
73	7	"Just Say No"	Roman Buchok	Phil Bedard & Larry Lalonde	1991
74	8	"Blind Spot"	Don Shebib	Story by : Bryan Renfro; Teleplay by : Alison Reid	1991
75	9	"Gun Shy"	Roman Buchok	Eric Weinthal	1991
76	10	"Light at the End of the Tunnel"	Don Shebib	Eric Weinthal	1991
77	11	"What the Doctor Ordered"	Don McCutcheon	Charles Lazer	1991
78	12	"Relatively Speaking"	Don McCutcheon	Roy Sallows & Avrum Jacobson	1991
79	13	"Operation: Ship of Fools"	Clay Borris	Jeremy Gauthier	1991
80	14	"Abused Child"	Clay Borris	P. Barry	1991
81	15	"Club Dead"	Stacey Stewart Curtis	P. Barry	1991
82	16	"Big Man on Campus"	Roman Buchok	Laurie Pearson	1991
83	17	"Loose Cannon"	Don McCutcheon	Roy Sallows & Avrum Jacobson	1991
84	18	"All That Glitters"	Alain Nahum	Story by : Mark Eisenchteter; Teleplay by : Angelo Stea & Peter Lauterman	1991
85	19	"One Brown Shoe"	Alain Nahum	Story by : Philippe Bérenger; Teleplay by : Angelo Stea & Peter Lauterman	1991
86	20	"Switch"	Dennis Berry	Story by : Elizabeth Baxter; Teleplay by : Angelo Stea & Peter Lauterman	1991
87	21	"Blind Faith"	TBD	TBD	1991
88	22	"The Big Gun"	TBD	TBD	1991

=== Season 5 (1992–93) ===
No. overall	No. in season	Title	Directed by	Written by	Original release date
89	1	"Boy Who Cried Wolf"	Don McCutcheon	Avrum Jacobson	1992
90	2	"Hit and Run"	Jesse Collins	Laurie Pearson	1992
91	3	"Attacked"	Don McCutcheon	P. Barry	1992
92	4	"Bang, Bang, You're Dead"	Clay Borris	Eric Weinthal	1992
93	5	"Falling Out Among Thieves"	Clay Borris	Avrum Jacobson	1992
94	6	"Under Siege"	Jesse Collins	Roy Sallows	1992
95	7	"A Friendly Revenge"	TBD	TBD	1992
96	8	"Christmas Spirit"	TBD	TBD	1992
97	9	"Trapped"	TBD	TBD	1992
98	10	"Dead on Arrival"	TBD	TBD	1992
99	11	"Crime of Fashion"	TBD	TBD	1992
100	12	"Reasonable Force"	TBD	TBD	1992
101	13	"Killing Ground"	TBD	TBD	1992
102	14	"Heartstrings"	TBD	TBD	1992
103	15	"Decoy Ducks"	Don McCutcheon	P. Barry	1992
104	16	"Bounty Hunter"	Jesse Collins	Avrum Jacobson	1992
105	17	"Wrong Place, Wrong Time"	Jesse Collins	Laurie Pearson	1992
106	18	"Stage Mother"	Don McCutcheon	Avrum Jacobson	1993
