= The Good Mother (1988 film) =

1988 film by Leonard Nimoy

- Theatrical release poster
- Directed by: Leonard Nimoy
- Screenplay by: Michael Bortman
- Based on: The Good Mother by Sue Miller
- Produced by: Arne Glimcher
- Starring: Diane Keaton; Liam Neeson; Jason Robards; Ralph Bellamy
- Cinematography: David Watkin
- Edited by: Peter E. Berger
- Music by: Elmer Bernstein
- Production companies: Touchstone Pictures; Silver Screen Partners IV
- Distributed by: Buena Vista Pictures Distribution
- Release date: November 4, 1988
- Running time: 104 minutes
- Country: United States
- Language: English
- Budget: $14 million
- Box office: $4,764,606

The Good Mother is a 1988 American drama film and an adaptation of Sue Miller's novel of the same name. Directed by Leonard Nimoy, the film stars Diane Keaton and Liam Neeson in the leading roles. The Good Mother explores feelings and beliefs about children's exposure to adult sexuality and challenges society's growing reliance upon courts to settle complex private and ethical matters.

== Plot ==
Anna Dunlap (Keaton), is a Boston piano teacher, working part-time at a college laboratory who recently divorced her husband Brian (James Naughton) and has custody of her six-year-old daughter Molly (Asia Viera). Soon, Anna meets and falls in love with Leo (Neeson), a sexually liberated Irish sculptor who changes her perspective on life. One day, Molly sees Leo naked in the bathroom, and she asks if she can touch him, which he allows. After Molly talks to Brian about her experience with Leo, Brian accuses Leo of sexually molesting Molly and sues Anna for custody of their daughter. Leo explains he thought it was in keeping with Anna's parenting, since she had bathed with Molly and was very open with her. A counselor agrees that Leo should have known better but he believes that Molly hasn't been abused and is a very well adjusted and happy child, particularly with Anna and Leo. However, Brian wins custody of Molly, and Anna and Leo end their relationship.

== Cast List ==
- Diane Keaton as Anna Dunlop
- Liam Neeson as Leo Cutter
- Jason Robards as W. O. Muth
- Ralph Bellamy as Frank, Anna's maternal grandfather
- Teresa Wright as Eleanor, Anna's maternal grandmother
- James Naughton as Brian Dunlop
- Asia Vieira as Molly Dunlop
- Joe Morton as Frank Williams
- Fred Melamed as Dr. Payne
- Katey Sagal as Ursula
- Margaret Bard as Aunt Rain
- Nancy Beatty as Anna's Mother
- Barry Belchamber as Anna's Father
- Mairon Bennett as Young Anna Dunlop
- Zachary Bennett as Young Bobby
- Scott Brunt as Eric
- Marvin Karon as Older Bobby
- Charles Kimbrough as Uncle Orrie
- Tracy Griffith as Babe
- Matt Damon as Extra (uncredited)
- Ben Affleck as Extra (uncredited)

== Reception ==
The film received mixed reviews. On Rotten Tomatoes the film has an approval rating of 54% based on reviews from 13 critics.
