= Jesse Collins =

Canadian actor and director

- Born: December 9, 1961 (age 64); Toronto, Ontario, Canada
- Occupations: Actor, director
- Years active: 1982–2012

Jesse Collins (born December 9, 1961) is a Canadian actor and director. He is best known for starring in the television series Katts and Dog. He was nominated for a Daytime Emmy Award in 2000 for his direction of the PBS series Zoboomafoo. He voiced Sandy Beach in the TV series Rescue Heroes. His other credits include Cyberchase, Storm Hawks, World of Quest, Babar and the Adventures of Badou, The Berenstain Bears, Arthur, Noddy, George Shrinks, and Slugterra.

== Filmography ==
=== Film ===
Year	Title	Role	Notes
1988	Iron Eagle II	Bush	
1994	The Santa Clause	Ad Executive	
1995	Darkman II: The Return of Durant	Dr. David Brinkman	

=== Television ===
Year	Title	Role	Notes
1983	The Littlest Hobo	Lennox Jr.	2 episodes
1985	The Park Is Mine	Squad 2 Officer	Television film
1986	The Edison Twins	Nick	Episode: "The Initiation"
1987	Alfred Hitchcock Presents	Rick Muldoon	Episode: "The Initiation"
1988–1993	Katts and Dog	Hank Katts	106 episodes
1990	The Ray Bradbury Theater	Jonathan Hughes	Episode: "Touch of Petulance"
1992	Secret Service	Dwyer	Episode: "FALN/A Rogue by Any Other Name"
1993	Street Legal	Todd Conway	Episode: "Truth, Lies and Consequences"
1994	The Babymaker: The Dr. Cecil Jacobson Story	Peter Fowler	Television film
1995	Kung Fu: The Legend Continues	Rick Parker	Episode: "Chinatown Murder Mystery: The Case of the Poisoned Hand"
1995	Ultraforce	Additional voices	Episode: "Prime Time"
1995	Forever Knight	Hans Victor	Episode: "Let No Man Tear Asunder"
1995–1997	The Adventures of Dudley the Dragon	Prince	5 episodes
1996	Psi Factor	Paul Tanner	Episode: "Possession/Man Out of Time"
1996–1997	Wind at My Back	Joe Callaghan	5 episodes
1996–1997	Ready or Not	Mr. Sark	3 episodes
1997–1998	Diabolik	Daggett	5 episodes
1998	Edison: The Wizard of Light	Jack Maloney	Television film
1998	At the End of the Day: The Sue Rodriguez Story	Chris Considine	Television film
1998, 2000	Mythic Warriors: Guardians of the Legend	Apollo	2 episodes
1999	Family of Cops III: Under Suspicion	Deputy Mayor Albright	Television film
1999–2000	Blaster's Universe	Additional voices	13 episodes
2001	Rescue Heroes	Sandy Beach	Episode: "Trapped Beneath the Sea/Houston, We Have a Problem"
