= Kirk Dunn =

Canadian actor, playwright, and fibre artist

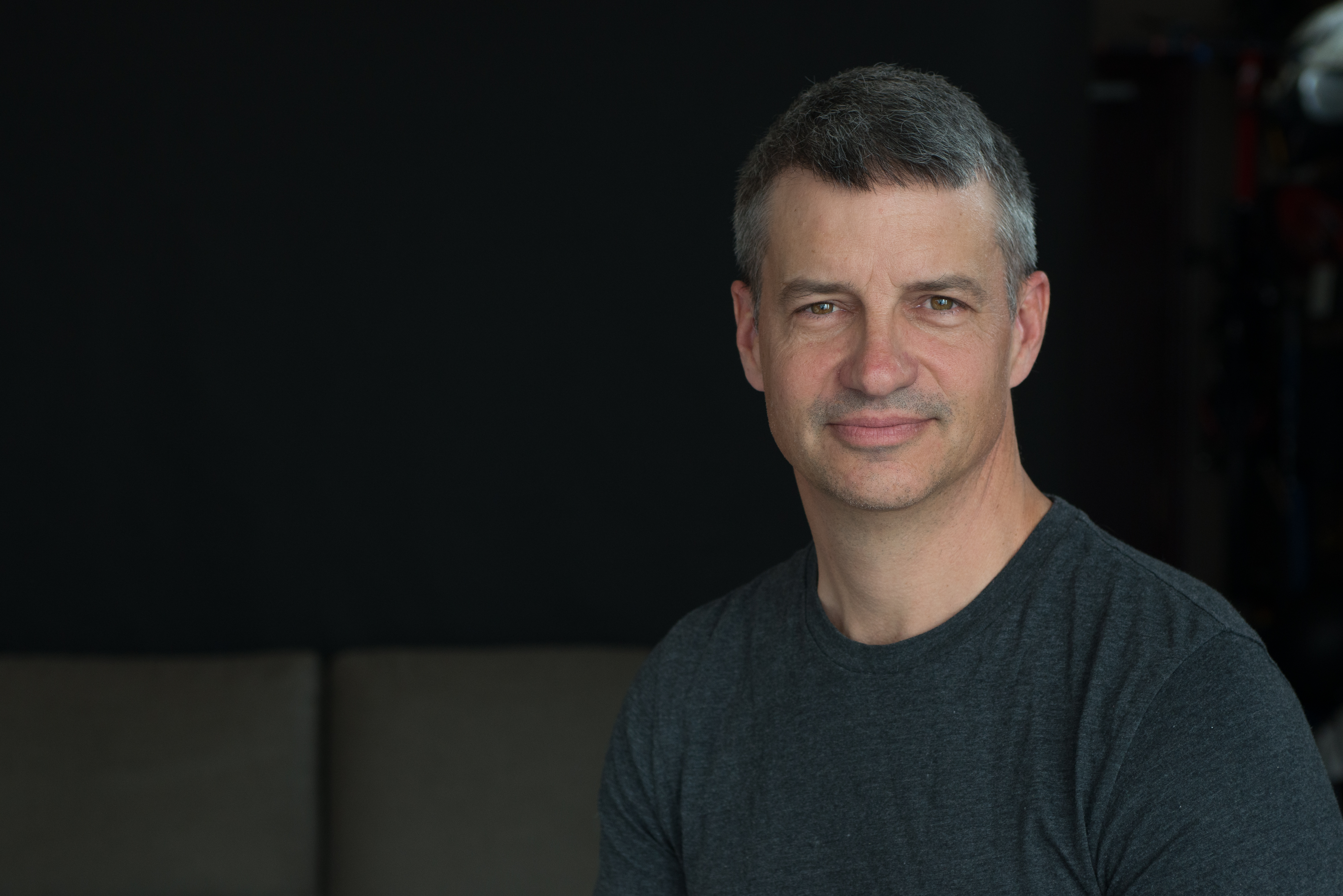
- Born: February 4, 1964; Kingston, Ontario, Canada
- Occupations: Actor; Playwright; Fibre Artist
- Years active: 1988 – present
- Spouse: Claire Ross Dunn
- Children: 2

Kirk Andrew Dunn (February 4, 1964) is a Canadian actor, writer, and fibre artist best known for his use of texture and colour in knitting. His works include a giant triptych installation, "Stitched Glass," and a one-man show he co-wrote and tours about that work, The Knitting Pilgrim.

== Early life ==
Kirk Dunn was born on February 4, 1964, in Kingston, Ontario. His father, the Reverend Zander Dunn, presided at St. Paul's Presbyterian Church on Amherst Island. His family relocated to Guyana for three years before settling in North Bay, Ontario. Dunn moved to Toronto to attend York University, where he studied performance between 1983 and 1987, graduating with a Bachelor of Fine Arts Honours in Theatre Performance.

== Career ==
=== Acting ===
Dunn trained in theatre performance at York University and after graduation branched out into film and television. He obtained the lead role in the short film, Like A Dream: The Mario Lanza Story (1989), written and directed by John Martins-Manteiga, which screened at the Cannes Film Festival International Critics' Week Short Film Competition in 1990.

Other film appearances include 20th Century Fox's comedy, Trapped in Paradise (1994), and Day Pass (1997).

In the mid-1990s, Dunn landed a role on TVO/PBS's The Adventures of Dudley the Dragon, a Canadian children's television series. Dunn played Dudley, concealed in an eight-foot-tall green dragon puppet suit for seasons three through to five (1995 – 1997).

Dunn continued to act for the theatre with stage credits including Dads! The Musical (Charlottetown Festival, 1994/95);Romeo and Juliet (Ford Centre, Shakespeare in Action, 1996); The Affections of May (1994), Dads! The Musical(1995),The War Show (1996), A Flea in Her Ear (1997), and Don't Dress for Dinner (1999) for Drayton Entertainment; and Merlin and The Complete Works of William Shakespeare (Abridged) for Toronto's Young People's Theatre(2001/02).

In 2000, Dunn was cast in the title role of Billy Bishop Goes to War, a monodrama about the Canadian WWI fighter pilot, produced by The Gypsy Theatre in Fort Erie, Ontario. Accompanied by pianist Don Simpson, Dunn played the show in rep to acclaim, and he reprised the role for a province-wide tour of Ontario in 2002 with Ergo Arts Theatre (Toronto, Ontario), which they remounted again in 2005 with Dunn in the lead.

In 2019, Dunn started performing and touring his multidisciplinary solo show, The Knitting Pilgrim.

=== Writing ===
In the mid to late 1990s, Dunn mainly wrote children's content. For television, he penned multiple episodes of The Adventures of Dudley the Dragon (YTV, TVO and PBS), Ants in Your Pants (Treehouse), Fuzzpaws (Treehouse), and Hello Mrs. Cherrywinkle (OWL TV for PBS).

For the theatre, Dunn has written the book and lyrics for three TYA (Theatre for Young Audiences) musicals: Pete's Feat, The Lost Land, and Derek the Viking. These plays have been produced across North America, and the latter two won Storybook Theatre's playwriting competition in Calgary, Alberta.

A member of the Playwrights Guild of Canada, Dunn has co-authored, with his wife Claire Ross Dunn, The Knitting Pilgrim, a "one-man play and talkback about the artistic and spiritual fifteen-year journey of knitting a triptych of stained glass [sic] windows." The piece premiered in Toronto, produced by Ergo Arts Theatre, and it toured provincially throughout 2019 and 2020, up until COVID-19 halted all performances. The play has since begun touring again, and has been seen in Ontario, across the Maritimes, in Austria, and in Germany.

=== Fibre arts ===
Depending on the source, Dunn originally took up the art of knitting to woo a girlfriend (the craft outlasting the relationship), or to pass the time in the van while working as an actor on tour. Knitting since 1988, Dunn began designing in 1996, garments at first, before transitioning to installations as a means to explore "how to use knitting in unexpected ways." He apprenticed with the renowned American-born, British-based decorative artist, "knitting guru," Kaffe Fassett in London, England in 1998. He is additionally influenced by British designer, Brandon Mably, manager of the Kaffe Fassett Studio, as well as by the Impressionists, and M.C. Escher, as demonstrated by Dunn's use of colour and 3-D geometric patterns.

Participating in acts of craftivism, Dunn adopts the "ancient technique" of knitting, so "deceptively simple, primarily using a binary stitch" to produce works of "great resonance, complexity, beauty, and meaning." Dunn believes that knitting is an art form that is "tangible and accessible enough so that it can speak to many," all the while producing "startling, meaningful, awe-inspiring and beautiful works, and not just hats and scarves."

=== Installations ===
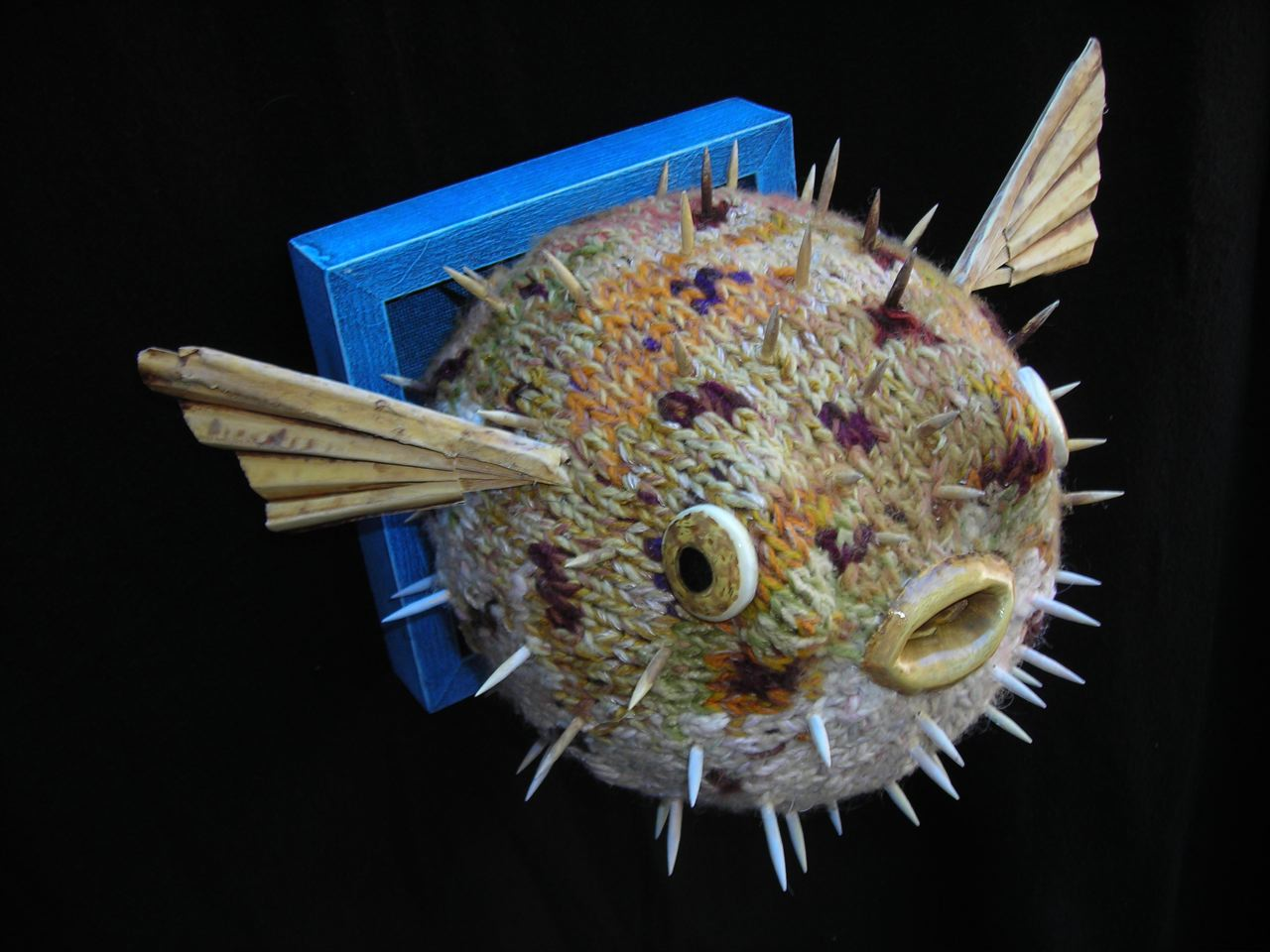
"Not for Dinner" Puffer Fish by Kirk Dunn

Dunn's work often re-imagines knitting "as complex and colourful three-dimensional unexpected things from the natural world." This is evident with his series of marine life creatures, which include "Lionfish (Invasive Species)"; "Not for Dinner "[a puffer fish]; "North Pacific Gyre Jellyfish"; "Painted Turtle, Extinct"; "Folk Arts Crabs"; and "Escher's Salamander." Some of these creations were made for the Textile Museum of Canada's annual Shadow Box Silent Auction, as with Painted Turtle and Lionfish. These works are intended to "take people by surprise, so they see what knitting is capable of – and so they see the many colours and wondrous shapes of our natural world, and feel connected to it, a part of a greater whole."

Dunn's fibre art practice is characterized by three unique knitting techniques. The first he calls "improvisation on the needle," as he does not pre-plan his colour choices and combinations, but rather chooses them on the go, as he knits, often using three to five strands of yarn at once. Second, Dunn creates an "Impressionistic pointillism effect" by twisting multiple yarns as he knits, simulating small dots of paint. Third, also in emulation of the Impressionists, Dunn pairs complementary colours (such as adding orange to blues) to make colour choices that are rich and have depth. This technique produces a luminous kind of effect that appears as if light is shining on and through the knitting.

Dunn has been featured in Enroute, Family Circle Knitting, Maclean's Magazine, Vogue Knitting International, and Vogue's Knit.1.

Dunn has guest lectured and led workshops at The Aga Khan Museum, The Textile Museum of Canada, The Mississippi Valley Textile Museum, and the Fashion Arts Creative Textiles Studio.

=== Activism ===
Dunn turned his skills to activist work in 2017 when Donald Trump was elected President of the United States. Many Canadians donned pussyhats and joined the Women's March on Washington D.C. to protest comments made by Trump. Dunn took part in the Pussyhat Project, knitting "pussyhats" for friends, including Erin Smith, AD of Soulo Theatre, and Savoy Howe, founder of the Toronto Newsgirls Boxing Club, both of whom led a Toronto contingent to Washington, DC for the protests.

In 2019, Dunn created a crocheted rainbow yarn bomb or "tree sweater." The piece was originally installed on the family's front lawn in east Toronto in support of Pride month and gender rights. By the following year, the project had been named the "Travelling Community Support Rainbow Yarn Bomb." The piece travels to different locations across Ontario, expressing solidarity with LGBTQIA+ communities, and raising money for the Rainbow Railroad.

=== Stitched Glass ===
Dunn created "Stitched Glass", a work instigated by Nataley Nagy, past Executive Director of the Textile Museum of Canada (current Executive Director of the Kelowna Art Gallery), who encouraged Dunn to pursue "exhibition art" with his knitting. As a result, Dunn developed the concept for three 5' x 9' "tapestries," or knitted panels, designed in the style of religious stained-glass windows. It was shortly after 9/11, and Dunn had been struggling with the contentious relationship between the Abrahamic Faiths – Judaism, Christianity, and Islam – so, he decided to "explore the commonalities and the conflicts of the three faiths by pulling the medieval art form of stained glass into the present, and combining it with the accessible craft of knitting – and by employing these two art forms – that ironically don't use words – to provoke a conversation of nuance and colour about how the faiths are relating to one another."

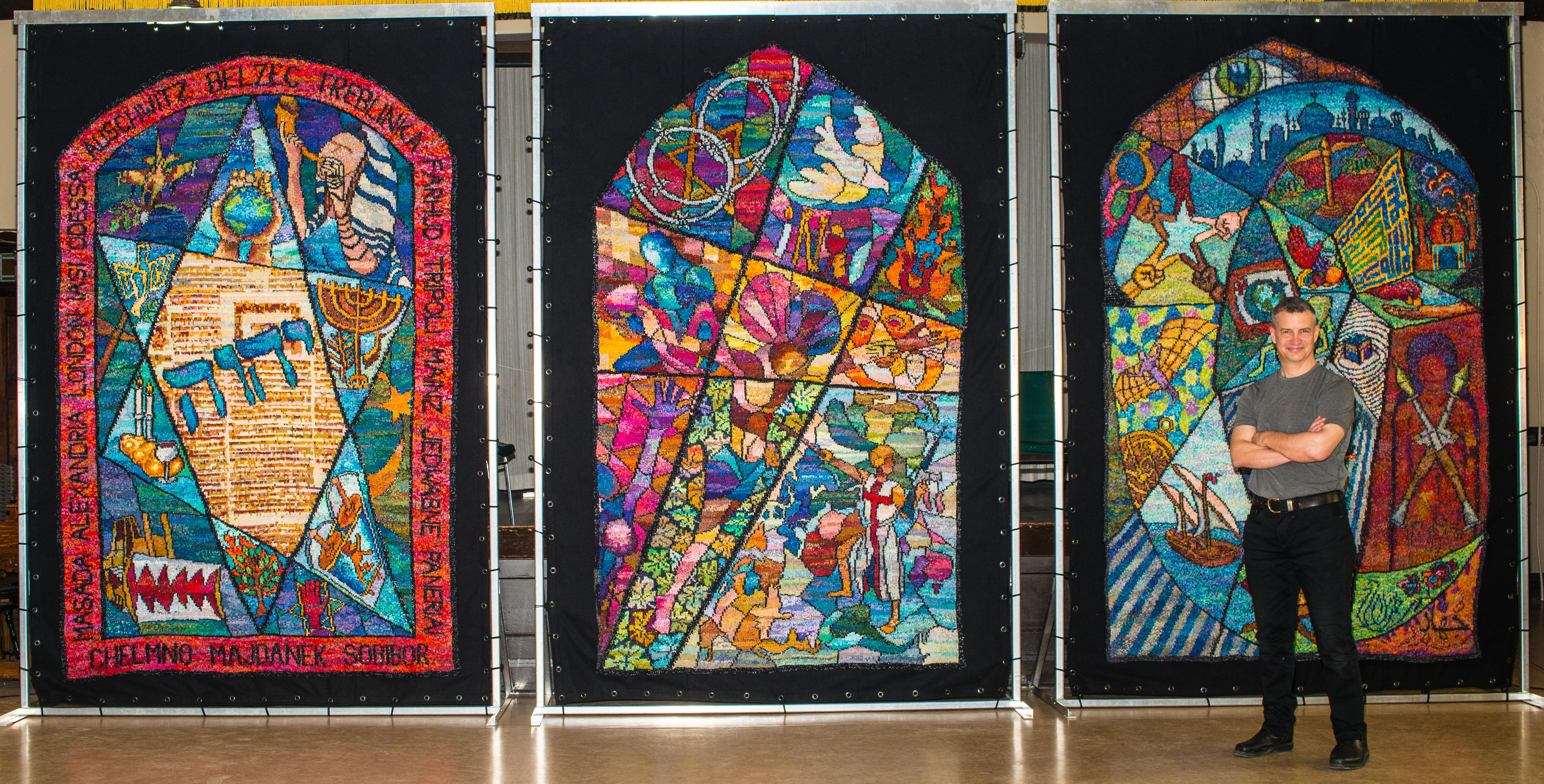
Kirk Dunn in front of his three knitted tapestries.

Dunn was awarded an Ontario Arts Council Chalmers Foundation Fellowship to support the work on "Stitched Glass" in 2003, and he began working on the project in 2004. Although he estimated in his grant application that the whole project from beginning to end would take approximately ten months, it took him fifteen years to complete.

The Toronto Star's Tara Deschamps describes the piece as "composed of about 100 pounds of knitting and $10,000 of yarn," which is "sprinkled with religious symbols including the Star of David, the Kaaba, the burning bush, a dove and a menorah."

Dunn's "Stitched Glass" creation caught the attention of filmmakers Ian Daffern and Omar Majeed, who created a documentary about the project, entitled Stitched Glass – The Documentary. Produced by Idfactory, the film premiered at the 39th edition of The International Festival of Films on Art (Le FIFA) in Montreal, March 16–28, 2021, and was nominated for Best Documentary Arts/Culture at the 2021 Yorkton Film Festival, and for Best Short Documentary at the 2021 Short Encounters International Film Festival. It also screened at the Forest City Film Festival in London, Ontario in October 2021 where it won the Best Short Documentary Award.

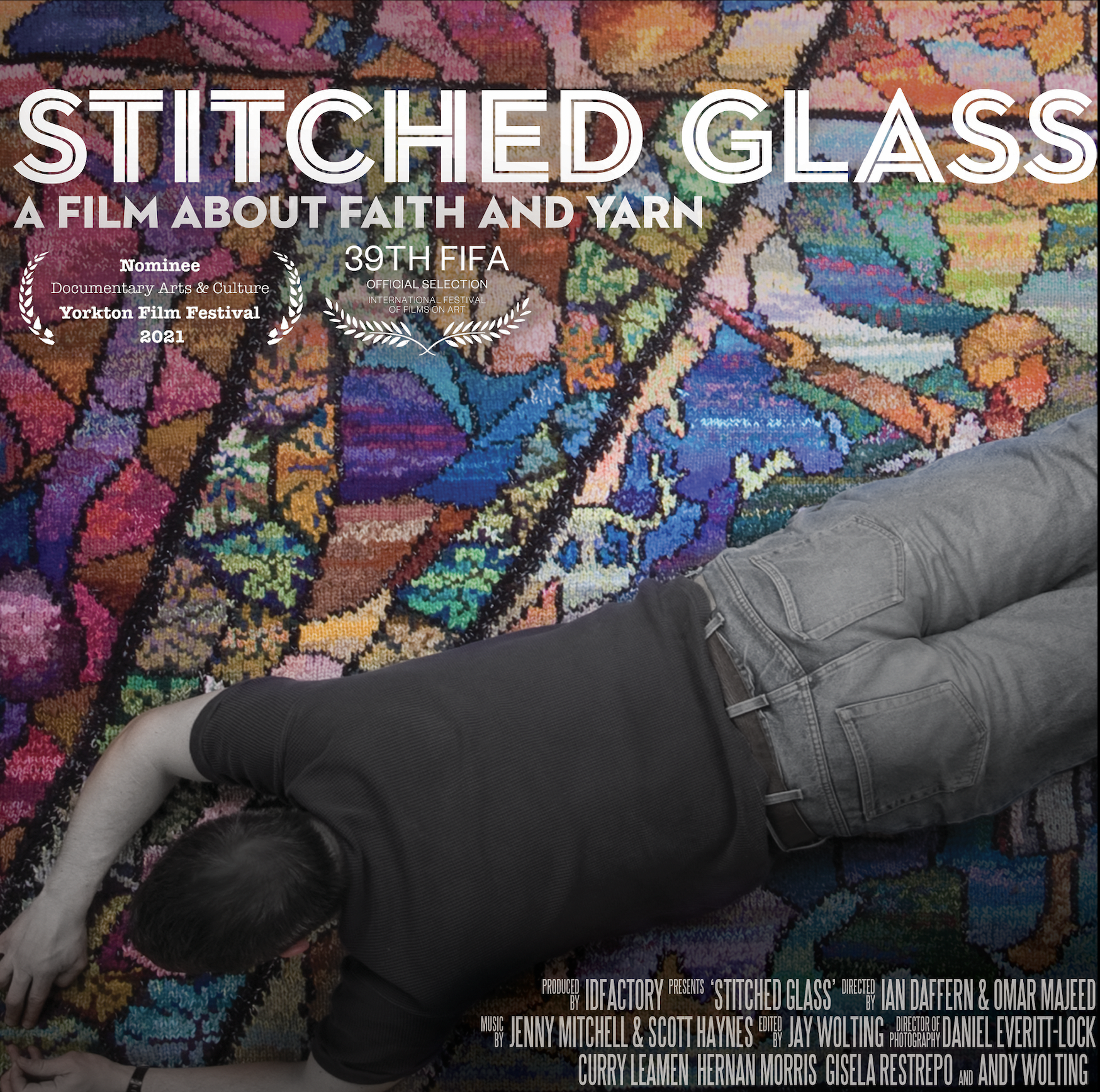
Stitched Glass: A Film About Faith and Yarn

Filmmaker Todd Witham made Threads of Abraham, another documentary film about Dunn and his "Stitched Glass" project. An abridged version of this film on YouTube provides lecture footage and insights into the process and themes prevalent in Dunn's work.

=== The Knitting Pilgrim ===
Dunn developed a one-man show chronicling his journey creating the "Stitched Glass" tapestries, called The Knitting Pilgrim. Co-written with his wife, Claire Ross Dunn, and with dramaturgy by Beverley Cooper, the play was directed by Jennifer Tarver, and produced by Ergo Arts Theatre in Toronto, Ontario. Supported in part by the Toronto Arts Council and the Canada Council, The Knitting Pilgrim premiered at the Aga Khan Museum in Toronto in May 2019. In conjunction with the play's run, and taking inspiration from the Museum's permanent collection, Dunn also offered a four-hour knitted pillow workshop.

The Knitting Pilgrim uses the "Stitched Glass" panels as a backdrop and setting to performatively recount his artistic and spiritual journey hand-knitting the giant tapestries. The show combines personal storytelling, image projection, and the three knitted panels. Dunn's intention with The Knitting Pilgrimis to spark conversations about xenophobia, anti-Semitism, and Islamophobia, and the realization that people can have a lot in common despite different faiths. To aid in this pedagogical process, Dunn follows all performances of the play with a talkback session with the audience.

Following its premiere, The Knitting Pilgrim went on an Ontario tour, playing in cities Barrie, Burlington, Collingwood, Orillia, North Bay, Stratford, and Waterloo. In Ottawa, Dunn opened to rave reviews from apt613 critic, Colin Noden, and Eric Coates, also writing for apt613, named the play a top pick of the 2019 Ottawa Fringe Festival. At the Toronto Fringe Festival, Lynn Slotkin of The Slotkin Letter endorsed the work with a complimentary review, and she later awarded the play a 2019 Tootsie Award (similar to a Top Ten Award). In her "Fringe My Way" review, Aurora Browne picked The Knitting Pilgrim as one of "Aurora's List" fringe picks, and it was listed as one of the 'Top Ten Shows to See' by Toronto's NOW Magazine. In Hamilton, the play was given six out of five stars by CFMU's theatre critic, Olivia Fava, who found the show personally "transformative," noting she "had never seen anything like this before".

== Personal life ==
Dunn is married to Canadian writer Claire Ross Dunn. The younger of their two children, Emmett Ross Dunn, plays soccer for Chichester City Football Club.

He has two brothers; the younger, Marc Dunn, is a University of Toronto Hall of Famer for men's volleyball, who played Beach Volleyball for Team Canada at the 1996 Olympics in Atlanta.
