= Flash Forward =

1990s Canadian television series

- Genre: Adventure; Sitcom
- Created by: Bernice Vanderlaan; Alyson Feltes; Daphne Ballon
- Written by: Robert L. Baird; Thérèse Beaupré; Robert C. Cooper; Sarah Dodd; Sheri Elwood; Dennis Foon; John May; Anita Kapila; Allan Novak; Dawn Ritchie; John Slama; Bernice Vanderlaan; Ian Weir; Howard Wiseman
- Directed by: Alex Chapple; John Bell; Milan Cheylov; Neill Fearnley; Graeme Lynch; Bruce McDonald; Ron Oliver; David Straiton; Stephen Williams
- Creative director: John May
- Starring: Ben Foster; Jewel Staite; Asia Vieira; Theodore Borders
- Countries of origin: Canada; United States
- Original language: English
- No. of seasons: 1
- No. of episodes: 26

Production
- Executive producers: Daphne Ballon; Seaton McLean; Alyson Feltes (Episodes 1–4)
- Producers: Jamie Paul Rock (Episodes 1–4); Jan Peter Meyboom (Episodes 5–26)
- Production locations: Hamilton, Ontario, Canada; Toronto, Ontario, Canada
- Cinematography: David Perrault
- Running time: 22 minutes
- Production companies: Atlantis Communications; Walt Disney Television

Original release
- Network: Disney Channel (preview: 1995–96; main-run: 1997-1999); ABC (preview-run: 1996)
- Release: December 14, 1995 – 1997

Flash Forward is a Disney Channel Original Series produced in Canada for preteens and teenagers which was originally previewed on both Disney Channel and ABC from 1995 to 1996 with its main run starting from 1997 to 1999. The series first aired as a 4-episode limited-run preview on The Disney Channel from December 14, 1995 to January 6, 1996. Starting on September 14, 1996, the series aired as a special nationwide preview-run on ABC's Saturday morning lineup. and remained on the network's schedule until December 1996. On January 1, 1997, the series premiered on The Disney Channel with a special New Year's Day 5-hour, 10-episode marathon, and on January 5, the series moved to its regular time slot on Saturdays and Sundays.

The show focuses on the lives of two best friends and neighbors since birth, Tucker and Rebecca, and their respective adventures as they travel through the world of eighth grade with their other best friends, Christine and Miles. The show was produced by Atlantis Films in association with Disney Channel, Walt Disney Television, and distributed by Buena Vista Television. Flash Forward was the first series branded under the "Disney Channel Original Series" label.

== Characters ==
=== Tuck James ===
Tucker "Tuck" James (Ben Foster) is a 13-year-old boy who has just started eighth grade and sees it as a life-altering event. Tucker faces the travails of a teen's life with his trademark humor and rebounds from the fouls dealt by bullies and the occasional intruding parent by seeking solace in his friendship with Miles. He and Becca have been best friends since they were born and remain committed to each other through thick and thin.

- Tucker (age 5) is played by Marc Donato.

=== Becca Fisher ===
Rebecca "Becca" Fisher (Jewel Staite), also 13, is the much-flustered best friend of Tucker and is experiencing the same disillusionment with eighth grade. Her new best friend is Christine, someone who Becca sees as an easier person than Tucker to confide in about the things that are starting to matter (namely boys). Becca also faces ridicule from her bossy and stuck-up sister Ellen and carries a secret crush on the local pizza maker, Gooch.

- Becca (age 5) is played by Jennifer Pisana.

=== Miles Vaughn ===
Miles (Theodore Borders) is Tucker's new best friend and starts the eighth grade year off as his constant companion. He often acts as the voice of reason in his relationship with Tucker, often bringing Tucker back down to the ground when he allows his flights of fancy to get the better of him.

=== Chris Harrison ===
Christine "Chris" Harrison (Asia Vieira) is Becca's new best friend and often finds herself in the middle of Becca's schemes and troubles. She serves as a source of companionship and most importantly a listener, someone Becca can confide in during their ever-changing world. Christine is the owner of the dubiously named Steve, a dog.

=== Horace James ===
Horace (Ricky Mabe) is Tucker's long-suffering younger brother. He is often the butt of Tucker's jokes and pranks, but holds a great deal of respect for his older brother. He is known for capturing all on his video camera, sometimes using the footage to his advantage as blackmail against Tucker.

=== Ellen Fisher ===
Played by both Rachel Blanchard (ep. 1–4) and Robin Brûlé, Ellen is Becca's domineering, self-centered older sister. She has no real respect for anyone other than herself and (arguably) her boyfriend Ryan. Ellen is often a source of pain and discomfort for her younger sister.

== Episodes ==
No.	Title	Directed by	Written by	Original release date
1	"Fresh Start all Over Again"	Graeme Lynch	Heather Conkle	December 14, 1995
It's the first day of school and there are let downs (and drop downs - of Tucker's clothing).
2	"I'm OK, You're a Jerk"	Graeme Lynch	Kevin Neville	December 21, 1995
Becca petitions for Christine to be allowed to wrestle, while Tucker mocks the idea of girls wrestling, and a wrestling contest between Christine and his rival, Jack.
3	"House Party"	Graeme Lynch	Susin Nielsen	TBA
While the parents are away, Becca and Tucker decide to throw a party at his house, while Becca's older sister Ellen throws one at Becca's house. It soon becomes clear that Tucker's main objective is to impress Kerry while Becca wants to impress Ellen's friend Zack, and results in neither of them being interested in just hanging out with friends at a party.
4	"Cool Book"	Graeme Lynch	Dawn Ritchie	TBA
Kerry's idea to start a Cool Book (Slam Book) results in hurtful comments being passed around.
5	"On Your Toes"	Neill Fearnley	Jackie May	TBA
Becca must choose between the perks associated with being in pep squad and her love of ballet, while Tucker and Miles try to win a candid photo contest.
6	"Speechless"	Graeme Lynch	Sheri Elwood & John May	TBA
Becca is determined to beat her rival Vega (Raine Pare-Coull) in a speech contest, and Tucker writes a proposal to try to take over reading the announcements from his rival, Jack.
7	"Scalpers"	Graeme Lynch	Story by : Dennis Foon; Teleplay by : Dennis Foon & John May	TBA
After Kerry manipulates Tucker into giving her a concert ticket intended for Becca, Tucker tries to find a way to obtain and pay for another ticket, which involves him manipulating a few people himself.
8	"Dog Day After Lunch"	Milan Cheylov	Kate Barris	TBA
Tucker's attempt to help his little brother Horace deal with a bully results in a scheduled fight between them and their respective nemeses, while Becca and Christine take an interest in a dog on the school compound.
9	"Makeover"	Bruce McDonald	M. Fred Wright & Steve Wright	TBA
Becca's old best friend Max returns from New York and clashes with new best friend Christine, while Tucker comes up with a scheme to spend quality time with Kerry.
10	"That's My Baby"	Ron Oliver	Story by : Thèrése Beaupré; Teleplay by : Anita Kapila & John Slama	TBA
Tucker volunteers to look after the fake baby he and Becca are assigned so that Becca will babysit Horace in return, while Christine prepares to get Steve neutered. Amanda Tapping guest stars as Ms. Yansouni.
11	"Double Bill"	John Bell	Heather Conkle	TBA
Hoping to experience her first kiss, Becca plans a double date with Christine, Scott Stuckey (Ryan Gosling) and Zed (Kris Lemche) while Tucker drags Miles and Steve along to spy on them.
12	"Maltese Chicken"	John Bell	Sheri Elwood	January 26, 1997 (Disney Channel)
Becca and Ellen both want to go to Malta, but there is only one ticket, so Becca enlists the help of Tucker and Miles, first in spying on Ellen to prove that she doesn't deserve to go, and then in locating the desired ticket after Becca loses it.
13	"Flossed in the Woods"	Ron Oliver	Bernice Vanderlaan	February 2, 1997 (Disney Channel)
Becca, Tucker, Christine, Miles, Horace and Steve go camping in the woods and find it a lot harder than they expected.
14	"Crime and Punishment"	Milan Cheylov	Ian Weir	TBA
Tucker drags Miles into his scheme of becoming a living legend by planning a complicated prank while Becca needs to write a great article to convince the editor of the school paper to give her a better job.
15	"Good Sports"	John Bell	John Slama	TBA
Tucker tries out for the soccer team in order to appear in a team picture in the yearbook other than the AV Team, and discovers that he is actually a good goalie, while Becca has to cover the sports section of the paper in order to be allowed to have a poetry feature.
16	"Love Letters"	Stephen Williams	Story by : Thèrése Beaupré; Teleplay by : John Slama	TBA
Concerned that Miles is spending too much time with his computer, Becca and Tucker send him an online love letter anonymously but don't let Christine in on the plan since they think that she can't keep a secret. Complications arise when Miles wants to meet his secret admirer and Christine becomes upset that Becca and Tucker are hiding something from her.
17	"Presents"	Ron Oliver	Robert C. Cooper	TBA
Tucker and Becca share a birthday and have a tradition of exchanging gifts the night before. Tucker is determined to get Becca a great gift for once while Becca is preoccupied with the birthday treat her crush Gooch offered her for the same day.
18	"Apeward Bound"	David Straiton	John Slama	TBA
Miles has a plan for enabling him and Christine to sneak away to see a movie festival during a school trip, while Becca and Tucker become lost on the trip.
19	"Mudpack"	Ron Oliver	Sheri Elwood & Rob Baird	TBA
Becca, on Max's advice, wants to crash the ninth grade secret mudslide party to change her reputation from being too serious, and gets help to do so from Tucker, who is being severely punished for crashing a car into the garage and has vowed to change his reputation to being more "helpful".
20	"Just Friends"	Graeme Lynch	Susin Nielsen	TBA
Max tells Becca that people think that she and Tucker are a couple, so Becca tries to distance herself from him by forcing him to spend time with Christine instead (coaching Horace in baseball), the result of which surprises and upsets her.
21	"Skate Bait"	Anita Kapila	Alex Chapple	TBA
Gooch volunteers to represent Tucker and Miles in a skating contest against Scott Stuckey (Ryan Gosling), but he gets injured, leaving Tucker to replace him, so Becca, informing Tucker, agrees to defeat Scott in the contest.
22	"Expose"	Neill Fearnley	Ian Weir	TBA
When a journalist comes to Parkview to do a story on the students, Becca uses the opportunity to try to get a column in the newspaper that he works for, while Tucker, Miles and their friends conspire to make the students seem more interesting.
23	"Saboteur"	Alex Chapple	John May & John Slama	TBA
After Miles and Tucker belittle the idea that Becca can help them sabotage the school float, she gets Christine and new girl Darby (Caterina Scorsone) to help her devise a separate sabotage plan and fails to notice that Tucker has a crush on Darby, which makes it difficult for him to concentrate on his own plan.
24	"Funny Like Me"	Ron Oliver	Story by : Anita Kapila & Allan Novak and Howie Wisman; Teleplay by : Anita Kapila	TBA
For a school talent show, Max and Christine agree to do a tap dancing act with Becca, but find that she is the weakest link in their act; Miles gets stuck with Abbie (Maia Filar) for a partner, first in a magic and then in a music act; and Tucker plans a comedy act with Roland (Matt Lemche), who then begins to emulate him.
25	"Fright Night"	Neill Fearnley	Sheri Elwood	TBA
Becca promises Tucker a fun night with her and Max while her parents and Ellen are out, and Miles and Christine plan to have a horror festival while Tucker's parents are out.
26	"Curtain Call"	Graeme Lynch	Story by : Sarah Dodd & Ian Weir; Teleplay by : John Slama	TBA
Becca adapts Robin Hood for a play for the school. Soon however, she and Tucker are cast as Robin Hood and Maid Marian. Despite a disagreement between the two of them, Miles and Christine are able to get Tucker and Becca to reconcile and get the play back on track. The series ends with Tucker and Becca sharing a kiss.
