= Asia Vieira =

Canadian actress

- Born: Asia Molly Vieira; May 18, 1982 (age 44); Toronto, Ontario, Canada
- Occupation: Actress
- Years active: 1988–2015

Asia Molly Vieira (born May 18, 1982) is a Canadian actress best known for her early role in the 1991 made-for-television Omen IV: The Awakening and playing as Christine Harrison in the Disney Channel original series, Flash Forward.

== Early life and education ==
Born in Toronto, Ontario, Canada, she began her career as a child model at the age of four, later gaining her first major role in 1988 alongside Diane Keaton and Liam Neeson in The Good Mother. She is an accomplished gymnast and graduated from the Etobicoke School of the Arts as a music theatre major. She was also a student at the University of Toronto, studying both drama and history.

== Career ==
Vieira has starred in numerous made-for-TV movies and popular television shows, but she is probably best known for playing the roles of Jewel Staite's best friend Christine Harrison in the TV series Flash Forward, Sally in The Adventures of Dudley the Dragon and Delia York, daughter of Damien Thorn, in Omen IV: The Awakening. She has recently been recording for both radio and cartoons, along with appearing in a number of made-for-TV movies and short films including I Am an Apartment Building which won Best Canadian short at the Edmonton Short Film Festival.

== Filmography ==
=== Film ===
Year	Title	Role	Notes
1988	The Good Mother	Molly Dunlop	
1992	Used People	Young Norma Schulman	
2004	A Home at the End of the World	Emily	
2015	My Ex-Ex	Tracy	

=== Television ===
Year	Title	Role	Notes
1990	The Kissing Place	Melissa	Television film
1990–1993	Street Legal	Kim Davis	24 episodes
1991	E.N.G.	Maria Visconti	Episode: "In the Blood"
1991	Omen IV: The Awakening	Delia York	Television film
1994–1997	The Adventures of Dudley the Dragon	Sally	33 episodes
1995	A Holiday to Remember	Jordy Giblin	Television film
1995–1996	The Magic School Bus	Caller (voice)	3 episodes
1996	Wind at My Back	Skipper	Episode: "No Way of Telling"
1996–1997	Flash Forward	Christine "Chris" Harrison	26 episodes
1998	Goosebumps	Sue	Episode: "Teacher's Pet"
1999	Are You Afraid of the Dark?	Meggie Evans	Episode: "The Tale of the Secret Admirer"
1999	Tales from the Cryptkeeper	Erin (voice)	Episode: "Town Gathering"
2000	Twice in a Lifetime	Angel Ryder (14 years)	Episode: "The Sins of Our Fathers"
2001	Dangerous Child	Kayla	Television film
2002	Guilt by Association	Teenage Hannah	Television film
2006	Gospel of Deceit	Margaret	Television film
2006	I Am an Apartment Building	Teenager	Television short
2009	The Dating Guy	Sue (voice)	Episode: "Bonnie & Mark"
