= Martin Julen =

Swiss alpine skier (born 1928)

Personal information
- Nationality: Swiss
- Born: 31 March 1928 Zermatt, Switzerland

Sport
- Sport: Alpine skiing

Martin Julen (born 31 March 1928) is a Swiss alpine skier. He competed in two events at the 1956 Winter Olympics.
